= List of cities, towns and villages in Kerman province =

A list of cities, towns and villages in Kerman Province of Iran:

== Alphabetically ==
Cities are in bold text; all others are villages.

=== A ===
Ab Anjir | Ab Bad | Ab Bad-e Kaleb Ali Khani | Ab Bad-e Pedari | Ab Bad-e Qahremani | Ab Bad-e Sivandi | Ab Bahri | Ab Barik | Ab Bordeh | Ab Bordeh | Ab Damil | Ab Garm | Ab Garm | Ab Garm | Ab Garm-e Yek | Ab Garuiyeh | Ab Gel | Ab Ghamushiyeh | Ab Khizuiyeh | Ab Korik | Ab Kuch | Ab Mis | Ab Nai | Ab Panguiyeh | Ab Rokhan | Ab Sarduiyeh | Ab Sarduiyeh | Ab Shur | Ab Taruiyeh | Abadan-e Hoseyni | Abad-e Chehel Tan | Abadi Chaleh | Abadi Kheyrabad | Abareq | Abbadbibi | Abbasabad Molla Reza | Abbasabad | Abbasabad | Abbasabad | Abbasabad | Abbasabad | Abbasabad | Abbasabad | Abbasabad | Abbasabad | Abbasabad | Abbasabad | Abbasabad | Abbasabad | Abbasabad | Abbasabad | Abbasabad | Abbasabad-e Amin | Abbasabad-e Bahrami | Abbasabad-e Esfak | Abbasabad-e Fallah | Abbasabad-e Ghafur | Abbasabad-e Hajji | Abbasabad-e Moin | Abbasabad-e Pamzar | Abbasabad-e Pisht | Abbasabad-e Sardar | Abbasabad-e Sargorich | Abbasiyeh | Abdar Miyan | Abdar | Abdolabad | Abdolabad | Abdolabad | Abdolabad | Abdolabad | Abdolabad | Abdolabad | Abdollahabad | Abdollahabad | Abdollahabad | Abdollahabad | Abdollahabad | Abdollahabad-e Do | Abdollahabad-e Yek | Abdun-e Anjir | Ab-e Garm | Ab-e Garmu | Ab-e Garmu-ye Yek | Ab-e Hayat | Abegarm | Abgarm | Abgarm | Abgarm | Abgarm | Abgarm | Abgarm | Abidu | Abkar Ashayir Garuh-ye 25 | Abkhurak | Abnama | Absegun | Abuzariyeh | Abuzariyeh | Adim ol Mesal | Aduri | Aduri | Aduri | Aduri | Afghan Refugee Camp | Afraz | Afzar | Aghancheh | Aghel Nazri | Aghin | Ahangaran | Ahmad Khani | Ahmadabad | Ahmadabad | Ahmadabad | Ahmadabad | Ahmadabad | Ahmadabad-e Abbaskhan | Ahmadabad-e Atayi | Ahmadabad-e Difeh Khoshk | Ahmadabad-e Do | Ahmadabad-e Do | Ahmadabad-e Esfandiyari | Ahmadabad-e Fallah | Ahmadabad-e Harandi | Ahmadabad-e Posht Kan | Ahmadabad-e Razavi | Ahmadabad-e Sahlavar | Ahmadabad-e Yalamqani | Ahmadi | Ahmadi | Ahmadiyeh | Ahmadiyeh | Ahran Dar | Ahruiyeh | Ahugan | Ahuiyeh | Akbarabad | Akbarabad | Akbarabad | Akbarabad | Akbarabad | Akbarabad | Akbarabad | Akbarabad | Akbarabad | Akbarabad | Akbarabad-e Arjomand | Akbarabad-e Bahari | Akbarabad-e Barkhvordar | Akbarabad-e Hejri | Akbarabad-e Mostowfi | Akbarabad-e Now Kan | Akbarabad-e Rah Niz | Akbarabad-e Vaziri | Akbarabad-e Yek | Akhorak | Akramabad-e Chahgavari | Ala ol Din-e Olya | Ala ol Din-e Sofla | Alamabad | Ali Bandu-ye Olya | Ali Koli | Ali Zohuran | Aliabad | Aliabad | Aliabad | Aliabad | Aliabad | Aliabad | Aliabad | Aliabad | Aliabad | Aliabad | Aliabad | Aliabad | Aliabad | Aliabad | Aliabad | Aliabad | Aliabad | Aliabad | Aliabad | Aliabad | Aliabad-e Chahdegan | Aliabad-e Darreh Dur | Aliabad-e Do | Aliabad-e Enqelab | Aliabad-e Hasan | Aliabad-e Herati | Aliabad-e Hojjat | Aliabad-e Jahr | Aliabad-e Kafi | Aliabad-e Khazayi-ye Aliabad-e Marki | Aliabad-e Kuh Namaki | Aliabad-e Moftabad | Aliabad-e Mohammad Qasem Khan | Aliabad-e Olya | Aliabad-e Posht-e Rig | Aliabad-e Qadiri | Aliabad-e Robat | Aliabad-e Rugushuiyeh | Aliabad-e Sadat | Aliabad-e Sadat | Aliabad-e Shahid | Aliabad-e Shamshir Bar | Aliabad-e Sofla | Aliabad-e Sofla | Aliabad-e Tadayyon | Aliabad-e Takht-e Khvajeh | Aliabad-e Vali Shahanvazi | Aliabad-e Vaziri | Aliabad-e Yek | Aliabad-e Yek | Aliabad-e Yek | Aliabad-e Ziaabad | Aliabad-e Zinbiyeh | Alishahi | Allahabad | Allahabad | Allahabad | Allahabad-e Abu Saidi | Allahabad-e Chah Rigan | Allahabad-e Dehqani | Allahabad-e Do | Allahabad-e Hajjiabad | Allahabad-e Jahangir Khan | Allahabad-e Mostowfi | Allahabad-e Olya | Allahabad-e Rezvan | Allahabad-e Seyyed | Allahabad-e Sofla | Allahabad-e Tabatbayi | Allahabad-e Yek | Amar | Amar | Amar | Amarduiyeh | Ameriyeh | Ameriyeh-ye Bala | Aminabad | Aminabad | Aminshahr | Amirabad | Amirabad | Amirabad | Amirabad | Amirabad | Amirabad | Amirabad | Amirabad | Amirabad | Amirabad-e Amirqoli | Amirabad-e Bala | Amirabad-e Kot Gorg | Amirabad-e Nazarian | Amirabad-e Pain | Amirabad-e Shul | Amirabad-e Sukhek | Amirabad-e Yek | Amiriyeh | Amiriyeh | Amjadiyeh-ye Pain | Amjaz | Amrabad | Amrduiyeh | Anar | Anarak | Anarak-e Bala | Anarak-e Pain | Anarestan | Anaru-ye Yaieh | Anbarabad | Anbarutak | Andardari | Andera-ye Olya | Anduhjerd | Angar-e Chaleh | Anjerak | Anjir Bazuiyeh | Anjir Siah-e Olya | Anjir Sikan-e Bala | Anjirak | Anjirak | Anjirestan | Antarak | Arababad | Arababad | Arazi Ashayir Kurki | Arazi-ye Qaleh Now | Ardiz-e Olya | Aren-e Sofla | Arghavan | Argin | Arizabad | Arjas | Arjomandiyeh | Arkan | Armalok | Arzuiyeh | Asadabad | Asadabad | Asadabad-e Anguri | Asadabad-e Rahnama | Asadiyeh-e Pain | Aseminun | Ashak Rezvan | Ashayir-e Afrashteh | Ashin-e Olya | Ashin-e Sofla | Ashkam Kuh | Ashkutu | Ashrafabad | Ashubeh | Asiyab-e Alikhan | Asiyab-e Mir Naser | Asput | Astaneh | Astaneh | Ateshan | Ateshun-e Namju | Ateshun-e Olya | Avazabad | Avres Morad | Azadegan-e Yek | Azerenjan | Azizabad | Azizabad | Azizabad-e Sheybani |

=== B ===
Bab Abdan | Bab Ayisi | Bab Biduiyeh | Bab Bini | Bab Deraz | Bab Duri | Bab Galuiyeh | Bab Gask | Bab Gorg | Bab Gorgi | Bab Goruiyeh | Bab Hayyeh | Bab Hutak | Bab Karafs | Bab Khowshab | Bab Kiki | Bab Maran | Bab Mishan-e Bala | Bab Nadan | Bab Nem | Bab Shegaft | Bab Sukhtegan | Bab Tangal | Bab Torsh | Bab Zangi | Bab Zeytun | Baba Hajji | Bab-e Kahnuj | Bab-e Kahnuj | Bab-e Shamil | Babidan | Babnizu | Badam | Badamak | Badam-e Dan | Badamestan-e Bala | Badamuiyeh | Badamuiyeh | Badiz | Badrabad | Badrabad | Badrabad-e Chahgavari | Baduiyeh-ye Olya | Badumiyeh | Baft | Bagh Ahani | Bagh Ahmad | Bagh Ali Shir | Bagh Bennah | Bagh Bid | Bagh Bid-e Olya | Bagh Bid-e Sofla | Bagh Borj | Bagh Chamak | Bagh Deh | Bagh Kharab | Bagh Kuchek | Bagh Pishgah | Bagh Sukhteh | Bagh Tak | Baghabar | Baghak | Baghan | Baghat | Bagh-e Alishir | Bagh-e Babuiyeh | Bagh-e Bala | Bagh-e Bazm | Bagh-e Ebrahim | Bagh-e Esfahanuiyeh | Bagh-e Fakhruiyeh | Bagh-e Gol | Bagh-e Hajji | Bagh-e Hutk | Bagh-e Khoshk | Bagh-e Malek | Bagh-e Molla | Bagh-e Pashmarki | Bagh-e Pirevali | Bagh-e Yas | Bagh-e Zardalu | Baghijan | Baghin | Baghin | Baghuiyeh | Baghuiyeh | Baghuiyeh-ye Do | Baghuyeh | Bahaabad | Bahar Kahur | Baharestan | Baharestan | Bahmanabad | Bahram Jerd | Bahramabad | Bahramabad | Bahrami-ye Olya | Bahrami-ye Sofla | Bahramjerd | Bahreman | Bahrin | Bajgan | Bala Rudkhaneh | Baluchabad | Baluchabad-e Sargorich | Balvard | Bam | Bambuyan | Ban Ab | Banak | Banavand | Bandar Pirshahi | Bandar-e Shah Rokhi | Bandar-e Turk | Band-e Mahmud | Band-e Nadarkesh | Band-e Saraji | Bandevan | Bandgorgi | Bani Taratom | Baqerabad | Baqerabad | Baqerabad | Baqerabad | Baqerabad-e Do | Baqerabad-e Rig | Baqerabad-e Tabatabayi | Baqeriyeh-ye Bala | Bar Avard Shodeh | Bar Sorkh | Baravat | Bard-e Stu | Bardeh | Bardial | Bardsir | Barf Anbar | Barfeh | Barfgin | Barfuiyeh | Bargah | Bariku | Barim | Barjak | Barmeshk | Barreh Kolang | Barsuz | Basferjan | Bash Abdan | Bashak | Bashruiyeh | Bayaz | Bayaz-e Bala | Bazgir | Behbud | Beheshtabad | Beheshti | Behjatabad | Behjerd-e Bala | Behjerd-e Sofla | Behkin-e Pain | Behnua-ye Bala | Behnuiyeh | Behruziyeh | Behtarabad | Ben Abdan | Benehzari | Berich | Bersun | Bezang-e Hajjiabad | Bezenjan | Bezenkuiyeh | Bi Zanuiyeh | Bibi Hayat | Bid Andar | Bid Duri | Bid Kheyri | Bid Khvab | Bid Korduiyeh | Bid Mehr | Bid Zagh | Bidan | Bidan | Bidan-e Khvajeh | Bidaran-e Kohneh | Bidaran-e Now | Bid-e Estakhr | Bid-e Shirin | Bid-e Shirin-e Do | Bideshak | Bideshk | Bideshk | Bidestan | Bidkhun-e Morghak | Bidsukhteh | Biduiyeh | Biduiyeh-ye Nakhai | Biduiyeh-ye Yek | Bigaman | Birabad | Bizhanabad-e Olya | Bizhanabad-e Sofla | Bog-e Sagilan | Bokhtin | Bolbolabad | Bolbolu-ye Kalantar | Boluk | Bon Chah | Bon Gowd | Bon Kan | Bon Kuh-e Olya | Bon Kuh-e Sofla | Bon La | Bon Sefid | Bon Tut | Bon Zard | Bondar Ziaratgah | Bondar | Bondar-e Gavsin | Bondar-e Geshkin | Bond-e Bari | Bond-e Bari | Bon-e Derriz | Bon-e Esfandi | Bon-e Gelu | Bon-e Hur | Bon-e Navizan | Boneh Guni | Boneh Posht | Boneh Sukhteh | Boneh-ye Ba Damuiyeh | Boneh-ye Bad | Boneh-ye Chahar | Boneh-ye Narges | Boneh-ye Rezvan | Boneh-ye Sib | Boneh-ye Sukhteh Char | Boneh-ye Zangar | Bonestan | Bongajg | Bongan | Bongan | Bongarun | Bonkal | Bonkaram | Bonkuiyeh | Bonuiyeh | Boqkerteh | Boriduiyeh | Borjabad | Borjak-e Hasan | Borjak-e Seyfollah | Borj-e Abbasabad | Borj-e Akram | Borj-e Moaz | Borkenan-e Olya | Borkenan-e Sofla | Borunabad | Borzang | Borz-e Rafiabad | Bostan | Bowj | Buheng | Bujan | Buseh Hajj | Bustan | Bustan

=== C ===
Chah Abdol-e Fariyab | Chah Aduri | Chah Amuzi | Chah Badam | Chah Bagh Hasan | Chah Bahram | Chah Bereshk | Chah Beygi | Chah Cheragh | Chah Dasht-e Buheng | Chah Gabar | Chah Galleh | Chah Gaz | Chah Gazamani | Chah Ghazelbash | Chah Haftad Tumani-ye Do | Chah Hajji | Chah Kafteh | Chah Kahnuiyeh | Chah Khargushi | Chah Khashtu | Chah Lak | Chah Mazra | Chah Mish | Chah Mord | Chah Morid | Chah Nar | Chah Nareh Cha Abbasi | Chah Narenj | Chah Nayi-ye Hazeri | Chah Nazari | Chah ol Madin | Chah Palasi | Chah Pat | Chah Piruzi | Chah Qaleh | Chah Qanbar | Chah Qoli Di-ye Yek | Chah Quski | Chah Saida | Chah Sangari | Chah Suri | Chah Yusefali | Chah Zangi | Chah Ziarat Daniyal | Chahak | Chahak | Chahak | Chahak | Chahaki | Chahan | Chahar Chahi | Chahar Gav Bandi | Chahar Kahn | Chahar Kesht | Chahar Taq | Chahartai | Chahartaq | Chahdokon | Chahkin | Chahnarenj | Chahuiyeh | Chakeri | Chaleh | Chaleh | Chamak | Chaman | Chamanrang | Chan Taki | Chari | Charmil | Charrah | Chatrud | Chavarchi | Cheh Gol Shirkhan | Chehel Mani | Chehel Mani | Chehel Tokhm | Chehel Tokhm | Chek Chek | Chelitan | Chelu | Chenalu | Chenar Turan | Chenar | Chenaran | Chenaran-e Do | Chenaran-e Yek | Chenarbarin | Chenar-e Kaf | Chenar-e Pidenguiyeh | Chenaru | Chenaruiyeh | Chenaruiyeh | Chenaruiyeh | Cheragh Rigi Nezhad | Cheraghabad | Cheraghabad | Cheraghu | Cheshmeh Gaz | Cheshmeh Sabz | Cheshmeh Sabz-e Pain | Cheshmeh Sabz-e Sofla | Cheshmehha | Cheshmeh-ye Rigi | Cheshmeh-ye Seyfollahi | Chil Dahanu | Chil Konar | Chilabad | Chineh Hukerd | Choghar Chuiyeh | Choghukabad | Choghuki-ye Olya | Choghutuiyeh | Chu Chun |

=== D ===
Dadalhi | Daemak | Dahanabad | Dahandar Mig | Dahandar | Dahan-e Daran | Dahaneh Bid | Dahaneh Morghak | Dahaneh Sar Asiyab | Dahaneh Tangal | Dahaneh-e Zurak | Dahaneh-ye Ab Dar | Dahaneh-ye Abbasali | Dahaneh-ye Abshuiyeh | Dahaneh-ye Bagh | Dahaneh-ye Gomrokan | Dahaneh-ye Khargan | Daharan | Daharan-e Zaminband | Dahuiyeh | Dahuiyeh | Daj | Dak | Dakhtak | Dalabad | Damaneh | Dam-e Bahayi | Damir | Dandoski | Dang-e Nim | Daquqabad | Dar Ab | Dar Abzar | Dar Bagh | Dar Bagh | Dar Chenar | Dar Cheshmeh | Dar Eshkut | Dar Gerdu | Dar Kam | Dar Kham | Dar Khuni | Dar Mazar | Dar Pahn | Dar Sarvaran | Dar Shur Ab-e Pain | Dar Zanguiyeh | Darab | Darababad | Daram Rud | Darb Ziarat | Darbar | Darbast-e Yek | Darb-e Anarestan | Darb-e Asiab | Darb-e Babazi | Darb-e Behesht | Darb-e Hamzeh | Darb-e Hezar | Darb-e Kahat | Darb-e Ziarat-e Cheshmeh | Darbidan | Darbidan | Darbiduiyeh | Dard-e Richeh | Dar-e Bid Khun | Dar-e Boneh | Dar-e Dask | Dar-e Kalat | Dar-e Nadun | Dar-e Patak | Darenjan | Dareshk | Darestan | Darestan | Dargar-e Babgohar | Dargi | Dargira | Darhamzeh | Darin | Darin | Darinuiyeh | Darkaz Baluk | Darkhiz | Darm Shuki | Darmurti | Darniyan | Darpa | Darras | Darreh Dur | Darreh Garma | Darreh Kerdi | Darreh Murti | Darreh Nikuiyeh | Darreh Ranj | Darreh Rud | Darreh Shur | Darreh Tang | Darrehi | Darreh-ye Hud | Darreh-ye Jowz | Darreh-ye Kalatehi | Darshanemu | Darsinuyeh | Darudmand | Daruiyeh | Darujin | Darundeh | Darva | Darvish Soltani | Daryacheh | Daryanil | Daryiduiyeh | Darzarun | Darzeh | Darzin-e Do | Darzin-e Yek | Dasabad | Dashtabad | Dashtabad | Dasht-e Bezanjun | Dasht-e Deh | Dasht-e Ganjabad Ashayir Alidadi | Dasht-e Khak | Dasht-e Kuch-e Bala | Dasht-e Kuch-e Pain | Dasht-e Mehran | Dasht-e Shaqin | Dasht-e Zahmatkeshan | Dasht-e Zar | Dashtkar | Dashtruan | Dashtuiyeh | Dashtuiyeh | Dast-e Gechan | Dastjerd | Dastjerd | Dastjerd | Dastjerd-e Sofla | Dastuiyeh | Davaran | Davaran | Davarunuiyeh | Davazdah Emam | Daz | Dazan | Dazuk | Dazulin | Degas | Deh Abuzar | Deh Ali | Deh Bakri | Deh Bala | Deh Ban-e Sofla | Deh Chenar | Deh Chil | Deh Darzeh | Deh Divan | Deh Divan | Deh Gabr | Deh Gazi | Deh Golabi | Deh Gowd | Deh Gusheh | Deh Heydar | Deh Kaberi | Deh Kahan | Deh Khan | Deh Khinu | Deh Khvajeh | Deh Lachin | Deh Mahmud | Deh Malek | Deh Mansur | Deh Mian | Deh Nay | Deh Nazer | Deh Nazri | Deh Nevoiyeh | Deh Now | Deh Now | Deh Now | Deh Now | Deh Now | Deh Now-e Allah Verdi | Deh Now-e Azizabad | Deh Now-e Behzadi | Deh Now-e Derakhti | Deh Now-e Do | Deh Now-e Esahaqabad | Deh Now-e Farrokhzad | Deh Now-e Jahangir Khan | Deh Now-e Kheyari | Deh Now-e Mirza Zadeh Sejadi | Deh Now-e Nowdezh | Deh Now-e Qalandar | Deh Now-e Qaleh Olya | Deh Now-e Salar | Deh Now-e Sheykh Ali Khan | Deh Now-e Yarahmadi | Deh Now-ye Gonbaki | Deh Pish-e Olya | Deh Pish-e Olya | Deh Pish-e Sofla | Deh Pish-e Sofla | Deh Qotb ol Din | Deh Rais | Deh Redin | Deh Rud | Deh Salar-e Yek | Deh Shahdust | Deh Shahik | Deh Shahverdi-ye Sofla | Deh Shaib-e Olya | Deh Shaib-e Sofla | Deh Sheykh Morghazi | Deh Sheykh | Deh Shirak | Deh Vali | Deh Zarchi | Deh Zard | Deh Zir | Dehaj | Dehan | Deh-e Abbas | Deh-e Abdollah | Deh-e Ali | Deh-e Ali | Deh-e Arjomand | Deh-e Ashraf | Deh-e Ashur-e Bala | Deh-e Bala | Deh-e Bala | Deh-e Bala | Deh-e Bala | Deh-e Bala | Deh-e Bala | Deh-e Bala | Deh-e Banan-e Bala | Deh-e Bazuiyeh | Deh-e Daran | Deh-e Davai | Deh-e Do Mand | Deh-e Eslam | Deh-e Esmail | Deh-e Gajun | Deh-e Geluband | Deh-e Gerduiyeh | Deh-e Godar | Deh-e Gowd | Deh-e Gowd | Deh-e Guyieh | Deh-e Hasan Ali | Deh-e Hut | Deh-e Iraj | Deh-e Kafi | Deh-e Kan | Deh-e Khan | Deh-e Khoshk | Deh-e Khvajeh | Deh-e Kulak | Deh-e Larz | Deh-e Lulu | Deh-e Malek | Deh-e Masud | Deh-e Milan | Deh-e Mir | Deh-e Mir | Deh-e Mirza | Deh-e Mirzai | Deh-e Molla | Deh-e Morad | Deh-e Morghi | Deh-e Morghu | Deh-e Morteza | Deh-e Nab Khush | Deh-e Naiyeh | Deh-e Negari | Deh-e Nezam | Deh-e Now | Deh-e Now-e Jameh | Deh-e Now-e Kahan | Deh-e Now-ye Ali Shahri | Deh-e Pain | Deh-e Pak | Deh-e Poshteh | Deh-e Qazi | Deh-e Qazi | Deh-e Qazi-ye Yek | Deh-e Rayi | Deh-e Reza | Deh-e Rostam | Deh-e Rud Musevi | Deh-e Sajer | Deh-e Salahi | Deh-e Sardi | Deh-e Segi | Deh-e Seraj | Deh-e Seyf | Deh-e Seyyedha | Deh-e Shaduiyeh | Deh-e Shayhak | Deh-e Sheykh Soltan Abdollah | Deh-e Sheykh | Deh-e Sheykh | Deh-e Sheykh | Deh-e Sheykh-e Do | Deh-e Shib | Deh-e Shib | Deh-e Shoeyb-e Do | Deh-e Shur Akhund | Deh-e Soltanabad | Deh-e Tak | Deh-e Tavakkol | Deh-e Vasat | Deh-e Viran | Deh-e Yaqub | Deh-e Zanan | Deh-e Ziar | Deh-e Zuiyeh | Dehkadeh | Dehkaran | Dehnagareh | Dehnow | Dehnow | Dehnow-e Amlak | Dehnow-e Ansari | Dehnow-e Chahdegan | Dehnow-e Eslamabad | Dehnow-e Fath ol Mobin | Dehnow-e Hajj Ali Mohammad | Dehnow-e Jari | Dehnow-e Kasurak | Dehnow-e Mich | Dehnow-e Mohammad Khan | Dehnow-e Salehabad | Dehnow-e Sang | Dehnow-e Seh | Dehnow-e Shahsavar Khan | Dehnow-e-Kuhestan | Dehnowiyeh | Dehnow-ye Herzang | Dehu | Dehu | Dehuiyeh | Dehuiyeh | Dehuiyeh | Dehuiyeh | Dehuj | Dehuj | Dehuj | Dera | Derijan | Derraz | Derzerb | Desk | Desk | Desk-e Bala | Deymeskan | Didarak | Difeh Aqa | Digabad | Dijuiyeh | Dikhuiyeh | Dishgan | Divan Morad-e Olya | Do Boneh | Do Char | Do Daran | Do Del | Do Kuhak | Dochahi | Dodungeh | Donbeh-ye Olya | Doqondar | Doran | Dorranabad | Dorudgu | Dow Sari | Dowghanan | Dowkestan | Dowlabad | Dowlatabad | Dowlatabad | Dowlatabad | Dowlatabad | Dowlatabad | Dowlatabad | Dowlatabad | Dowlatabad | Dowlatabad | Dowlatabad | Dowlatabad | Dowlatabad | Dowlatabad | Dowlatabad | Dowlatabad | Dowlatabad | Dowlatabad-e Ansari | Dowlatabad-e Kaffeh | Dowlatabad-e Seh | Dowzariv | Dozdan | Dozduiyeh | Dughabad | Dughabad | Dulab | Dulab | Dumar-e Meyani | Dumar-e Olya | Dumar-e Sofla | Durkan-e Bala | Durkan-e Pain | Dushan | Duzakh Darreh | Duzakh Darreh

=== E ===
Ebrahimabad | Ebrahimabad | Ebrahimabad | Ebrahimabad | Ebrahimabad | Ebrahimabad | Ebrahimabad | Ebrahimabad | Ebrahimabad | Ebrahimabad-e Dasht Bar | Ebrahimabad-e Deh Gavi | Ebrahimabad-e Do | Ebrahimabad-e Hajji | Ebrahimabad-e Jadid | Ebrahimabad-e Shur | Ebrahimabad-e Yek | Ebrahimabad-e Zarduiyeh | Ekhtiarabad | Ekhtyiarabad-e Do Ziyarati | Emadabad | Emamiyeh-ye Yek | Emamzadeh Seyyed Hoseyn Kornag | Emamzadeh Zakaria | Emamzadeh-ye Seyyed Ali | Enayatabad | Enayatabad | Esfand | Esfand | Esfandan | Esfichar | Esfurin-e Olya | Esfurin-e Sofla | Eshaqabad | Eshaqabad | Eshaqabad | Eshkafti | Eshkanuiyeh-ye Olya | Eshkoftuiyeh | Eshkur | Eshqabad | Eshratabad | Esker | Eslamabad | Eslamabad | Eslamabad | Eslamabad | Eslamabad | Eslamabad | Eslamabad | Eslamabad | Eslamabad | Eslamabad | Eslamabad | Eslamabad | Eslamabad | Eslamabad-e 21 | Eslamabad-e Chah Narenj | Eslamabad-e Darvish Khanka | Eslamabad-e Dowlatabad | Eslamabad-e Kahan Changar | Eslamabad-e Kahur Khoshk | Eslamabad-e Sar Meydan | Eslamabad-e Yek | Eslamiyeh | Esmailabad | Esmailabad | Esmailabad | Esmailabad | Esmailabad | Esmailabad | Esmailabad | Esmailabad | Esmaili Olya | Esmaili Sofla | Esmaili | Esmatabad | Espasuiyeh | Espigan | Estabraq | Estahuiyeh | Estaj | Estakhr-e Garuk | Estakhrha | Estakhruiyeh | Estakhruiyeh | Estarm | Estehkam | Estur | Eyn ol Baqar | Eyshabad | Eyshabad | Eyzadiyeh | Ezzatabad

=== F ===
Fadua | Fahraj | Fakhrabad | Fakhrabad | Fakhrabad | Fakhrabad-e Yek | Faqirabad | Farahabad | Farizan-e Olya | Farizan-e Sofla | Farkan | Farrokh Dasht | Farrokhabad | Farrokhabad | Farrokhabad | Faryab | Fasemabad-e Hajji | Fathabad | Fathabad | Fathabad | Fathabad | Fathabad | Fathabad | Fathabad | Fathabad | Fathabad | Fathabad | Fathabad | Fathabad | Fathabad | Fathabad | Fathabad | Fathabad | Fathabad-e Shur | Fathabad-e Yazdanabad | Fathiyeh | Fayezi | Fedij | Fekrabad | Felfelabad | Fendoqa | Ferdows | Ferdows | Ferdowsiyeh | Ferdowsiyeh | Fereydun | Feyzabad | Feyzabad | Feyzabad | Feyzabad | Feyzabad | Fidkuiyeh | Firuz | Firuzabad | Firuzabad | Firuzabad | Firuzabad | Firuzabad | Fusk

=== G ===
Gach-e Olya | Gach-e Sofla | Gachin | Gahuiyeh | Gahuiyeh | Gajgin | Galdan | Galleh Baghan | Galu Anar | Galu Gazer | Galu Hanna | Galu Kondeh | Galu Rud | Galu Salar | Galugah | Galuiyeh | Galupadeh | Galuzardab | Ganab | Gandab | Ganjabad | Ganjabad-e Do | Ganjabad-e Olya | Ganjabad-e Sofla | Ganjabad-e Yek | Garai | Garak | Garakuiyeh | Garbeh | Gardin | Gargaz | Gari Charban | Garich | Garik | Garin | Gari-ye Bala | Gari-ye Pain | Garkab | Garkuiyeh | Garm Salar Reza | Garm Zir | Garma | Garmeshk | Garu | Garuchan | Garuk | Gasholkhi | Gatkuiyeh | Gav Mordeh | Gavahnchan | Gavar | Gavbandan | Gavcharan | Gavehsoltani | Gavestan | Gavkan-e Bagh | Gavkan-e Guran | Gavkosh | Gaz Boland | Gaz Boland | Gaz Kohan | Gaz Saleh-e Olya | Gaz Saleh-e Sofla | Gaz Sardi-ye Shahabad | Gazabad | Gazabad | Gazabad | Gazabad | Gazabad-e Manuchehri | Gazak | Gazan Khvast | Gazbar | Gazdan | Gazdan | Gazdar | Gaz-e Lang | Gazestan | Gazhak | Gazinuiyeh | Gazk | Gazkan | Gazmand | Gazuiyeh Cheshmeh Khandali | Gazuiyeh | Gazuiyeh | Gazuiyeh | Gehdich | Gelab | Geliguran | Gelu | Gelu | Geluchar | Gemin | Genarestan | Genayit | Genuiyeh | Geranak | Gerash | Gerdab | Gerdin | Gerdu Chub | Gerdustan | Gerinuiyeh | Geshmiran | Geshnizuiyeh | Gevar-e Olya | Gevar-e Sofla | Gezdunak | Gez-e Gerd | Gez-e Gerd | Ghadirderaz | Ghadirzir | Ghaffarabad | Gharibabad | Ghik-e Sheykhha | Ghobeyra | Gholam Shahiki | Gholurabad | Giahan | Gijuiyeh | Gijuiyeh | Gilumand | Gimord | Girkan | Gisheh | Gishigan | Gishigan-e Bala | Gishkan | Gishu | Gitari | Gitiabad | Givad Khater | Givaran | Godar Sabz | Godar Takht | Godar-e Zard | Godneh | Goharak | Gohord | Gohort | Gojg | Gol Dasteh | Gol Gran Rig | Gol Kandi | Gol Malek | Golabad | Golanabad | Golbaf | Gol-e Sorkh | Golestan | Golestan | Golestan | Golestan | Goli Nuiyeh | Golshan | Golzar | Gomtuiyeh | Gonbad Bahram | Gonbadan | Gonbad-e Mahuiyeh | Gonj Kesur | Gonjan | Gonuiyeh | Goraghan-e Tangan | Goranj | Gorazi | Gorgabad | Gorgin | Gorguiyeh | Goruh | Gosaviyeh | Gostuiyeh | Gowd Mahi | Gowd-e Alangu | Gowd-e Gerd | Gowd-e Giru | Gowd-e Hadi | Gowd-e Howz | Gowd-e Konark | Gowd-e Pain | Gowd-e Sorkh | Gowdpadeh | Gowjar | Gowk | Gowrsan | Gowrun | Gowtanur | Gozgestan | Gozm | Gozuiyeh-ye Olya | Gozuiyeh-ye Sofla | Gudar | Gudazran | Gud-e Lasiah | Gudkan-e Yek | Guhrej | Guneh-ye Gachuyi | Guneh-ye Gameru | Gur Saruiyeh | Gurab-e Jomeh | Gurahi | Gurak-e Do | Gurchuiyeh | Gur-e Bizhan | Gurik | Gurit | Gurkani | Gurkheri | Guru | Gush Torki | Guyin | Guzakestan |

=== H ===
Hadiabad | Hafezabad | Haft Badam | Hajat | Hajazi | Hajguiyeh | Hajin | Hajj Kaka | Hajj Qalandar | Hajjiabad | Hajjiabad | Hajjiabad | Hajjiabad | Hajjiabad | Hajjiabad | Hajjiabad | Hajjiabad-e Do | Hajjiabad-e Hajj Ali Mohammad | Hajjiabad-e Mir Hoseyni | Hajjiabad-e Nazri | Hajjiabad-e Payabi | Halil Rud | Halilehi | Hamidabad | Hamidabad | Hamidabad | Hamidabad | Hamidiyeh | Hamidiyeh | Hamsij | Hamzehi | Hangar-e Pain | Hanjan | Hanjarak-e Bala | Hanjaruiyeh | Hanza | Hanza | Hanzaf | Hararan | Hargondi | Harmuiyeh | Harnashak | Hasanabad | Hasanabad | Hasanabad | Hasanabad | Hasanabad | Hasanabad | Hasanabad | Hasanabad | Hasanabad | Hasanabad | Hasanabad-e Chah Degan | Hasanabad-e Dabirnezam | Hasanabad-e Deh Gavi | Hasanabad-e Deh Koreh | Hasanabad-e Jahanabad | Hasanabad-e Mehrab Jan | Hasanabad-e Navvab | Hasanabad-e Nazarian | Hasanabad-e Nushabad | Hasanabad-e Olya | Hasanabad-e Shahzadeh | Hasanabad-e Sofla | Hasanabad-e Yek | Hasanabad-e Yek | Hasanabad-e Zandi | Hasanabad-e Zeh Kalut | Hasharabad | Hasharabad | Hasharabad | Hashemabad | Hashemabad | Hashemabad | Hashish | Hashtadan | Hast Muiyeh | Havij | Hekematabad | Hekmatabad-e Pain | Hemmatabad | Hemmatabad | Hemmatabad | Hemmatabad | Hemmatabad | Hemmatabad-e Agah | Hemmatabad-e Chah Zahra-ye Bala | Hemmatabad-e Chah-e Malek | Hemmatabad-e Gol Mohammad | Hemmatabad-e Olya | Hemmatabad-e Olya | Hemmatabad-e Sofla | Hemmatabad-e Vahab | Hendim | Hendiz | Henek | Hengaran | Henguiyeh | Henguiyeh | Henguiyeh | Henjam | Henkayi | Herarun | Heruz-e Olya | Heruz-e Sofla | Hesaruiyeh | Heshmatabad | Heydarabad | Heydarabad | Heydarabad | Heydarabad | Heydarabad | Heydarabad | Heydarabad | Heydarabad | Heydarabad-e Chah Narenj | Heydarabad-e Sohrab | Heydarkhani | Heykuiyeh | Heyr Galu | Hezargaz | Hikan-e Bala | Hineman | Hir Shahabad | Hishin-e Olya | Hishin-e Sofla | Hojedk | Hojjatabad | Hojjatabad | Hojjatabad | Hojjatabad | Hojjatabad | Hojjatabad | Hojjatabad | Hojjatabad | Hojjatabad | Hojjatabad | Hojjatabad | Hojjatabad-e Sardi | Hojjatabad-e Yazdiha | Hojjati | Homqavand | Honuj | Horjand | Hormak | Hormozabad | Hosen | Hosenabad-e Bala | Hosenabad-e Pain | Hoseyn Qoli | Hoseynabad | Hoseynabad | Hoseynabad | Hoseynabad | Hoseynabad | Hoseynabad | Hoseynabad | Hoseynabad | Hoseynabad | Hoseynabad | Hoseynabad | Hoseynabad | Hoseynabad | Hoseynabad | Hoseynabad | Hoseynabad-e Ab Shur | Hoseynabad-e Abdollah | Hoseynabad-e Akhund | Hoseynabad-e Alam Khan | Hoseynabad-e Ali Akbarkhan | Hoseynabad-e Chahar | Hoseynabad-e Dam Dahaneh | Hoseynabad-e Dehdar | Hoseynabad-e Derakhti | Hoseynabad-e Do | Hoseynabad-e Do | Hoseynabad-e Do | Hoseynabad-e Emami | Hoseynabad-e Eslami | Hoseynabad-e Fazeli | Hoseynabad-e Ghafuri | Hoseynabad-e Harandi | Hoseynabad-e Hormeh | Hoseynabad-e Jadid | Hoseynabad-e Jadid | Hoseynabad-e Khan | Hoseynabad-e Khan | Hoseynabad-e Khani | Hoseynabad-e Khani | Hoseynabad-e Khoda Bandeh | Hoseynabad-e Latabad | Hoseynabad-e Luli | Hoseynabad-e Madvar | Hoseynabad-e Mahunak | Hoseynabad-e Mazafari | Hoseynabad-e Molla Amir | Hoseynabad-e Morad Khan | Hoseynabad-e Nezhadi | Hoseynabad-e Olya | Hoseynabad-e Posht-e Rud | Hoseynabad-e Robat | Hoseynabad-e Rud Shur | Hoseynabad-e Rumani | Hoseynabad-e Sar Jangal | Hoseynabad-e Sargel | Hoseynabad-e Sargorij | Hoseynabad-e Sarhang | Hoseynabad-e Shafi | Hoseynabad-e Sofla | Hoseynabad-e Vakil | Hoseynabad-e Vali Mohammad | Hoseynabad-e Zeh Kalut | Hoseynabad-e Zinabad | Hoseynabad-e Zirki | Hotkan | Hukerd | Hum ol Din | Hur | Hur | Hurab | Huruiyeh | Hushfat | Hutak

=== I ===
Isaabad | Izadabad | Izadabad |

=== J ===
Jadval-e Now | Jafarabad | Jafarabad | Jafarabad | Jafarabad | Jafarabad | Jafarabad | Jafarabad | Jafarabad | Jafarabad | Jafarabad | Jafriz | Jagan | Jagan | Jaghdari | Jah Heydarbal | Jahadabad | Jahadabad | Jahadabad | Jahan Najan | Jahan Shahi | Jahanabad | Jahanabad | Jahanabad-e Bala | Jahanabad-e Deh Nazer | Jahanabad-e Pain | Jahr | Jalalabad | Jalalabad | Jalalabad | Jalalabad | Jalalabad | Jalalabad | Jalalabad | Jalaliyeh-ye Hajeri | Jamalabad | Jamalabad | Jamalabad-e Qadiri | Jamilabad | Jamshahi | Jamshidabad | Jamtan | Jangah | Jangal Shur | Jangalabad | Jangalabad | Jangalabad | Jangalabad | Jangalabad | Jangalabad-e Bala | Jangalabad-e Pain | Jangal-e Gorgi | Jangali | Jannatabad | Jannatabad | Jannatabad | Jannatabad | Jannatabad | Jannatabad-e Yek | Jannat-e Mortazavi | Jari | Jark | Jarub | Jatu | Javadiyeh ol Hiyeh | Javadiyeh-ye Mortazavi | Javaran | Jazin | Jazman | Jebalbarez | Jegah | Jehadabad | Jeriskhan | Jeshar | Jeshmeh Baneh | Jezfatan-e Olya | Jezfatan-e Sofla | Jikalaksheteh | Jirestan | Jiroft | Jonuk | Jorjafak | Jowchar | Jowkar-e Mehdi | Jowkar-e Shafi | Jowshan | Jowyiviyeh | Jowz Ali | Jowzam | Jowzam | Jowzkar | Jowzuiyeh | Jowzuiyeh | Jughan | Jughan | Jujeng | Jupar | Jurkan | Jushin | Juybadam | Juzanan | Juzuiyeh | Juzurak

=== K ===
Kabir | Kabudan | Kabutar Khan | Kadbak | Kafriz | Kagharaki | Kahak-e Esfij | Kahak-e Fathabad | Kahak-e Zardasht | Kahan | Kahanguiyeh | Kahdan | Kahgan | Kahgehan | Kahn Qaleh | Kahn | Kahn | Kahn | Kahnak | Kahnak | Kahn-e Cheragh | Kahn-e Gholam | Kahn-e Mahalleh-ye Bala | Kahn-e Mahalleh-ye Pain | Kahn-e Mur | Kahn-e Nowruz | Kahn-e Qazi | Kahn-e Razan | Kahn-e Safar | Kahn-e Siyah | Kahnok | Kahnuh-e Modim | Kahnuj | Kahnuj Sadat | Kahnuj | Kahnuj | Kahnuj | Kahnuj | Kahnuj | Kahnuj | Kahnuj | Kahnuj-e Damaneh | Kahnuj-e Moezabad | Kahnuj-e Shahrokhi | Kaht | Kahtubak | Kahtuiyeh | Kahtukorha | Kahuiyeh-ye Olya | Kahur Beygi | Kahur Deraz | Kahur Deraz | Kahur Lut | Kahur | Kahurabad | Kahurabad | Kahurabad-e Chahchupan-e Do | Kahurabad-e Sohrabi | Kahurmiri | Kahurnarenjak | Kajuiyeh | Kakh | Kal Karimi | Kal Khargushi | Kal Kuhi | Kal Maridan | Kal Meshk | Kal Zanguiyeh | Kalab-e Sufian-e Olya | Kalab-e Sufian-e Sofla | Kalahun-e Bala | Kalasheh | Kalatak | Kalatang | Kalat-e Malek | Kalejak | Kaleshkabad | Kalilan | Kalitu | Kaliyan | Kaljak | Kallehgan | Kalpurehi | Kalu Gondeh | Kaluiyeh | Kalumenan | Kam Sorkh | Kamalabad | Kamalabad | Kamalabad | Kamarusak-e Bala | Kamarusak-e Pain | Kam-e Sefid-e Sofla | Kam-e Sorkh | Kamesh | Kamraniyeh-ye Bala | Kamraniyeh-ye Pain | Kamshoku | Kamukhoshk | Kanataki | Kang | Kangari | Kangari | Kangaru | Kangeh | Kanguiyeh | Kantuiyeh | Kapari | Kar Chiska | Karah | Karamahi | Karangu | Kareshk | Karevangah | Kargah Jehad | Karig | Karigan | Kariguiyeh | Karim Dark | Karimabad | Karimabad | Karimabad | Karimabad | Karimabad | Karimabad | Karimabad | Karimabad-e Abnil | Karimabad-e Ansari | Karimabad-e Gavkhaneh | Karimabad-e Hajj Ali | Karimabad-e Olya | Karimabad-e Olya | Karimabad-e Posht-e Dig | Karimabad-e Robat | Karimabad-e Sardar | Karimabad-e Sargorich | Karimabad-e Sofla | Karimabad-e Tabasi | Karin | Karpuiyeh | Karrur | Karuk | Karzuiyeh | Kasagu | Kashkuiyeh | Kashkuiyeh | Kashnal | Katekalagh | Kavaru | Kaviran | Kaviz-e Olya | Kaviz-e Sofla | Kavusabad | Kayin | Kazemabad | Kazemabad | Kazemabad | Kazemabad | Kazemabad | Kazemabad | Kazemabad | Kechengan | Kedreng | Kerchkan | Kerkak | Kerman | Kerman Ahak | Kermani | Keshik | Keshit | Keshit | Keshit | Keshtuiyeh | Kesmun | Key Gin | Keykhosravi | Khabar | Khabar | Khadang | Khademiyeh | Khafkuiyeh | Khafkuiyeh | Khak Shahi | Khak-e Sefid-e Bala | Khaki-ye Olya | Khaleng | Khaleqabad | Khaleqabad | Khaleqabad | Khaleqabad | Khaleqabad | Khaleqabad | Khaleqabad | Khaleseh Divani | Khaliji | Khalilabad | Khalilabad | Khalilabad | Khaneh Khatun | Khaneh Reghan | Khankuiyeh | Khanmakan | Khanuk | Khardan | Khardan-e Do | Khardeh-ye Dehqan | Khardun | Khargushabad | Khargushki | Kharkuiyeh | Kharman Deh | Kharman Sukhteh | Khatib | Khatmabad | Khatun Mordeh | Khatunabad | Khatunabad | Khatunabad | Khatunabad | Khatunabad-e Mohimi | Khenaman | Kheyrabad | Kheyrabad | Kheyrabad | Kheyrabad | Kheyrabad | Kheyrabad | Kheyrabad | Kheyrabad | Kheyrabad | Kheyrabad | Kheyrabad-e Kaffah | Kheyrabad-e Olya | Khezrabad | Khich | Khodadad | Khomruduiyeh | Khomruduiyeh | Khomrutuiyeh | Khorramabad | Khorramabad | Khorramdarreh | Khorramshahi | Khoshk Rud | Khoshkar | Khosravani | Khosrowabad | Khosrowabad | Khotba | Khudrowsazi | Khukestan | Khun Sorkh | Khunag | Khuri | Khursand | Khursand | Khushkar | Khvajeh Askar | Khvajeh Nezam-e Chahar Dang | Khvajeh Soheyl | Khvajehabad | Khvajehi | Khvod Rahi | Khvorand | Khvoruiyeh | Kian Shahr | Kinan | Kinegan | Kochkahur | Kod Rud-e Yek | Kodur-e Bala | Kodur-e Pain | Kohan Chenar | Kohan-e Pancharak | Kohan-e Sabz | Kohanshahr-e Olya | Kohanshahr-e Sofla | Kohuiyeh | Kolaabad | Kolahabad | Koldan | Koldan | Koldan-e Olya | Konar Kaj | Konar Miri | Konar Sabz | Konar Sandal | Konar Zaghan | Konaran | Konardang | Konar-e Gavan | Konar-e Jamal | Konarestan | Konarestan-e Sofla | Konarnayi | Konarreshki | Konartajagi | Konaru | Konaruiyeh | Konatabad | Kondor | Korang | Kordan | Kordbastan | Kork | Korom | Korran | Korugan | Koshguiyeh | Koshkuiyeh | Kotk | Kowsar Riz | Kuguiyeh | Kuh Nimeh | Kuh Sefid | Kuhbanan | Kuhestan | Kuhsar-e Bala | Kuhsenjan | Kujak | Kulgan | Kurgah | Kurgeh | Kushk | Kushk-e Borj | Kushk-e Kalejak | Kushk-e Mardan | Kushk-e Mur | Kushk-e Olya | Kushk-e Sofla | Kushkuiyeh | Kutak-e Pain | Kutak-e Vasat | Kutur

=== L ===
La Gerdu | Lab Feravan | Lachabad | Lachabad | Ladu | Lahijan | Lajarab | Lalehzar | Langabad | Langar | Langar | Lard Kharan | Lard Midan | Larian | Latala | Lay Khurin | Lay Shokerkuiyeh | Lotfabad | Lotfabad | Lotfabad | Lotfabad-e Shur | Lowgerd | Luk-e Pa | Luk-e Pa-e Jadid |

=== M ===
Madbun | Madim-e Olya | Madin | Madin | Madun | Madvar | Mafan | Magasi | Maghuiyeh-ye Sofla | Magu | Mahaban | Mahajerin Estij | Mahan | Maharkash | Mahi Dasht | Mahjerd | Mahmanak | Mahmudabad Mazaheri | Mahmudabad | Mahmudabad | Mahmudabad | Mahmudabad | Mahmudabad | Mahmudabad | Mahmudabad | Mahmudabad-e Azali | Mahmudabad-e Borumand | Mahmudabad-e Hoseyn Safar | Mahmudabad-e Seyyed | Mahmudabad-e Yek | Mahmudi | Mahmudiyeh | Mahmudiyeh | Mahmudiyeh | Mahmudiyeh | Mahmudiyeh-ye Bahrami | Mahnabad | Mahrinu | Mahtari Ziyarat | Mahtu | Mahtutabad | Mahunak | Makan Gorgan | Makhazen Naft | Maki | Maki | Makiabad | Malekabad | Malekabad | Malekabad | Malekabad | Malekabad | Malekabad | Malekabad | Mami | Mandusat Kashteh | Mandusti | Mani-ye Olya | Mansurabad | Mansurabad | Mansurabad | Manuiyeh | Manujan | Manzelabad | Maqsudabad | Mar Mord | Mara | Maran Galu | Maran Qaleh | Maran | Mardehek | Marduvar | Marghzark | Marian | Marich | Marj | Marz | Masandan | Mashi | Masinan | Masjed | Maskhareh | Mata | Mavai-ye Sofla | Mavai-ye Vasat | Mazar | Mazar-e Shaheda | Mazdakan-e Olya | Megesi | Mehdiabad | Mehdiabad | Mehdiabad | Mehdiabad | Mehdiabad-e Amin | Mehdiabad-e Aminiyan | Mehdiabad-e Moaven | Mehdiabad-e Olya | Mehdiabad-e Sardar | Mehdiabad-e Shur | Mehdiabad-e Taqi | Mehdiabad-e Vahed | Mehr Saleh | Mehrabad | Mehrabad | Mehrabad | Mehrabad | Mehregan | Mehruiyeh-ye Bala | Mehruiyeh-ye Pain | Menukin | Mes-e Sarcheshmeh | Meshk Abdan | Meshkan | Meshkenan | Meshtin | Meydan | Meydan | Meymand | Meysamabad | Mian Deh | Mian Deh | Mian Deh | Mian Deh | Mian Do Kuh | Mian Nahr | Mian Rud Ab | Mian Zamin | Miandoab | Mianju Ahmadabad | Mich | Miduk | Mijan | Mijan-e Olya | Mijan-e Sofla | Mil Saidi | Mir Shadi | Mirabad-e Abadi | Mirabad-e Ansari | Mirabad-e Arjormand | Mirabad-e Chah-e Malek | Mirabad-e Emam Qoli | Mirabad-e Rigan | Mirnal | Miyandaran | Miyanshahr | Mobarakabad | Mobarakeh | Mobarakeh | Modravan | Moezabad | Mogh Mohammad | Moghaviyeh | Moghisabad | Moghnar | Moghuiyeh | Mohammad Qoli-ye Sofla | Mohammad Saidi | Mohammadabad | Mohammadabad Golshan | Mohammadabad | Mohammadabad | Mohammadabad | Mohammadabad | Mohammadabad | Mohammadabad | Mohammadabad | Mohammadabad | Mohammadabad | Mohammadabad | Mohammadabad | Mohammadabad | Mohammadabad | Mohammadabad | Mohammadabad-e Ab Shirin | Mohammadabad-e Anbari | Mohammadabad-e Asghar Khan | Mohammadabad-e Bab Skakan | Mohammadabad-e Barkhvordar | Mohammadabad-e Chah-e Malek | Mohammadabad-e Darvish | Mohammadabad-e Deh Gavi | Mohammadabad-e Dehnow | Mohammadabad-e Do Ziyarati | Mohammadabad-e Do | Mohammadabad-e Gazuiyeh | Mohammadabad-e Geluski | Mohammadabad-e Gonbaki | Mohammadabad-e Gonbaki | Mohammadabad-e Herati | Mohammadabad-e Kalantar | Mohammadabad-e Kataki | Mohammadabad-e Meysam | Mohammadabad-e Mokhtar-e Yek | Mohammadabad-e Moshk | Mohammadabad-e Olya | Mohammadabad-e Qaleh Shahid | Mohammadabad-e Rud Shur | Mohammadabad-e Saqi | Mohammadabad-e Sar Haddi | Mohammadabad-e Seyyed | Mohammadabad-e Seyyed Jalal | Mohammadabad-e Seyyed Nezam | Mohammadabad-e Seyyedha | Mohammadabad-e Sheykh | Mohammadabad-e Shokur | Mohammadabad-e Sofla | Mohammadabad-e Tezerj | Mohammadiyeh | Mohammadiyeh | Mohiabad | Mohiabad | Mohsenabad | Mojtame-ye Chah Molla | Mokhtarabad | Mokhtarabad | Mokhtarabad | Molla Hajji | Moqarrab | Moradabad | Moradabad | Moradabad | Moradabad | Moradabad | Moradabad | Moradabad | Moradabad-e Chahgavari | Moradabad-e Posht Rig | Mordar | Morghab | Morghak-e Olya | Morrin | Moshk | Motaharabad-e Tajabad | Mowmenabad | Mowmenabad | Mowr-e Gur | Mowruiyeh | Mozaffarabad | Mozaffarabad | Mului | Mur Sorkh | Murdan | Murdan | Murdan | Murpahn-e Bala | Mursaruiyeh | Muruiyeh | Muruiyeh | Musaabad | Musaabad

=== N ===
Nadik | Naduiyeh-ye Miani | Naduiyeh-ye Olya | Naduiyeh-ye Sofla | Nag | Nahr Kemal | Nahr Khatun | Nahr-e Shir | Nahugan | Naimabad | Naimabad | Najaf Shahr | Najafabad | Najmabad | Nam Zad | Namahram | Naniz-e Olya | Naniz-e Sofla | Nanuk | Naqshuiyeh | Narab | Narabi | Naradeh | Naran | Naran-e Olya | Nargesan | Narju | Narkuiyeh | Narmand | Narmashir | Narp | Narrab | Nartich | Nasehabad | Naserabad | Naserabad | Naserabad | Naserabad | Naserabad-e Chah-e Malek | Naserabad-e Chahgavari | Naser-e Do Shahid Chamran | Naseri | Naseriyeh | Naseriyeh | Naseriyeh-ye Bala | Nask | Nasrabad | Nasrabad | Nasrabad | Natizabad | Navi-ye Shest | Nazarabad | Naziabad | Naziabad | Nazmabad | Nazmabad | Nazmabad | Nazuiyeh | Nedanamuiyeh | Negar | Negur | Nehzatabad | Nehzatabad | Nehzatabad | Nehzatabad | Nematabad | Nematabad | Nematabad-e Dokhtoran | Nematabad-e Rigan | Nemazja | Nemch | Ney Bid | Neyestan | Neysanak | Neyzan | Neyzar | Nezamabad | Nezamshahr | Nimek | Nimjerduiyeh | Nimrud | Nokhudan | Nomgaz | Noqsan-e Kapari | Nosratabad | Nosratabad | Nosratabad | Nosratabad | Nosratabad-e Seh Dangeh | Now Bahar | Now Boni | Now Dozu | Now Mahi | Now Qand | Nowdezh | Nowrudbar | Nurabad | Nurabad | Nurabad | Nurabad | Nurabad-e Do | Nurabad-e Yek | Nuriyeh | Nuvork

=== O ===
Omruduiyeh | Omruduiyeh | Ordlegan | Osfok |

=== P ===
Pa Mazar | Pa Mazar | Pa Qaleh | Pa Qaleh | Pa Sefid | Pabaneh | Pachenaran | Pachi | Pachil | Padeh Boland-e Olya | Padumabad | Pagodar | Pagodar | Pagodar | Pagodar-e Amjaz | Pain Darb-e Pain | Pain | Pakam | Pakash | Pakelat | Pakuh-e Sefid | Palangabad | Palki | Pambaiyeh | Pamikh | Panag | Panj Stareh | Pankan | Papedeh | Paqich Bandar | Paran Dar | Parig-e Tariqi | Pariz | Parmanuiyeh | Parnatabad | Parparuiyeh | Parsan | Parvand | Pas Langar | Pashishkuiyeh | Pashuiyeh | Pasib | Patak-e Bajgan | Patali | Patali | Patkan | Patomha | Pay Kuh-e Sefid | Pay Taq | Pay-e Zebr | Paygah-e Ashayiri | Pay-ye Sorkh | Pay-ye Tal | Pay-ye Tom | Pedeh | Pesujban | Pey Majan | Peydan Kuh | Pidafak | Pidanguiyeh | Piluiyeh | Pilum | Pir Gheyb-e Bala | Pir Hajji | Pir Kahur | Pir Kohan | Pir | Pirbiyabani | Piruzabad | Pish Osta | Pishizan | Pishkesh | Pizki | Pol-e Parvast | Pol-e Piran | Posht Juiyieh | Posht Khan | Posht Lor | Posht Marz | Posht Rud | Posht Shiran | Posht Sorkh | Posht-e Gar | Posht-e Geru | Posht-e Rud | Posht-e Sar | Posht-e Shek | Poshteh Hesar | Poshteh Karun | Poshteh Qaleh | Poshteh Shahan | Poshteh Zang | Poshteh | Poshteh-ye Barjan | Poshteh-ye Dulabad | Poshteh-ye Mazaj | Poshteh-ye Yek | Poshtkuh | Poshtkuh | Poshtqaleh | Potaki | Puraki | Purkan | Putar | Puzpalak

=== Q ===
Qadamgah-e Morteza Ali | Qaderabad | Qaderabad | Qaderabad | Qaderabad | Qadirpur | Qaemabad | Qaemabad | Qaemabad | Qaemiyeh | Qaemiyeh | Qaemiyeh-ye Do | Qalan | Qalandaran | Qalatuiyeh | Qalatuiyeh | Qaleh Askar | Qaleh Cheh | Qaleh Ganj | Qaleh Now | Qaleh Now | Qaleh Now | Qaleh Rigi | Qaleh Shahid | Qaleh | Qaleh-ye Askar | Qaleh-ye Azizabad | Qaleh-ye Bala | Qaleh-ye Bidan | Qaleh-ye Dokhtar | Qaleh-ye Gabri | Qaleh-ye Hoseyn Ali | Qaleh-ye Kontak | Qaleh-ye Now | Qanat Bid | Qanat Gav | Qanat Kalantar | Qanat Marvan | Qanat ol Bashar | Qanat Qazi | Qanat Siah | Qanat Sir | Qanat Sorkh | Qanat Tir | Qanat Zarshk-e Sofla | Qanat-e Ahmad | Qanat-e Barz | Qanat-e Bid | Qanat-e Farrokh | Qanat-e Garm | Qanat-e Kohan-e Deh Shoyib | Qanat-e Malek | Qanat-e Miri | Qanat-e Now | Qanat-e Now | Qanat-e Now | Qanat-e Saleh | Qanat-e Saman | Qanat-e Seh | Qanat-e Tut | Qanat-e Vali | Qanat-e Zangal | Qanatghestan | Qanbari | Qannad | Qarqatuiyeh | Qaryeh Ali | Qasabeh | Qasemabad | Qasemabad | Qasemabad | Qasemabad | Qasemabad | Qasemabad | Qasemabad-e Pir Almas | Qasr | Qasr-e Falanj | Qasr-e Mian | Qatar Gaz | Qatruiyeh | Qavamabad | Qavamabad | Qaziabad | Qeysariyeh | Qodratabad | Qodratabad | Qodratabad | Qodratabad | Qorbanabad | Qotbabad | Qotbiyeh | Quchabad-e Mohammad Khan |

=== R ===
Rabeh | Rabor | Rad Kuh | Rafiabad | Rafsanjan | Rafsanjan Airport | Rah Niz | Rahimabad | Rahimabad | Rahimabad-e Agah | Rahmatabad | Rahmatabad | Rahmatabad | Rahmatabad | Rahmatabad | Rahmatabad-e Deh-e Aqayi | Rahmatabad-e Do | Rahmatabad-e Kataki | Rahmatabad-e Mian Deran | Rahmatabad-e Moinzadeh | Rahmatabad-e Salehiha | Rain Qaleh | Raisabad | Rajugan | Rameshk | Ramjerd | Ramjerd-e Bala | Rashgurd | Rashidabad | Rashk-e Olya | Rashk-e Sofla | Rashk-e Vosta | Rashtin | Rashvan | Rask | Rask | Ratk | Ravamharan | Ravar | Ravnan | Rayen | Raz Galleh | Raz Shirin | Razavabad | Razaviyeh | Razdar | Razdar | Raziabad | Raziabad | Reisabad | Remu Darreh-ye Olya | Ren | Reshkan | Reyhan Shahr | Reyhan | Rezaabad | Rezaabad | Rezaabad | Rezaabad | Rezaabad | Rezaabad | Rezduki | Rezqabad | Rezvan | Rezvaniyeh | Rig Zardan | Rigabad | Rigabad | Rigabad | Rigabad | Rigabad | Rigabad | Rigabad | Rigabad | Rigabad | Rigak | Rigmatin | Rignabatak | Rigsalimi | Rigzar-e Riz | Riseh | Rizuiyeh | Robat | Robat | Rob-e Kohan | Rochan | Rogha | Roknabad | Roknabad-ye Do | Roknabad-ye Yek | Roqeh-ye Kabir | Roqeh-ye Soghirah | Rostamabad | Rostamabad | Rostamabad | Rostamabad-e Chah Degan | Rowshanabad | Rowzeh-ye Eram | Rozuiyeh | Ruchun-e Olya | Rud Ab-e Bala | Rud Ab-e Sofla | Rud Ab-e Vosta | Rud Farq | Rud Moshk | Rud Pahn | Rudbahi | Rudbar | Rudbar | Rudin | Rudin | Rudkhaneh | Rudkhaneh | Rudkhaneh-ye Kemal | Rudkhaneh-ye Soltani | Rudmadan | Rughanuiyeh | Rugushuiyeh-ye Olya | Rugushuiyeh-ye Sofla | Ruhabad | Rukerd | Rumarz-e Olya | Rumarz-e Sofla | Ruraz | Rustai Emam Ali | Rustai-ye Abbas Aba | Rustai-ye Abolfazl ebn Magh | Rustai-ye Aliabad | Rustai-ye Azadegan | Rustai-ye Bandku | Rustai-ye Chah-e Malek | Rustai-ye Choghuki | Rustai-ye Deh Reza | Rustai-ye Huruiyeh | Rustai-ye Kermat | Rustai-ye Mosteza Afan | Rustai-ye Shahid Beheshti | Rustai-ye Shahid Deh Qan Pur | Rustai-ye Shahid Kivan Mirshkari | Rustai-ye Shahid Saidi | Rustai-ye Shahid Salari | Rustai-ye Solmaniyeh | Rustai-ye Taleqani | Rustai-ye Tall Shiraz | Rustai-ye Vakilabad | Rustayi-ye Chadranshin Owrtin | Rustayi-ye Chahardeh Masum | Rutak | Ruzbehabad | Ruzkin

=== S ===
Saadatabad | Saadatabad | Saadatabad | Saadatabad | Sabluiyeh | Sabluiyeh | Sabz Gazi | Sabz Gezi | Sabz Pushan | Sabzan | Sabzeh Baluchi | Sabzuiyeh | Sadabad | Sadabad | Sadabad | Sadabad-e Sofla | Sadi | Sadrabad | Safayyeh | Safiabad | Safiabad | Saghari | Saghder | Sagherchuiyeh | Sahebabad | Sahebabad | Sahlavar | Saidabad | Saidabad | Saidabad | Saidabad | Saidabad | Saidabad | Saidabad-e Olya | Saidabad-e Shafipur | Saidabad-e Sofla | Saidi | Sajadiyeh | Saknan | Sakukan | Salarabad | Salariyeh | Salehabad | Salehabad | Salehabad-e Sofla | Salmanabad | Salmanabad | Salmaniyeh | Salmaniyeh | Samanjerd | Samsili | Sang Charak | Sang Kar | Sang | Sangabad | Sangabad | Sangdan | Sang-e Andaz | Sang-e Bahram | Sang-e Hasadi | Sang-e Kartu | Sang-e Kot | Sang-e Malideh | Sang-e Pahn | Sang-e Sayyad | Sangestan | Sangorah | Sangshekan | Sanguiyeh | Sanguiyeh | Saniabad | Sar Ashk | Sar Asiab | Sar Asiab-e Bala | Sar Asiab-e Pain | Sar Asiab-e Shesh | Sar Asiyab | Sar Bag-e Juzuiyeh | Sar Bagh | Sar Bagh-e Shah Hormozd | Sar Band | Sar Band-e Kasur | Sar Bog | Sar Cheshmeh | Sar Chil | Sar Dar | Sar Galleh | Sar Galu-ye Sar Asiab | Sar Garu | Sar Gaz Dehnow | Sar Gaz | Sar Gaz-e Pain | Sar Ghashk | Sar Godar | Sar Godar | Sar Jangal | Sar Jangal | Sar Jangal | Sar Jangal | Sar Keyvan | Sar Mowr | Sar Muran | Sar Nesa | Sar Parideh | Sar Posht | Sar Rig | Sar Shangan | Sar Shast | Sar Taavoneh | Sar Takht | Sar Tang-e Darrehi | Sar Tashtak | Sarab | Saran | Sarangi | Saranrab | Sarapardeh | Sarbala | Sarcheshmeh | Sarcheshmeh | Sarchinu Bala | Sarchinu Pain | Sardarmehr | Sardaz | Sarduiyeh | Sar-e Daru | Sar-e Pol | Sareh Kak | Sareshk | Sarfeh | Sargari | Sarhangar | Sarhanger | Sarkahnan | Sarkhani | Sarkhoshk | Sarkhuiyeh | Sarmolk | Sarmur | Sarneran | Sarney-ye Ashub | Sarras | Sarsanguiyeh | Sartakht | Sartanguiyeh | Sartelan | Saruj | Saruni-ye Olya | Saruni-ye Sofla | Sarv Tomin | Sarvand | Sarvaruq | Sarvedan | Sarvestan | Sarzeh | Sarzeh | Sarzeh-ye Sofla | Savaruiyeh-ye Chorbazan | Savidan | Sebotk | Sefid Baz | Sefid Khani | Sefidar | Sefidebrahim | Sefidmorad | Sefiduiyeh | Sefteh | Sefteh | Sefteh | Sefteh | Sefteh-ye Hoseyn Khan | Segheng | Seghin | Seghin | Segin | Seh Chah | Seh Chah | Seh Cheshmeh | Seh Daran | Seh Darreh | Seh Deran | Seh Kahur | Sekonj | Sekukan | Sendul | Senjed Boland-e Olya | Senjedkuh | Senjeduiyeh | Seyf ol Din | Seyf ol Din | Seyfabad | Seyfabad | Seyfabad-e Muqufeh | Seyyed Ali Shahidi | Seyyed Damaneh | Seyyed Morteza | Seyyedabad | Seyyedabad-e Ilkhani | Shaab Jereh | Shadab | Shadiabad | Shadian | Shafiabad | Shah Deraz | Shah Jahanabad | Shah Mansuri | Shah Nazari | Shahababad | Shahabad | Shahbaba | Shahbaba | Shahdad | Shahdad Shahiki | Shahid Reza Chah Nasiri | Shahid Shahmoradi Community | Shahidabad | Shahidabad | Shahidabad | Shahinu | Shahkahan | Shahmaran | Shahrabad | Shahrak Emam Khomeyni | Shahrak-e Saduqi | Shahrak-e Sahab ol Zeman | Shahrdan | Shahr-e Babak | Shahriyari | Shahrokhabad | Shahrokhabad | Shahrokhabad | Shahshiri | Shahzadeh Mohammad | Shaltukabad | Shamabad | Shamsabad | Shamsabad | Shamsabad | Shamsabad | Shamsabad | Shamsabad | Shamsabad | Shamsabad-e Chahdegal | Shamsabad-e Olya | Shams-e Gaz | Shamshir Gard | Shamshirabad | Shamzan-e Hiyet | Shamzan-e Jehadiyeh | Shamzun-e Chah Bagh | Shangestan | Sharafabad | Sharb-e Mah | Sharifabad | Sharifabad | Sharifabad | Sharifabad | Sharifabad | Sharifabad | Sharikabad | Sharikabad | Sharikabad | Sharikabad | Sharikabad | Sharikabad | Sharikabad-e Miluiyeh | Sharikabad-e Mokhtar Abbaslu | Sharikabad-e Olya | Shashkan | Shast Pich-e Olya | Shast Pich-e Sofla | Sheblak | Shekarabad | Shekarabad | Shekarabad | Shemilan | Shenguiyeh-ye Pain | Shenuiyeh | Shesh Tak | Sheyb-e Nasri | Sheykh Abdollah | Sheykh Jalali | Sheykhabad | Sheykhabad-e Chah Hajji | Shib Deh | Shib Kuh | Shib Zardi | Shirabad | Shirinabad | Shirinag | Shirinkenar | Shirkoshi | Shoghlabad | Shojaabad | Shojaabad-e Mohammad Ali | Shojaabad-e Pain | Showkatabad | Showqabad | Showq-e Olya | Showq-e Sofla | Shumehri | Shurab | Shurab | Shurabad | Shurabad | Shurabad | Shurabad-e Mehrab Khan | Shurabad-e Nur Mohammad | Shurak-e Do | Shurak-e Vosta | Shurani | Shurbaz-e Olya | Shuruiyeh-ye Olya | Si Pareh | Si Vin | Siah Kahur | Sik | Sikhvoran | Silabkhvor-e Bala | Silabkhvor-e Pain | Simak | Sinabad | Sineh Kuiyeh | Sineh-ye Ghaz | Siraki | Sirbenuiyeh | Sirch | Siriz | Sirjan | Sirjan Railway Station | Siruiyeh | Siyah Banuiyeh | Sodkuiyeh | Sohrab | Sohraj | Sohran-e Olya | Sohran-e Sofla | Sohran-e Vosta | Sohrang | Sohrani | Soleymanabad | Soleymaniyeh | Soltan Ab Rural Cooperative | Soltanabad | Soltanabad | Soltanabad | Soltanabad | Soltanabad | Sonteh | Sorkh Bid | Sorkh Qaleh | Sorkhakan | Sorkhan | Sorkhan | Sorkhavan | Sorkh-e Kan | Sorkh-e Kan | Sorkhu-e Olya | Sorkhu-e Sofla | Soveleh | Sowch-e Pain | Sowlan | Sowlan | Suhtal | Sukhtegan | Sukhteh Chal | Suluiyeh | Sungan | Sur Dar | Suragabad | Suragabad | Surak | Surgah | Surgan-e Olya | Surgan-e Sofla | Suru | Suruiyeh | Susefid | Suzan-e Olya | Suzanjan

=== T ===
Tabaq | Taherabad | Tahmineh | Tahrud | Tahtali | Tahuneh Ostad | Tahuneh-ye Qazi | Tajabad | Tajabad | Tajabad | Tajabad | Tajabad | Tajabad | Tajabad | Tajabad-e Do | Tajabad-e Kohneh | Tajabad-e Olya | Tajabad-e Yek | Takol Hasan | Takolabad | Takyeh | Takzeh | Takzeh | Talali | Taleqan | Talkheh Char | Tall Samand | Tall Siah | Tall-e Qadir | Tamer | Tamik | Taneyru | Tang Shah | Tang-e Kalan | Tang-e Quchan | Tang-e Sabz | Tanguiyeh | Taqarkuiyeh | Taqiabad | Taqiabad | Taqiabad | Taqiabad | Taqiabad | Tarababad | Taradeh | Taranj | Taraz | Tareh-ye Ahrar Abbasabad Molla Reza | Tarfeh | Targuiyeh | Tarikmah | Tarikuiyeh | Tarradeh | Tarz | Tashk | Tashuk | Tavakkolabad | Tavakkolabad | Tavakkolabad | Tavakkolabad | Tavakkolabad | Tavakkolabad | Tavakkolabad | Tavakkolabad | Tavakkolabad | Tavakkolabad | Tavakkolabad | Tavakkolabad | Tavakkolabad-e Amid | Tavakkolabad-e Do | Tavakkolabad-e Hanarmand | Tavakkolabad-e Ranjabar | Tavakkolabad-e Yek | Tavakkolabad-e Zeh Kalut | Taviq | Tayekan | Tehgak | Tejdanu | Terchun | Terj | Tezerj | Tezerj | Tezerj | Tezerj | Tezerj | Ti Daran | Ti Jeng | Tigh Siah | Tik Dar | Tik Khola | Tik Pish | Tikdar | Tikdar-e Pay Sang | Tilinuiyeh | Tinun | Tir Kaman | Tiran | Titubar | Titu-ye Pain | Tizahang | Tizeng | Tom Gavan | Tom Guran | Tombat-e Bala | Tombat-e Pain | Tombuiyeh | Tomesorkh | Tomgaran | Tomjangi | Tomzardan | Torab | Torang | Torkabad | Torkabad | Torkan | Torsh Kuh | Torshab-e Bala | Towhan | Tuderk | Tumeyri | Turig | Turig | Turig | Tutak-e Olya | Tutak-e Sofla | Tutan | Tutuiyeh

=== U ===
Udarj

=== V ===
Vagalugiaran | Vahdapar va Arbandi Sistani | Vahdatabad | Vahidabad | Vakilabad | Vakilabad | Vakilabad | Vakilabad | Vakilabad | Vakilabad | Valiabad | Valiabad | Valiabad | Valiabad | Vameqabad | Varamin | Vaset | Vavad

=== Y ===
Yahyaabad | Yahyaabad | Yakhmar | Yar Qoli Reyg | Yas Chaman | Yazdan Panah | Yazdan Shahr | Yunjeh Char | Yusefabad | Yusefabad | Yusefabad | Yusefabad | Yusefabad | Yusefabad | Yusefabad | Yusefabad-e Pain | Yusefabad-e Salar

=== Z ===
Zadabad | Zaftek Sargdar | Zagashk | Zaghdar | Zahmakan | Zahmatabad | Zahrud-e Pain | Zahruiyeh | Zaimabad | Zakeri | Zakht | Zamanabad | Zamanabad | Zamanabad | Zaman-e Sofla | Zamin Deraz | Zamin Konar | Zamin Mohammad | Zamin Sarv | Zamin-e Anjir | Zamin-e Bandabad-e Barik | Zamin-e Taghuk | Zamzerj | Zanai | Zangaruiyeh | Zangiabad | Zangiabad | Zangian | Zanguiyeh-ye Olya | Zanuqabad | Zar Dasht | Zarand | Zarbaran | Zarchestan | Zarchuiyeh | Zarchuiyeh-ye Do | Zard Aluiyeh | Zardnuiyeh | Zarduiyeh | Zargar-e Olya | Zari Bandu | Zarib | Zarin | Zarjuiyeh | Zarkuiyeh | Zarmeh | Zarrin Khul | Zarrinabad | Zaruiyeh-ye Olya | Zaruiyeh-ye Sofla | Zaruki | Zavar | Zavar-e Halkeh | Zayandeh Rud | Zazduiyeh | Zeh | Zeh-e Kalut | Zemin Seyb | Zendan | Zerkesht | Zeydabad | Zeydabad | Zeydabad | Zeynabad | Zeynabad | Zeynab-e Koshteh | Zeynalabad | Ziaabad | Ziarat | Ziarat-e Hezart Abbas | Ziarat-e Kot-e Gorg | Ziarat-e Malang | Ziarat-e Mir Meqdad | Ziarat-e Pir Karkan | Ziaratgah | Ziaratgah | Ziaratgah-e Pir Almas | Zil | Zirabad-e Zirab | Zirdan Zirun | Ziri | Ziyarat Boneh | Ziyarat Shah | Ziarat-e Bacheh | Zohan | Zoharkuh | Zumin | Zurak | Zuran

== Administratively ==
- {{Anar County}}
- {{Anbarabad County}}
- {{Arzuiyeh County}}
- {{Baft County}}
- {{Bam County}}
- {{Bardsir County}}
- {{Fahraj County}}
- {{Faryab County}}
- {{Jiroft County}}
- {{Kahnuj County}}
- {{Kerman County}}
- {{Kuhbanan County}}
- {{Manujan County}}
- {{Narmashir County}}
- {{Qaleh Ganj County}}
- {{Rabor County}}
- {{Rafsanjan County}}
- {{Ravar County}}
- {{Rigan County}}
- {{Rudbar-e Jonubi County}}
- {{Shahr-e Babak County}}
- {{Sirjan County}}
- {{Zarand County}}
