= Gerdu Chub, Sarduiyeh =

Gerdu Chub گردوچوب
- Village
- Location within Iran
- Coordinates: 29°14′13″N 57°18′12″E
- Country: Iran
- Province: Kerman
- County: Jiroft
- Bakhsh: Sarduiyeh
- Rural District: Sarduiyeh

Population (2006)
  - Total: 18
- Time zone: UTC+3:30 (IRST)
  - Summer (DST): UTC+4:30 (IRDT)

Gerdu Chub (Persian: گردوچوب, also Romanized as Gerdū Chūb; also known as Gerdoojoob, Gerdūchū’īyeh, and Kerdī Chow) is a village in Sarduiyeh Rural District, Sarduiyeh District, Jiroft County, Kerman Province, Iran. At the 2006 census, its population was 18, in 5 families.
