= Sorkhu-e Olya =

Sorkhu-e Olya سرخوعليا
- Village
- Location within Iran
- Coordinates: 28°38′53″N 57°01′39″E
- Country: Iran
- Province: Kerman
- County: Jiroft
- Bakhsh: Central
- Rural District: Esfandaqeh

Population (2006)
  - Total: 16
- Time zone: UTC+3:30 (IRST)
  - Summer (DST): UTC+4:30 (IRDT)

Sorkhu-e Olya (Persian: سرخوعليا, also Romanized as Sorkhū-e ‘Olyā) is a village in Esfandaqeh Rural District, in the Central District of Jiroft County, Kerman Province, Iran. At the 2006 census, its population was 16, in 4 families.
