= Anjir Bazuiyeh =

Anjir Bazuiyeh انجيربازوييه
- Village
- Location within Iran
- Coordinates: 28°56′39″N 57°39′25″E
- Country: Iran
- Province: Kerman
- County: Jiroft
- Bakhsh: Sarduiyeh
- Rural District: Dalfard

Population (2006)
  - Total: 84
- Time zone: UTC+3:30 (IRST)
  - Summer (DST): UTC+4:30 (IRDT)

Anjir Bazuiyeh (Persian: انجيربازوييه, also Romanized as Anjīr Bāzū’īyeh and Anjīr-e Bāzū’īyeh) is a village in Dalfard Rural District, Sarduiyeh District, Jiroft County, Kerman Province, Iran. At the 2006 census, its population was 84, in 23 families.
