= Sar Galu-ye Sar Asiab =

Village in Kerman, Iran

Sar Galu-ye Sar Asiab سرگلوي سراسياب
- Village
- Location within Iran
- Coordinates: 28°40′15″N 57°54′41″E
- Country: Iran
- Province: Kerman
- County: Jiroft
- Bakhsh: Jebalbarez
- Rural District: Rezvan

Population (2006)
  - Total: 60
- Time zone: UTC+3:30 (IRST)
  - Summer (DST): UTC+4:30 (IRDT)

Sar Galu-ye Sar Asiab (Persian: سرگلوي سراسياب, also Romanized as Sar Galū-ye Sar Āsīāb; also known as Sar Galū’īyeh and Sar Kalū) is a village in Rezvan Rural District, Jebalbarez District, Jiroft County, Kerman Province, Iran. At the 2006 census, its population was 60, in 11 families.
