= Sabzeh Baluchi =

Sabzeh Baluchi سبزه بلوچي
- Village
- Location within Iran
- Coordinates: 29°12′14″N 57°27′56″E
- Country: Iran
- Province: Kerman
- County: Jiroft
- Bakhsh: Sarduiyeh
- Rural District: Gevar

Population (2006)
  - Total: 18
- Time zone: UTC+3:30 (IRST)
  - Summer (DST): UTC+4:30 (IRDT)

Sabzeh Baluchi (Persian: سبزه بلوچي, also Romanized as Sabzeh Balūchī; also known as Sabz-e Balūchī) is a village in Gevar Rural District, Sarduiyeh District, Jiroft County, Kerman Province, Iran. At the 2006 census, its population was 18, in 4 families.
