= Zarrin Khul =

Zarrin Khul زرين خول
- Village
- Location within Iran
- Coordinates: 28°53′22″N 57°49′16″E
- Country: Iran
- Province: Kerman
- County: Jiroft
- Bakhsh: Jebalbarez
- Rural District: Saghder

Population (2006)
  - Total: 19
- Time zone: UTC+3:30 (IRST)
  - Summer (DST): UTC+4:30 (IRDT)

Zarrin Khul (Persian: زرين خول, also Romanized as Zarrīn Khūl and Zarrin Khool; also known as Zarī Khūl-e Pā’īn and Zarīn Khūl-e Pā’īn, and Zarrīn Khūl-e Pā’īn) is a village in Saghder Rural District, Jebalbarez District, Jiroft County, Kerman Province, Iran. At the 2006 census, its population was 19, in 4 families.
