= Gonbad Bahram =

Gonbad Bahram گنبدبهرام
- Village
- Location within Iran
- Coordinates: 29°12′48″N 57°39′37″E
- Country: Iran
- Province: Kerman
- County: Jiroft
- Bakhsh: Sarduiyeh
- Rural District: Gevar

Population (2006)
  - Total: 15
- Time zone: UTC+3:30 (IRST)
  - Summer (DST): UTC+4:30 (IRDT)

Gonbad Bahram (Persian: گنبدبهرام, also Romanized as Gonbad Bahrām and Gonbad-e Bahrām) is a village in Gevar Rural District, Sarduiyeh District, Jiroft County, Kerman Province, Iran. At the 2006 census, its population was 15, in 4 families.
