= Karah =

Karah كراه
- Village
- Location within Iran
- Coordinates: 28°59′32″N 57°36′57″E
- Country: Iran
- Province: Kerman
- County: Jiroft
- Bakhsh: Sarduiyeh
- Rural District: Dalfard

Area
  - Total: 1.32 km^{2} (0.51 sq mi)

Population (2006)
  - Total: 58
  - Density: 44/km^{2} (110/sq mi)
- Time zone: UTC+3:30 (IRST)
  - Summer (DST): UTC+4:30 (IRDT)

Karah (Persian: كراه, also Romanized as Karāh) is a village in Dalfard Rural District, Sarduiyeh District, Jiroft County, Kerman Province, Iran. At the 2006 census, its population was 58, in 12 families.
