= Qalandaran =

Qalandaran قلندران
- Village
- Location within Iran
- Coordinates: 29°17′00″N 57°10′00″E
- Country: Iran
- Province: Kerman
- County: Jiroft
- Bakhsh: Sarduiyeh
- Rural District: Sarduiyeh

Population (2006)
  - Total: 336
- Time zone: UTC+3:30 (IRST)
  - Summer (DST): UTC+4:30 (IRDT)

Qalandaran (Persian: قلندران, also Romanized as Qalandarān) is a village in Sarduiyeh Rural District, Sarduiyeh District, Jiroft County, Kerman Province, Iran. At the 2006 census, its population was 336, in 65 families.
