= Bagh Kuchek =

Bagh Kuchek باغ كوچك
- Village
- Location within Iran
- Coordinates: 28°41′50″N 57°54′55″E
- Country: Iran
- Province: Kerman
- County: Jiroft
- Bakhsh: Jebalbarez
- Rural District: Rezvan

Population (2006)
  - Total: 19
- Time zone: UTC+3:30 (IRST)
  - Summer (DST): UTC+4:30 (IRDT)

Bagh Kuchek (Persian: باغ كوچك, also Romanized as Bāgh Kūchek; also known as Bāgh Kocheh, Bāgh Kocheḩeh, and Bāgh Kūcheh) is a village in Rezvan Rural District, Jebalbarez District, Jiroft County, Kerman Province, Iran. At the 2006 census, its population was 19, in 4 families.
