= Gur-e Bizhan =

Gur-e Bizhan گوربيژن
- Village
- Location within Iran
- Coordinates: 28°57′28″N 57°53′44″E
- Country: Iran
- Province: Kerman
- County: Jiroft
- Bakhsh: Jebalbarez
- Rural District: Maskun

Population (2006)
  - Total: 95
- Time zone: UTC+3:30 (IRST)
  - Summer (DST): UTC+4:30 (IRDT)

Gur-e Bizhan (Persian: گوربيژن, also Romanized as Gūr-e Bīzhan; also known as Gūr Bīzān and Gūr-e Bīzan) is a village in Maskun Rural District, Jebalbarez District, Jiroft County, Kerman Province, Iran. At the 2006 census, its population was 95, in 24 families.
