= Paran Dar =

Paran Dar پراندر
- Village
- Location within Iran
- Coordinates: 29°13′57″N 57°14′16″E
- Country: Iran
- Province: Kerman
- County: Jiroft
- Bakhsh: Sarduiyeh
- Rural District: Sarduiyeh

Population (2006)
  - Total: 74
- Time zone: UTC+3:30 (IRST)
  - Summer (DST): UTC+4:30 (IRDT)

Paran Dar (Persian: پراندر, also Romanized as Parān Dar and Prān Dar) is a village in Sarduiyeh Rural District, Sarduiyeh District, Jiroft County, Kerman Province, Iran. At the 2006 census, its population was 74, in 15 families.
