= Qanat-e Miri =

Qanat-e Miri قناتميري
- Village
- Location within Iran
- Coordinates: 29°12′50″N 57°16′41″E
- Country: Iran
- Province: Kerman
- County: Jiroft
- Bakhsh: Sarduiyeh
- Rural District: Sarduiyeh

Population (2006)
  - Total: 414
- Time zone: UTC+3:30 (IRST)
  - Summer (DST): UTC+4:30 (IRDT)

Qanat-e Miri (Persian: قناتميري, also Romanized as Qanāt-e Mīrī) is a village in Sarduiyeh Rural District, Sarduiyeh District, Jiroft County, Kerman Province, Iran. At the 2006 census, its population was 414, in 68 families.
