= Bandar-e Shah Rokhi =

Bandar-e Shah Rokhi بندرشاه رخي
- Village
- Country: Iran
- Province: Kerman
- County: Jiroft
- Bakhsh: Sarduiyeh
- Rural District: Sarduiyeh

Population (2006)
  - Total: 42
- Time zone: UTC+3:30 (IRST)
  - Summer (DST): UTC+4:30 (IRDT)

Bandar-e Shah Rokhi (Persian: بندرشاه رخي, also Romanized as Bandar-e Shāh Rokhī) is a village in Sarduiyeh Rural District, Sarduiyeh District, Jiroft County, Kerman Province, Iran. At the 2006 census, its population was 42, in 7 families.
