= Rustai-ye Tall Shiraz =

Village in Iran

Rustai-ye Tall Shiraz (Persian: روستاي تل شيراز, also Romanized as Rūstāī-ye Tall Shīrāz) is a village in Jahadabad Rural District, in the Central District of Anbarabad County, Kerman Province, Iran. At the 2006 census, its population was 618, in 128 families.
