= Bid Kheyri, Jiroft =

Bid Kheyri بيدخيري
- Village
- Location within Iran
- Coordinates: 28°37′00″N 57°49′00″E
- Country: Iran
- Province: Kerman
- County: Jiroft
- Bakhsh: Central
- Rural District: Dowlatabad

Population (2006)
  - Total: 201
- Time zone: UTC+3:30 (IRST)
  - Summer (DST): UTC+4:30 (IRDT)

Bid Kheyri (Persian: بيدخيري, also Romanized as Bīd Kheyrī; also known as Bīd Kheri and Bīd Kheyr) is a village in Dowlatabad Rural District, in the Central District of Jiroft County, Kerman Province, Iran. At the 2006 census, its population was 201, in 45 families.
