= Gowtanur =

Gowtanur گاوتنور
- Village
- Location within Iran
- Coordinates: 28°52′00″N 57°52′00″E
- Country: Iran
- Province: Kerman
- County: Jiroft
- Bakhsh: Jebalbarez
- Rural District: Saghder

Population (2006)
  - Total: 16
- Time zone: UTC+3:30 (IRST)
  - Summer (DST): UTC+4:30 (IRDT)

Gowtanur (Persian: گاوتنور, also Romanized as Gowtanūr; also known as Gowd Tanūr) is a village in Saghder Rural District, Jebalbarez District, Jiroft County, Kerman Province, Iran. At the 2006 census, its population was 16, in 6 families.
