= Bandar Pirshahi =

Bandar Pirshahi بندرپيرشاهي
- Village
- Country: Iran
- Province: Kerman
- County: Jiroft
- Bakhsh: Jebalbarez
- Rural District: Rezvan

Population (2006)
  - Total: 20
- Time zone: UTC+3:30 (IRST)
  - Summer (DST): UTC+4:30 (IRDT)

Bandar Pirshahi (Persian: بندرپيرشاهي, also Romanized as Bandar Pīrshāhī) is a village in Rezvan Rural District, Jebalbarez District, Jiroft County, Kerman Province, Iran. At the 2006 census, its population was 20, in 5 families.
