= Darb-e Babazi =

Darb-e Babazi دربابازي
- Village
- Location within Iran
- Coordinates: 28°57′37″N 57°41′42″E
- Country: Iran
- Province: Kerman
- County: Jiroft
- Bakhsh: Sarduiyeh
- Rural District: Dalfard

Population (2006)
  - Total: 40
- Time zone: UTC+3:30 (IRST)
  - Summer (DST): UTC+4:30 (IRDT)

Darb-e Babazi (Persian: دربابازي, also Romanized as Darb-e Bābāzī) is a village in Dalfard Rural District, Sarduiyeh District, Jiroft County, Kerman Province, Iran. At the 2006 census, its population was 40, in 9 families.
