= Sar Keyvan =

Sar Keyvan سركيوان
- Village
- Location within Iran
- Coordinates: 28°57′13″N 57°38′46″E
- Country: Iran
- Province: Kerman
- County: Jiroft
- Bakhsh: Sarduiyeh
- Rural District: Dalfard

Population (2006)
  - Total: 65
- Time zone: UTC+3:30 (IRST)
  - Summer (DST): UTC+4:30 (IRDT)

Sar Keyvan (Persian: سركيوان, also Romanized as Sar Keyvān and Sar-e Keyvān) is a village in Dalfard Rural District, Sarduiyeh District, Jiroft County, Kerman Province, Iran. At the 2006 census, its population was 65, in 16 families.
