= Gilumand =

Gilumand گيلومند
- Village
- Location within Iran
- Coordinates: 29°13′12″N 57°35′24″E
- Country: Iran
- Province: Kerman
- County: Jiroft
- Bakhsh: Sarduiyeh
- Rural District: Gevar

Population (2006)
  - Total: 15
- Time zone: UTC+3:30 (IRST)
  - Summer (DST): UTC+4:30 (IRDT)

Gilumand (Persian: گيلومند, also Romanized as Gīlūmand; also known as Gīlūband) is a village in Gevar Rural District, Sarduiyeh District, Jiroft County, Kerman Province, Iran. At the 2006 census, its population was 15, in 4 families.
