= Rad Kuh =

Rad Kuh ردكوه
- Village
- Location within Iran
- Coordinates: 28°45′00″N 57°58′00″E
- Country: Iran
- Province: Kerman
- County: Jiroft
- Bakhsh: Jebalbarez
- Rural District: Rezvan

Population (2006)
  - Total: 19
- Time zone: UTC+3:30 (IRST)
  - Summer (DST): UTC+4:30 (IRDT)

Rad Kuh (Persian: ردكوه, also Romanized as Rad Kūh) is a village in Rezvan Rural District, Jebalbarez District, Jiroft County, Kerman Province, Iran. At the 2006 census, its population was 19, in 6 families.
