= Guneh-ye Gachuyi =

Guneh-ye Gachuyi گونه گاچوئي
- Village
- Country: Iran
- Province: Kerman
- County: Jiroft
- Bakhsh: Sarduiyeh
- Rural District: Dalfard

Population (2006)
  - Total: 21
- Time zone: UTC+3:30 (IRST)
  - Summer (DST): UTC+4:30 (IRDT)

Guneh-ye Gachuyi (Persian: گونه گاچوئي, also Romanized as Gūneh-ye Gāchūyī) is a village in Dalfard Rural District, Sarduiyeh District, Jiroft County, Kerman Province, Iran. At the 2006 census, its population was 21, in 4 families.
