= Deh-e Nezam =

Deh-e Nezam ده نظام
- Village
- Location within Iran
- Coordinates: 28°39′22″N 57°03′00″E
- Country: Iran
- Province: Kerman
- County: Jiroft
- Bakhsh: Central
- Rural District: Esfandaqeh

Population (2006)
  - Total: 29
- Time zone: UTC+3:30 (IRST)
  - Summer (DST): UTC+4:30 (IRDT)

Deh-e Nezam (Persian: ده نظام, also Romanized as Deh-e Neẓām; also known as Dehneẓām) is a village in Esfandaqeh Rural District, in the Central District of Jiroft County, Kerman Province, Iran. At the 2006 census, its population was 29, in 8 families.
