= Chenaran-e Do =

Chenaran-e Do چناران2
- Village
- Location within Iran
- Coordinates: 28°47′18″N 57°02′18″E
- Country: Iran
- Province: Kerman
- County: Jiroft
- Bakhsh: Central
- Rural District: Esfandaqeh

Population (2006)
  - Total: 153
- Time zone: UTC+3:30 (IRST)
  - Summer (DST): UTC+4:30 (IRDT)

Chenaran-e Do (Persian: چناران2, also Romanized as Chenārān-e Do; also known as Chenārān-e 'Olyā) is a village in Esfandaqeh Rural District, in the Central District of Jiroft County, Kerman province, Iran. At the 2006 census, its population was 153, in 26 families.
