= Sartanguiyeh =

Sartanguiyeh سرتنگوييه
- Village
- Location within Iran
- Coordinates: 28°58′11″N 57°53′17″E
- Country: Iran
- Province: Kerman
- County: Jiroft
- Bakhsh: Jebalbarez
- Rural District: Maskun

Population (2006)
  - Total: 56
- Time zone: UTC+3:30 (IRST)
  - Summer (DST): UTC+4:30 (IRDT)

Sartanguiyeh (Persian: سرتنگوييه, also Romanized as Sartangū’īyeh; also known as Sar Tangū) is a village in Maskun Rural District, Jebalbarez District, Jiroft County, Kerman Province, Iran. At the 2006 census, its population was 56, in 12 families.
