= Bab Kiki =

Bab Kiki بابكيكي
- Village
- Location within Iran
- Coordinates: 29°10′05″N 57°22′21″E
- Country: Iran
- Province: Kerman
- County: Jiroft
- Bakhsh: Sarduiyeh
- Rural District: Sarduiyeh

Population (2006)
  - Total: 38
- Time zone: UTC+3:30 (IRST)
  - Summer (DST): UTC+4:30 (IRDT)

Bab Kiki (Persian: بابكيكي, also Romanized as Bāb Kīkī) is a village in Sarduiyeh Rural District, Sarduiyeh District, Jiroft County, Kerman Province, Iran. At the 2006 census, its population was 38, in 7 families.
