= Dar-e Dask =

Dar-e Dask دردسك
- Village
- Location within Iran
- Coordinates: 28°52′18″N 57°52′32″E
- Country: Iran
- Province: Kerman
- County: Jiroft
- Bakhsh: Jebalbarez
- Rural District: Saghder

Population (2006)
  - Total: 460
- Time zone: UTC+3:30 (IRST)
  - Summer (DST): UTC+4:30 (IRDT)

Dar-e Dask (Persian: دردسك, also Romanized as Dar-e Desk and Dardesk; also known as Dar Dar, Dardez, and Dar-e Dashk) is a village in Saghder Rural District, Jebalbarez District, Jiroft County, Kerman Province, Iran. At the 2006 census, its population was 460, in 69 families.
