= Naqshuiyeh =

Naqshuiyeh نقشوييه
- Village
- Location within Iran
- Coordinates: 29°11′15″N 57°25′53″E
- Country: Iran
- Province: Kerman
- County: Jiroft
- Bakhsh: Sarduiyeh
- Rural District: Sarduiyeh

Population (2006)
  - Total: 132
- Time zone: UTC+3:30 (IRST)
  - Summer (DST): UTC+4:30 (IRDT)

Naqshuiyeh (Persian: نقشوييه, also Romanized as Naqshū’īyeh; also known as Nagshū and Naqshū) is a village in Sarduiyeh Rural District, Sarduiyeh District, Jiroft County, Kerman Province, Iran. At the 2006 census, its population was 132, in 22 families.
