= Mijan-e Olya =

Mijan-e Olya ميجان عليا
- Village
- Location within Iran
- Coordinates: 28°42′11″N 57°57′14″E
- Country: Iran
- Province: Kerman
- County: Jiroft
- Bakhsh: Jebalbarez
- Rural District: Rezvan

Population (2006)
  - Total: 179
- Time zone: UTC+3:30 (IRST)
  - Summer (DST): UTC+4:30 (IRDT)

Mijan-e Olya (Persian: ميجان عليا, also Romanized as Mījān-e ‘Olyā; also known as Mījān and Mījān-e Bālā) is a village in Rezvan Rural District, Jebalbarez District, Jiroft County, Kerman Province, Iran. At the 2006 census, its population was 179, in 39 families.
