= Qaleh-ye Gabri =

Qaleh-ye Gabri قلعه گبری
- Village
- Location within Iran
- Coordinates: 28°42′28″N 57°28′01″E
- Country: Iran
- Province: Kerman
- County: Jiroft
- Bakhsh: Central
- Rural District: Halil

Population (2006)
  - Total: 85
- Time zone: UTC+3:30 (IRST)
  - Summer (DST): UTC+4:30 (IRDT)

Qaleh-ye Gabri (Persian: قلعه گبري, also Romanized as Qal`eh-ye Gabrī; also known as Qalehgabra) is a village in Halil Rural District, in the Central District of Jiroft County, Kerman Province, Iran. At the 2006 census, its population was 85, in 20 families.
