= Guneh-ye Gameru =

Guneh-ye Gameru گونه گامرو
- Village
- Country: Iran
- Province: Kerman
- County: Jiroft
- Bakhsh: Sarduiyeh
- Rural District: Dalfard

Population (2006)
  - Total: 20
- Time zone: UTC+3:30 (IRST)
  - Summer (DST): UTC+4:30 (IRDT)

Guneh-ye Gameru (Persian: گونه گامرو, also Romanized as Gūneh-ye Gāmerū) is a village in Dalfard Rural District, Sarduiyeh District, Jiroft County, Kerman Province, Iran. At the 2006 census, its population was 20, in 5 families.
