= Bagh-e Babuiyeh =

Bagh-e Babuiyeh باغبابوئيه
- Village
- Location within Iran
- Coordinates: 28°33′36″N 57°43′29″E
- Country: Iran
- Province: Kerman
- County: Jiroft
- Bakhsh: Central
- Rural District: Khatunabad

Population (2006)
  - Total: 1,993
- Time zone: UTC+3:30 (IRST)
  - Summer (DST): UTC+4:30 (IRDT)

Bagh-e Babuiyeh (Persian: باغبابوئيه, also Romanized as Bāgh-e Bābū’īyeh; also known as Bāghbāghū’īyeh) is a village in Khatunabad Rural District, in the Central District of Jiroft County, Kerman Province, Iran. At the 2006 census, its population was 1,993, in 441 families.
