= Posht Marz =

Posht Marz پشت مرز
- Village
- Location within Iran
- Coordinates: 28°32′59″N 57°52′33″E
- Country: Iran
- Province: Kerman
- County: Jiroft
- Bakhsh: Central
- Rural District: Dowlatabad

Population (2006)
  - Total: 401
- Time zone: UTC+3:30 (IRST)
  - Summer (DST): UTC+4:30 (IRDT)

Posht Marz (Persian: پشت مرز; also known as Posht Marz-e ‘Alīābād) is a village in Dowlatabad Rural District, in the Central District of Jiroft County, Kerman Province, Iran. At the 2006 census, its population was 401, in 100 families.
