= Galuiyeh =

Galuiyeh گلوييه
- Village
- Location within Iran
- Coordinates: 28°50′28″N 57°12′37″E
- Country: Iran
- Province: Kerman
- County: Jiroft
- Bakhsh: Central
- Rural District: Esfandaqeh

Population (2006)
  - Total: 47
- Time zone: UTC+3:30 (IRST)
  - Summer (DST): UTC+4:30 (IRDT)

Galuiyeh (Persian: گلوييه, also Romanized as Galū’īyeh) is a village in Esfandaqeh Rural District, in the Central District of Jiroft County, Kerman Province, Iran. At the 2006 census, its population was 47, in 10 families.
