= Ab Panguiyeh =

Ab Panguiyeh اب پنگويئه
- Village
- Location within Iran
- Coordinates: 30°50′10″N 56°39′27″E
- Country: Iran
- Province: Kerman
- County: Zarand
- Bakhsh: Central
- Rural District: Vahdat

Population (2006)
  - Total: 487
- Time zone: UTC+3:30 (IRST)
  - Summer (DST): UTC+4:30 (IRDT)

Ab Panguiyeh (Persian: اب پنگويئه, also Romanized as Āb Pangū’īyeh, Ab Pangooeyeh, Ābpangū’īyeh, and Āb Pangūyeh; also known as Opāng) is a village in Vahdat Rural District, in the Central District of Zarand County, Kerman province, Iran. At the 2006 census, its population was 487, in 126 families.
