= Qanat Siah =

Qanat Siah قناتسياه
- Village
- Location within Iran
- Coordinates: 28°54′24″N 57°51′15″E
- Country: Iran
- Province: Kerman
- County: Jiroft
- Bakhsh: Jebalbarez
- Rural District: Maskun

Population (2006)
  - Total: 39
- Time zone: UTC+3:30 (IRST)
  - Summer (DST): UTC+4:30 (IRDT)

Qanat Siah (Persian: قناتسياه, also Romanized as Qanāt Sīāh, Qanāt-e Sīāh, Qanāt Seyah, and Qanāt Sīyāh; also known as Ghanat Siyah) is a village in Maskun Rural District, Jebalbarez District, Jiroft County, Kerman Province, Iran. At the 2006 census, its population was 39, in 9 families.
