= Parparuiyeh =

Parparuiyeh پارپاروئيه
- Village
- Location within Iran
- Coordinates: 28°41′50″N 57°59′33″E
- Country: Iran
- Province: Kerman
- County: Jiroft
- Bakhsh: Jebalbarez
- Rural District: Rezvan

Population (2006)
  - Total: 33
- Time zone: UTC+3:30 (IRST)
  - Summer (DST): UTC+4:30 (IRDT)

Parparuiyeh (Persian: پارپاروئيه, also Romanized as Pārpārū’īyeh) is a village in Rezvan Rural District, Jebalbarez District, Jiroft County, Kerman Province, Iran. At the 2006 census, its population was 33, in 11 families.
