= Qaleh Rigi =

Qaleh Rigi قلعه ريگي
- Village
- Location within Iran
- Coordinates: 28°57′04″N 57°24′10″E
- Country: Iran
- Province: Kerman
- County: Jiroft
- Bakhsh: Sarduiyeh
- Rural District: Sarduiyeh

Population (2006)
  - Total: 173
- Time zone: UTC+3:30 (IRST)
  - Summer (DST): UTC+4:30 (IRDT)

Qaleh Rigi (Persian: قلعه ريگي, also Romanized as Qal‘eh Rīgī) is a village in Sarduiyeh Rural District, Sarduiyeh District, Jiroft County, Kerman Province, Iran. At the 2006 census, its population was 173, in 32 families.
