= Afraz =

Afraz افراز
- Village
- Location within Iran
- Coordinates: 28°56′43″N 57°53′52″E
- Country: Iran
- Province: Kerman
- County: Jiroft
- Bakhsh: Jebalbarez
- Rural District: Maskun

Population (2006)
  - Total: 135
- Time zone: UTC+3:30 (IRST)
  - Summer (DST): UTC+4:30 (IRDT)

Afraz (Persian: افراز, also Romanized as Afrāz; also known as Afrār) is a village in Maskun Rural District, Jebalbarez District, Jiroft County, Kerman Province, Iran. At the 2006 census, its population was 135, in 34 families.
