= Shah Deraz =

Shah Deraz شه دراز
- Village
- Country: Iran
- Province: Kerman
- County: Jiroft
- Bakhsh: Jebalbarez
- Rural District: Saghder

Population (2006)
  - Total: 105
- Time zone: UTC+3:30 (IRST)
  - Summer (DST): UTC+4:30 (IRDT)

Shah Deraz (Persian: شه دراز, also Romanized as Shah Derāz) is a village in Saghder Rural District, Jebalbarez District, Jiroft County, Kerman Province, Iran. At the 2006 census, its population was 105, in 24 families.
