= Gurit =

Gurit گوريت
- Village
- Location within Iran
- Coordinates: 28°48′50″N 57°52′04″E
- Country: Iran
- Province: Kerman
- County: Jiroft
- Bakhsh: Jebalbarez
- Rural District: Saghder

Population (2006)
  - Total: 12
- Time zone: UTC+3:30 (IRST)
  - Summer (DST): UTC+4:30 (IRDT)

Gurit (Persian: گوريت, also Romanized as Gūrīt and Gūryat; also known as Goorkat and Gūrkat) is a village in Saghder Rural District, Jebalbarez District, Jiroft County, Kerman Province, Iran. At the 2006 census, its population was 12, in 4 families.
