= Deh-e Do Mand =

Deh-e Do Mand ده دومند
- Village
- Location within Iran
- Coordinates: 29°03′00″N 57°51′22″E
- Country: Iran
- Province: Kerman
- County: Jiroft
- Bakhsh: Sarduiyeh
- Rural District: Gevar

Population (2006)
  - Total: 141
- Time zone: UTC+3:30 (IRST)
  - Summer (DST): UTC+4:30 (IRDT)

Deh-e Do Mand (Persian: ده دومند; also known as Do Mand and Dowmand) is a village in Gevar Rural District, Sarduiyeh District, Jiroft County, Kerman Province, Iran. At the 2006 census, its population was 141, in 30 families.
