= Qanat-e Saman =

Qanat-e Saman قناتسامان
- Village
- Location within Iran
- Coordinates: 29°13′40″N 57°19′38″E
- Country: Iran
- Province: Kerman
- County: Jiroft
- Bakhsh: Sarduiyeh
- Rural District: Sarduiyeh

Population (2006)
  - Total: 396
- Time zone: UTC+3:30 (IRST)
  - Summer (DST): UTC+4:30 (IRDT)

Qanat-e Saman (Persian: قناتسامان, also Romanized as Qanāt-e Sāmān) is a village in Sarduiyeh Rural District, Sarduiyeh District, Jiroft County, Kerman Province, Iran. At the 2006 census, its population was 396, in 46 families.
