= Saghari =

Saghari ساغري
- Village
- Location within Iran
- Coordinates: 28°34′10″N 57°48′48″E
- Country: Iran
- Province: Kerman
- County: Jiroft
- Bakhsh: Central
- Rural District: Dowlatabad

Population (2006)
  - Total: 1,372
- Time zone: UTC+3:30 (IRST)
  - Summer (DST): UTC+4:30 (IRDT)

Saghari (Persian: ساغري, also Romanized as Sāgharī and Sāgherī) is a village in Dowlatabad Rural District, in the Central District of Jiroft County, Kerman Province, Iran. At the 2006 census, its population was 1,372, in 277 families.
