= Chineh Hukerd =

Chineh Hukerd چينه هوكرد
- Village
- Country: Iran
- Province: Kerman
- County: Jiroft
- Bakhsh: Central
- Rural District: Khatunabad

Population (2006)
  - Total: 182
- Time zone: UTC+3:30 (IRST)
  - Summer (DST): UTC+4:30 (IRDT)

Chineh Hukerd (Persian: چينه هوكرد, also Romanized as Chīneh Hūkerd) is a village in Khatunabad Rural District, in the Central District of Jiroft County, Kerman Province, Iran. At the 2006 census, its population was 182, in 39 families.
