= Akhorak =

Akhorak اخرك
- Village
- Location within Iran
- Coordinates: 29°19′58″N 57°17′43″E
- Country: Iran
- Province: Kerman
- County: Jiroft
- Bakhsh: Sarduiyeh
- Rural District: Sarduiyeh

Population (2006)
  - Total: 131
- Time zone: UTC+3:30 (IRST)
  - Summer (DST): UTC+4:30 (IRDT)

Akhorak (Persian: اخرك, also Romanized as Ākhorak; also known as Ākhūrak) is a village in Sarduiyeh Rural District, Sarduiyeh District, Jiroft County, Kerman Province, Iran. At the 2006 census, its population was 131, in 34 families.
