= Shesh Tak =

Shesh Tak ششتك
- Village
- Location within Iran
- Coordinates: 29°24′43″N 57°22′31″E
- Country: Iran
- Province: Kerman
- County: Jiroft
- Bakhsh: Sarduiyeh
- Rural District: Dalfard

Population (2006)
  - Total: 64
- Time zone: UTC+3:30 (IRST)
  - Summer (DST): UTC+4:30 (IRDT)

Shesh Tak (Persian: ششتك) is a village in Dalfard Rural District, Sarduiyeh District, Jiroft County, Kerman Province, Iran. At the 2006 census, its population was 64, in 13 families.
