= Khorramshahi =

Khorramshahi خرمشاهی
- Village
- Location within Iran
- Coordinates: 28°57′59″N 57°38′38″E
- Country: Iran
- Province: Kerman
- County: Jiroft
- Bakhsh: Sarduiyeh
- Rural District: Dalfard

Population (2006)
  - Total: 61
- Time zone: UTC+3:30 (IRST)
  - Summer (DST): UTC+4:30 (IRDT)

Khorramshahi (Persian: خرمشاهی, also Romanized as Khorramshāhī) is a village in Dalfard Rural District, Sarduiyeh District, Jiroft County, Kerman Province, Iran. At the 2006 census, its population was 61, in 15 families.
