= Khukestan =

Khukestan خوكستان
- Village
- Location within Iran
- Coordinates: 29°08′40″N 57°29′38″E
- Country: Iran
- Province: Kerman
- County: Jiroft
- Bakhsh: Sarduiyeh
- Rural District: Gevar

Population (2006)
  - Total: 165
- Time zone: UTC+3:30 (IRST)
  - Summer (DST): UTC+4:30 (IRDT)

Khukestan (Persian: خوكستان, also Romanized as Khūkestān; also known as Khūbestān) is a village in Gevar Rural District, Sarduiyeh District, Jiroft County, Kerman Province, Iran. At the 2006 census, its population was 165, in 34 families.
