= Sar Muran =

Sar Muran سرموران
- Village
- Location within Iran
- Coordinates: 28°56′54″N 57°53′31″E
- Country: Iran
- Province: Kerman
- County: Jiroft
- Bakhsh: Jebalbarez
- Rural District: Maskun

Population (2006)
  - Total: 22
- Time zone: UTC+3:30 (IRST)
  - Summer (DST): UTC+4:30 (IRDT)

Sar Muran (Persian: سرموران, also Romanized as Sar Mūrān; also known as Sar Mārān) is a village in Maskun Rural District, Jebalbarez District, Jiroft County, Kerman Province, Iran. At the 2006 census, its population was 22, in 5 families.
