= Dehkaran =

Dehkaran ده كران
- Village
- Location within Iran
- Coordinates: 28°40′16″N 57°48′22″E
- Country: Iran
- Province: Kerman
- County: Jiroft
- Bakhsh: Central
- Rural District: Dowlatabad

Population (2006)
  - Total: 23
- Time zone: UTC+3:30 (IRST)
  - Summer (DST): UTC+4:30 (IRDT)

Dehkaran (Persian: ده كران, also Romanized as Dehkarān and Deh Karān; also known as Dehgarān) is a village in Dowlatabad Rural District, in the Central District of Jiroft County, Kerman Province, Iran. At the 2006 census, its population was 23, in 5 families.
