= Pol-e Piran =

Pol-e Piran پل پيران
- Village
- Location within Iran
- Coordinates: 29°11′28″N 57°23′24″E
- Country: Iran
- Province: Kerman
- County: Jiroft
- Bakhsh: Sarduiyeh
- Rural District: Sarduiyeh

Population (2006)
  - Total: 351
- Time zone: UTC+3:30 (IRST)
  - Summer (DST): UTC+4:30 (IRDT)

Pol-e Piran (Persian: پل پيران, also Romanized as Pol-e Pīrān and Pol Pīrān; also known as Pol Biran, Pol-e Parān, and Pulpirān) is a village in Sarduiyeh Rural District, Sarduiyeh District, Jiroft County, Kerman Province, Iran. At the 2006 census, its population was 351, in 61 families.
