= Tuderk =

Tuderk تودرك
- Village
- Location within Iran
- Coordinates: 28°54′06″N 57°54′01″E
- Country: Iran
- Province: Kerman
- County: Jiroft
- Bakhsh: Jebalbarez
- Rural District: Maskun

Population (2006)
  - Total: 32
- Time zone: UTC+3:30 (IRST)
  - Summer (DST): UTC+4:30 (IRDT)

Tuderk (Persian: تودرك, also Romanized as Tūderk) is a village in Maskun Rural District, Jebalbarez District, Jiroft County, Kerman Province, Iran. At the 2006 census, its population was 32, in 8 families.
