= Bar Avard Shodeh =

Bar Avard Shodeh براوردشده
- Village
- Location within Iran
- Coordinates: 28°58′42″N 57°24′40″E
- Country: Iran
- Province: Kerman
- County: Jiroft
- Bakhsh: Sarduiyeh
- Rural District: Sarduiyeh

Population (2006)
  - Total: 177
- Time zone: UTC+3:30 (IRST)
  - Summer (DST): UTC+4:30 (IRDT)

Bar Avard Shodeh (Persian: براوردشده, also Romanized as Bar Āvard Shodeh) is a village in Sarduiyeh Rural District, Sarduiyeh District, Jiroft County, Kerman Province, Iran. At the 2006 census, its population was 177, with 35 families.
