= Kal Khargushi =

Kal Khargushi كل خرگوشي
- Village
- Location within Iran
- Coordinates: 28°39′58″N 57°01′32″E
- Country: Iran
- Province: Kerman
- County: Jiroft
- Bakhsh: Central
- Rural District: Esfandaqeh

Population (2006)
  - Total: 32
- Time zone: UTC+3:30 (IRST)
  - Summer (DST): UTC+4:30 (IRDT)

Kal Khargushi (Persian: كل خرگوشي, also Romanized as Kal Khargūshī; also known as Golkhargūsh, Golkhargūshū, and Kal Khargūshū) is a village in Esfandaqeh Rural District, in the Central District of Jiroft County, Kerman Province, Iran. At the 2006 census, its population was 32, in 7 families.
