= Emamzadeh Seyyed Hoseyn Kornag =

Emamzadeh Seyyed Hoseyn Kornag امامزاده سيدحسين كرنگ
- Village
- Country: Iran
- Province: Kerman
- County: Jiroft
- Bakhsh: Sarduiyeh
- Rural District: Sarduiyeh

Population (2006)
  - Total: 32
- Time zone: UTC+3:30 (IRST)
  - Summer (DST): UTC+4:30 (IRDT)

Emamzadeh Seyyed Hoseyn Kornag (Persian: امامزاده سيدحسين كرنگ, also Romanized as Emāmzādeh Seyyed Ḩoseyn Kornag) is a village in Sarduiyeh Rural District, Sarduiyeh District, Jiroft County, Kerman Province, Iran. At the 2006 census, its population was 32, in 6 families.
