= Bab Nem =

Bab Nem باب نم
- Village
- Location within Iran
- Coordinates: 29°09′50″N 57°23′03″E
- Country: Iran
- Province: Kerman
- County: Jiroft
- Bakhsh: Sarduiyeh
- Rural District: Sarduiyeh

Population (2006)
  - Total: 335
- Time zone: UTC+3:30 (IRST)
  - Summer (DST): UTC+4:30 (IRDT)

Bab Nem (Persian: باب نم, also romanized as Bāb Nem and Bāb Nam) is a village in Sarduiyeh Rural District, Sarduiyeh District, Jiroft County, Kerman Province, Iran. At the 2006 census, its population was 335, in 67 families.
