= Kal Kuhi =

Kal Kuhi كلكوهي
- Village
- Location within Iran
- Coordinates: 28°47′57″N 57°56′41″E
- Country: Iran
- Province: Kerman
- County: Jiroft
- Bakhsh: Jebalbarez
- Rural District: Saghder

Population (2006)
  - Total: 11
- Time zone: UTC+3:30 (IRST)
  - Summer (DST): UTC+4:30 (IRDT)

Kal Kuhi (Persian: كلكوهي, also Romanized as Kal Kūhī) is a village in Saghder Rural District, Jebalbarez District, Jiroft County, Kerman Province, Iran. At the 2006 census, its population was 11, in 4 families.
