= Boneh-ye Zangar =

Village in Kerman, Iran

Boneh-ye Zangar بنه زنگار
- Village
- Location within Iran
- Coordinates: 28°35′38″N 56°59′43″E
- Country: Iran
- Province: Kerman
- County: Jiroft
- Bakhsh: Central
- Rural District: Esfandaqeh

Population (2006)
  - Total: 25
- Time zone: UTC+3:30 (IRST)
  - Summer (DST): UTC+4:30 (IRDT)

Boneh-ye Zangar (Persian: بنه زنگار, also Romanized as Boneh-ye Zangār) is a village in Esfandaqeh Rural District, in the Central District of Jiroft County, Kerman Province, Iran. At the 2006 census, its population was 25, in 8 families.
