= Pidafak =

Pidafak پيدافك
- Village
- Location within Iran
- Coordinates: 28°39′14″N 57°58′38″E
- Country: Iran
- Province: Kerman
- County: Jiroft
- Bakhsh: Jebalbarez
- Rural District: Rezvan

Population (2006)
  - Total: 86
- Time zone: UTC+3:30 (IRST)
  - Summer (DST): UTC+4:30 (IRDT)

Pidafak (Persian: پيدافك, also Romanized as Pīdāfak) is a village in Rezvan Rural District, Jebalbarez District, Jiroft County, Kerman Province, Iran. At the 2006 census, its population was 86, in 18 families.
