= Pain Darb-e Pain =

Pain Darb-e Pain پائين درب پائين
- Village
- Location within Iran
- Coordinates: 29°09′28″N 57°27′17″E
- Country: Iran
- Province: Kerman
- County: Jiroft
- Bakhsh: Sarduiyeh
- Rural District: Gevar

Population (2006)
  - Total: 112
- Time zone: UTC+3:30 (IRST)
  - Summer (DST): UTC+4:30 (IRDT)

Pain Darb-e Pain (Persian: پائين درب پائين, also Romanized as Pā’īn Darb-e Pā’īn; also known as Pā Nahr-e Pā’īn and Pāyandarb-e Soflá) is a village in Gevar Rural District, Sarduiyeh District, Jiroft County, Kerman Province, Iran. At the 2006 census, its population was 112, in 21 families.
