= Sheyb-e Nasri =

Sheyb-e Nasri شيب ناصري
- Village
- Country: Iran
- Province: Kerman
- County: Jiroft
- Bakhsh: Sarduiyeh
- Rural District: Sarduiyeh

Population (2006)
  - Total: 247
- Time zone: UTC+3:30 (IRST)
  - Summer (DST): UTC+4:30 (IRDT)

Sheyb-e Nasri (Persian: شيب ناصري, also Romanized as Sheyb-e Nāṣrī) is a village in Sarduiyeh Rural District, Sarduiyeh District, Jiroft County, Kerman Province, Iran. At the 2006 census, its population was 247, in 41 families.
