= Deh Vali =

Deh Vali ده والي
- Village
- Location within Iran
- Coordinates: 29°11′45″N 57°19′33″E
- Country: Iran
- Province: Kerman
- County: Jiroft
- Bakhsh: Sarduiyeh
- Rural District: Sarduiyeh

Population (2006)
  - Total: 127
- Time zone: UTC+3:30 (IRST)
  - Summer (DST): UTC+4:30 (IRDT)

Deh Vali (Persian: ده والي, also Romanized as Deh Vālī) is a village in Sarduiyeh Rural District, Sarduiyeh District, Jiroft County, Kerman Province, Iran. At the 2006 census, its population was 127, in 21 families.
