= Bab Mishan-e Bala =

Bab Mishan-e Bala باب ميشان بالا
- Village
- Country: Iran
- Province: Kerman
- County: Jiroft
- Bakhsh: Sarduiyeh
- Rural District: Sarduiyeh

Population (2006)
  - Total: 146
- Time zone: UTC+3:30 (IRST)
  - Summer (DST): UTC+4:30 (IRDT)

Bab Mishan-e Bala (Persian: باب ميشان بالا, also Romanized as Bāb Mīshān-e Bālā) is a village in Sarduiyeh Rural District, Sarduiyeh District, Jiroft County, Kerman Province, Iran. At the 2006 census, its population was 146, in 33 families.
