= Dowkestan =

Dowkestan دوكستان
- Village
- Location within Iran
- Coordinates: 29°11′34″N 57°41′43″E
- Country: Iran
- Province: Kerman
- County: Jiroft
- Bakhsh: Sarduiyeh
- Rural District: Gevar

Population (2006)
  - Total: 91
- Time zone: UTC+3:30 (IRST)
  - Summer (DST): UTC+4:30 (IRDT)

Dowkestan (Persian: دوكستان, also Romanized as Dowkestān and Dūkestān) is a village in Gevar Rural District, Sarduiyeh District, Jiroft County, Kerman Province, Iran. At the 2006 census, its population was 91, in 20 families.
