= Qarqatuiyeh =

Qarqatuiyeh قرقطوئيه
- Village
- Location within Iran
- Coordinates: 28°54′12″N 57°05′07″E
- Country: Iran
- Province: Kerman
- County: Jiroft
- Bakhsh: Central
- Rural District: Esfandaqeh

Population (2006)
  - Total: 199
- Time zone: UTC+3:30 (IRST)
  - Summer (DST): UTC+4:30 (IRDT)

Qarqatuiyeh (Persian: قرقطوئيه, also Romanized as Qarqatū’īyeh; also known as Gharghtoo’iyeh, Qargatū’īyeh, and Qarghaţū’īyeh) is a village in Esfandaqeh Rural District, in the Central District of Jiroft County, Kerman Province, Iran. At the 2006 census, its population was 199, in 45 families.
