= Kar Chiska =

Kar Chiska كرچيسكا
- Village
- Location within Iran
- Coordinates: 28°52′39″N 57°50′19″E
- Country: Iran
- Province: Kerman
- County: Jiroft
- Bakhsh: Jebalbarez
- Rural District: Saghder

Population (2006)
  - Total: 106
- Time zone: UTC+3:30 (IRST)
  - Summer (DST): UTC+4:30 (IRDT)

Kar Chiska (Persian: كرچيسكا, also Romanized as Kar Chīskā; also known as Gohrej-e Bālā and Kal Chīskā) is a village in Saghder Rural District, Jebalbarez District, Jiroft County, Kerman Province, Iran. At the 2006 census, its population was 106, in 21 families.
