= Avres Morad =

Avres Morad اورس مراد
- Village
- Location within Iran
- Coordinates: 29°06′33″N 57°31′34″E
- Country: Iran
- Province: Kerman
- County: Jiroft
- Bakhsh: Sarduiyeh
- Rural District: Gevar

Population (2006)
  - Total: 96
- Time zone: UTC+3:30 (IRST)
  - Summer (DST): UTC+4:30 (IRDT)

Avres Morad (Persian: اورس مراد, also Romanized as Āvres Morād; also known as Ābres va Morād) is a village in Gevar Rural District, Sarduiyeh District, Jiroft County, Kerman Province, Iran. At the 2006 census, its population was 96, in 19 families.
