= Posht Sorkh =

Posht Sorkh پشت سرخ
- Village
- Location within Iran
- Coordinates: 28°57′07″N 57°39′11″E
- Country: Iran
- Province: Kerman
- County: Jiroft
- Bakhsh: Sarduiyeh
- Rural District: Dalfard

Population (2006)
  - Total: 97
- Time zone: UTC+3:30 (IRST)
  - Summer (DST): UTC+4:30 (IRDT)

Posht Sorkh (Persian: پشت سرخ, also Romanized as Posht-e Sorkh) is a village in Dalfard Rural District, Sarduiyeh District, Jiroft County, Kerman Province, Iran. At the 2006 census, its population was 97, in 18 families.
