= Bid Zagh =

Bid Zagh بيدزاغ
- Village
- Location within Iran
- Coordinates: 29°13′00″N 57°38′19″E
- Country: Iran
- Province: Kerman
- County: Jiroft
- Bakhsh: Sarduiyeh
- Rural District: Gevar

Population (2006)
  - Total: 29
- Time zone: UTC+3:30 (IRST)
  - Summer (DST): UTC+4:30 (IRDT)

Bid Zagh (Persian: بيدزاغ, also Romanized as Bīd Zāgh) is a village in Gevar Rural District, Sarduiyeh District, Jiroft County, Kerman Province, Iran. At the 2006 census, its population was 29, in 7 families.
