= Jowkar =

Jowkar or Javakar (Persian: جوكار) may refer to:

- Jowkar, Afghanistan, a village
- Jowkar, Iran, a city
- Jowkar-e Mehdi, a village in Kerman Province
- Jowkar-e Shafi, a village in Kerman Province
- Jowkar, Dehdez, a village in Izeh County, Khuzestan Province
- Jowkar, Susan, a village in Izeh County, Khuzestan Province
- Jowkar, Kohgiluyeh and Boyer-Ahmad, a village
- Jowkar, Lorestan, a village
- Jowkar District, in Iran
- Jowkar Rural District, in Iran
