= Sefteh =

Sefteh (Persian: سفته) may refer to:

- Sefteh, Bezenjan, a village in Baft County
- Sefteh, Fathabad, a village in Baft County
- Sefteh, Khabar, a village in Baft County
- Sefteh, Bardsir
- Sefteh, Golzar, a village in Bardsir County
