= Bezenjan =

City in Kerman province, Iran

Bezenjan Persian: بزنجان
- City
- Location within Iran
- Coordinates: 29°15′03″N 56°41′57″E
- Country: Iran
- Province: Kerman
- County: Baft
- District: Central

Population (2016)
  - Total: 4,517
- Time zone: UTC+3:30 (IRST)

Bezenjan (Persian: بزنجان) (Note: Also romanized as Bezenjān; also known as Bezenjānī, Bīzenjān, Bizinjān, and Now Bezenjān) is a city in the Central District of Baft County, Kerman province, Iran, serving as the administrative center for Bezenjan Rural District.

== Demographics ==
=== Population ===
At the time of the 2006 National Census, the city population was 4,417 in 1,112 households. The following census in 2011 counted 4,034 people in 1,129 households. The 2016 census measured the population of the city as 4,517 people in 1,444 households.

== Geography ==
Bezenjan is a mountainous city and one of the highest cities in Iran. It has a rich historical background in Baft County, Kerman province (the largest province of Iran). The distance to the city of Baft is 8km and 151km to the Kerman metropolis. The city is bounded on the north by Kiskan Rural District, on the east by Rabor and Javaran Rural Districts, on the south and southwest by Dashtab Rural District, and on the west by Dashtab and Fathabad Rural Districts.

== History ==
It is possible that the city dates back to ancient times and early fifth century BC. Therefore, Bezenjan is one of the areas with an ancient history. The people of this city have the closest genetic closeness with the eastern Aryans of Iran and are of Aryan descent who entered these areas from the east. First, Amirkabir, Tehran, 1989, p. 248) (Geography of Kerman, p. 248) (Historical geography of Baft and Rabar, 1390, p. 63)

Development of Bezenjan started years ago, when Mohamad Naseri instituted the first school there.
