= Aliabad, Baft =

Village in Kerman province, Iran

Aliabad Persian: علي اباد
- Village
- Location within Iran
- Coordinates: 28°57′36″N 56°33′00″E
- Country: Iran
- Province: Kerman
- County: Baft
- District: Khabar
- Rural District: Dashtab

Population (2016)
  - Total: 0
- Time zone: UTC+3:30 (IRST)

Aliabad (Persian: علي اباد) (Note: Also romanized as ‘Alīābād) is a village in Dashtab Rural District of Khabar District, Baft County, Kerman province, Iran.

== Demographics ==
=== Population ===
At the time of the 2006 National Census, the village's population was 184 in 33 households, when it was in the Central District. The village did not appear in the following census of 2011, by which time the rural district had been separated from the district in the establishment of Khabar District. The 2016 census measured the population of the village as zero.
