= Zar Dasht =

Zar Dasht زردشت
- Village
- Location within Iran
- Coordinates: 29°18′58″N 56°23′33″E
- Country: Iran
- Province: Kerman
- County: Baft
- Bakhsh: Central
- Rural District: Fathabad

Population (2006)
  - Total: 318
- Time zone: UTC+3:30 (IRST)
  - Summer (DST): UTC+4:30 (IRDT)

Zar Dasht (Persian: زردشت) is a village in Fathabad Rural District, in the Central District of Baft County, Kerman Province, Iran. At the 2006 census, its population was 318, in 72 families.
