= Qanat Marvan =

Qanat Marvan قنات مروان
- Village
- Location within Iran
- Coordinates: 29°20′19″N 56°46′12″E
- Country: Iran
- Province: Kerman
- County: Baft
- Bakhsh: Central
- Rural District: Bezenjan

Population (2006)
  - Total: 18
- Time zone: UTC+3:30 (IRST)
  - Summer (DST): UTC+4:30 (IRDT)

Qanat Marvan (Persian: قنات مروان, also Romanized as Qanāt Marvān, Qanāt-e Marvān, and Qanāt-e Mervān; also known as Ma'dan-e Qanāt Marvān) is a village in Bezenjan Rural District, in the Central District of Baft County, Kerman Province, Iran. At the 2006 census, its population was 18, in 9 families.
