= Galleh Baghan =

Galleh Baghan گله باغان
- Village
- Country: Iran
- Province: Kerman
- County: Baft
- Bakhsh: Central
- Rural District: Gughar

Population (2006)
  - Total: 43
- Time zone: UTC+3:30 (IRST)
  - Summer (DST): UTC+4:30 (IRDT)

Galleh Baghan (Persian: گله باغان, also Romanized as Galleh Bāghān) is a village in Gughar Rural District, in the Central District of Baft County, Kerman Province, Iran. At the 2006 census, its population was 43, in 14 families.
