= Bustan, Kerman =

Bustan بوستان
- Village
- Location within Iran
- Coordinates: 29°23′47″N 56°37′08″E
- Country: Iran
- Province: Kerman
- County: Baft
- Bakhsh: Central
- Rural District: Kiskan

Population (2006)
  - Total: 28
- Time zone: UTC+3:30 (IRST)
  - Summer (DST): UTC+4:30 (IRDT)

Bustan (Persian: بوستان, also Romanized as Būstān) is a village in Kiskan Rural District, in the Central District of Baft County, Kerman Province, Iran. At the 2006 census, its population was 28, in 12 families.
