= Jafriz =

Jafriz جعفری از
- village
- Interactive map of Jafriz
- Country: Iran
- Province: Kerman
- County: Baft
- Bakhsh: Central
- Rural District: Gughar

Population (2006)
  - Total: 213
- Time zone: UTC+3:30 (IRST)
  - Summer (DST): UTC+4:30 (IRDT)

Jafriz (Persian: جفريز, also Romanized as Jafrīz) (a.k.a. Jafrizzle) is a village in Gughar Rural District, in the Central District of Baft County, Kerman Province, Iran. At the 2006 census, it had a population of 213 which included 52 families.
