= Mursaruiyeh =

Mursaruiyeh مورساروييه
- Village
- Location within Iran
- Coordinates: 29°11′00″N 56°36′53″E
- Country: Iran
- Province: Kerman
- County: Baft
- Bakhsh: Central
- Rural District: Bezenjan

Population (2006)
  - Total: 42
- Time zone: UTC+3:30 (IRST)
  - Summer (DST): UTC+4:30 (IRDT)

Mursaruiyeh (Persian: مورساروييه, also Romanized as Mūrsārū’īyeh; also known as Marsārū’īyeh and Morsārū’īyeh) is a village in Bezenjan Rural District, in the Central District of Baft County, Kerman Province, Iran. At the 2006 census, its population was 42, in 11 families.
