= Chahar Kahn =

Chahar Kahn چهاركهن
- Village
- Location within Iran
- Coordinates: 29°13′49″N 56°17′12″E
- Country: Iran
- Province: Kerman
- County: Baft
- Bakhsh: Central
- Rural District: Fathabad

Population (2006)
  - Total: 48
- Time zone: UTC+3:30 (IRST)
  - Summer (DST): UTC+4:30 (IRDT)

Chahar Kahn (Persian: چهاركهن, also Romanized as Chahār Kahn; also known as Chahār Kan) is a village in Fathabad Rural District, in the Central District of Baft County, Kerman Province, Iran. At the 2006 census, its population was 48, in 8 families.
