= Bagh-e Fakhruiyeh =

Bagh-e Fakhruiyeh باغ فخروييه
- Village
- Location within Iran
- Coordinates: 29°20′46″N 56°42′57″E
- Country: Iran
- Province: Kerman
- County: Baft
- Bakhsh: Central
- Rural District: Bezenjan

Population (2006)
  - Total: 292
- Time zone: UTC+3:30 (IRST)
  - Summer (DST): UTC+4:30 (IRDT)

Bagh-e Fakhruiyeh (Persian: باغ فخروييه, also Romanized as Bāgh-e Fakhrū’īyeh, Bāgh Fakhrū’īyeh, and Bāgh Fakhrūyeh) is a village in Bezenjan Rural District, in the Central District of Baft County, Kerman Province, Iran. At the 2006 census, its population was 292, in 60 families.
