= Ab Nai =

Ab Nai ابناي
- Village
- Location within Iran
- Coordinates: 29°23′00″N 56°38′00″E
- Country: Iran
- Province: Kerman
- County: Baft
- Bakhsh: Central
- Rural District: Kiskan

Population (2006)
  - Total: 31
- Time zone: UTC+3:30 (IRST)
  - Summer (DST): UTC+4:30 (IRDT)

Ab Nai (Persian: ابناي, also Romanized as Āb Nā’ī) is a village in Kiskan Rural District, in the Central District of Baft County, Kerman province, Iran. At the 2006 census, its population was 31, in 7 families.
