= Modravan =

Modravan مدروان
- Village
- Location within Iran
- Coordinates: 29°15′31″N 56°45′49″E
- Country: Iran
- Province: Kerman
- County: Baft
- Bakhsh: Central
- Rural District: Bezenjan

Population (2006)
  - Total: 371
- Time zone: UTC+3:30 (IRST)
  - Summer (DST): UTC+4:30 (IRDT)

Modravan (Persian: مدروان, also romanized as Modravān and Madarvān; also known as Madardān) is a village in Bezenjan Rural District, in the Central District of Baft County, Kerman Province, Iran. At the 2006 census its population was 371, in 75 families.
