= Choghar Chuiyeh =

Choghar Chuiyeh چغارچوئيه
- Village
- Location within Iran
- Coordinates: 29°16′14″N 56°45′26″E
- Country: Iran
- Province: Kerman
- County: Baft
- Bakhsh: Central
- Rural District: Bezenjan

Population (2006)
  - Total: 576
- Time zone: UTC+3:30 (IRST)
  - Summer (DST): UTC+4:30 (IRDT)

Choghar Chuiyeh (Persian: چغارچوئيه, also Romanized as Choghār Chū’īyeh; also known as Chagharchūn, Choghāchū’īyeh, Choghār Chūn, and Jagharchūn) is a village in Bezenjan Rural District, in the Central District of Baft County, Kerman province, Iran. At the 2006 census, its population was 576, in 119 families.
