= Gomtuiyeh =

Gomtuiyeh گمتوييه
- Village
- Location within Iran
- Coordinates: 29°08′44″N 56°45′59″E
- Country: Iran
- Province: Kerman
- County: Baft
- Bakhsh: Central
- Rural District: Bezenjan

Population (2006)
  - Total: 29
- Time zone: UTC+3:30 (IRST)
  - Summer (DST): UTC+4:30 (IRDT)

Gomtuiyeh (Persian: گمتوييه, also Romanized as Gomtū’īyeh; also known as Gombatū’īyeh and Gonbatū’īyeh) is a village in Bezenjan Rural District, in the Central District of Baft County, Kerman Province, Iran. At the 2006 census, its population was 29, in 10 families.
