= Shurbaz-e Olya =

Shurbaz-e Olya شوربازعليا
- Village
- Location within Iran
- Coordinates: 29°11′56″N 56°39′53″E
- Country: Iran
- Province: Kerman
- County: Baft
- Bakhsh: Central
- Rural District: Bezenjan

Population (2006)
  - Total: 266
- Time zone: UTC+3:30 (IRST)
  - Summer (DST): UTC+4:30 (IRDT)

Shurbaz-e Olya (Persian: شوربازعليا, also Romanized as Shūrbāz-e ‘Olyā; also known as Shūrbāz) is a village in Bezenjan Rural District, in the Central District of Baft County, Kerman Province, Iran. At the 2006 census, its population was 266, in 59 families.
