= Bezang-e Hajjiabad =

Bezang-e Hajjiabad بزنگ حاجي اباد
- Village
- Location within Iran
- Coordinates: 29°29′28″N 56°24′57″E
- Country: Iran
- Province: Kerman
- County: Baft
- Bakhsh: Central
- Rural District: Gughar

Population (2006)
  - Total: 22
- Time zone: UTC+3:30 (IRST)
  - Summer (DST): UTC+4:30 (IRDT)

Bezang-e Hajjiabad (Persian: بزنگ حاجي اباد, also Romanized as Bezang-e Ḩājjīābād; also known as Bezang) is a village in Gughar Rural District, in the Central District of Baft County, Kerman Province, Iran. At the 2006 census, its population was 22, in 5 families.
