= Khabar, Baft =

Village in Kerman province, Iran

Khabar Persian: خبر
- Village
- Location within Iran
- Coordinates: 28°49′05″N 56°19′22″E
- Country: Iran
- Province: Kerman
- County: Baft
- District: Khabar
- Rural District: Khabar

Population (2016)
  - Total: 2,634
- Time zone: UTC+3:30 (IRST)

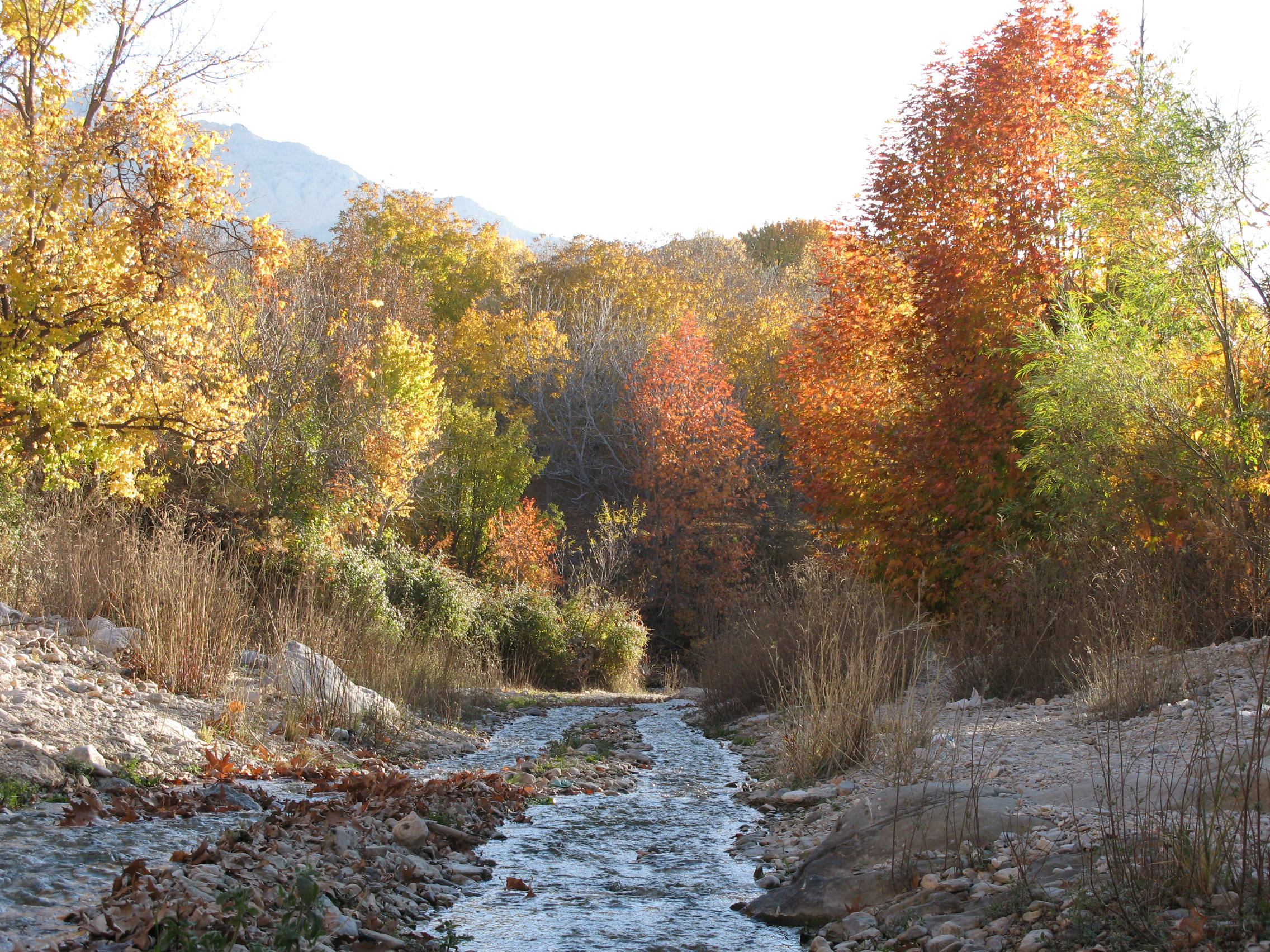

Khabar (Persian: خبر) (Note: Also romanized as Khabr) is a village in, and the capital of, Khabar Rural District of Khabar District, Baft County, Kerman province, Iran.

== Demographics ==
=== Population ===
At the time of the 2006 National Census, the village's population was 1,685 in 387 households, when it was in the Central District. The following census in 2011 counted 3,174 people in 919 households. by which time the rural district had been separated from the district in the establishment of Khabar District. The 2016 census measured the population of the village as 2,634 people in 826 households. It was the most populous village in its rural district.
