= Ahmad Khani, Iran =

Ahmad Khani احمدخاني
- Village
- Location within Iran
- Coordinates: 28°49′43″N 56°16′38″E
- Country: Iran
- Province: Kerman
- County: Baft
- Bakhsh: Central
- Rural District: Khabar

Population (2006)
  - Total: 83
- Time zone: UTC+3:30 (IRST)
  - Summer (DST): UTC+4:30 (IRDT)

Ahmad Khani (Persian: احمدخاني, also Romanized as Aḩmad Khānī) is a village in Khabar Rural District, in the Central District of Baft County, Kerman Province, Iran. At the 2006 census, its population was 83, in 20 families.
