= Boriduiyeh =

Boriduiyeh بريدوييه
- Village
- Location within Iran
- Coordinates: 28°59′32″N 56°36′58″E
- Country: Iran
- Province: Kerman
- County: Baft
- Bakhsh: Central
- Rural District: Dashtab

Population (2006)
  - Total: 250
- Time zone: UTC+3:30 (IRST)
  - Summer (DST): UTC+4:30 (IRDT)

Boriduiyeh (Persian: بريدوييه, also Romanized as Borīdū’īyeh, Barīdū’īyeh, and Beridoo’eyeh; also known as Barīdū and Borīdū’ Yeh) is a village in Dashtab Rural District, in the Central District of Baft County, Kerman Province, Iran. At the 2006 census, its population was 250, in 48 families.
