= Bayaz-e Bala =

Bayaz-e Bala بياض بالا
- Village
- Location within Iran
- Coordinates: 29°08′17″N 56°22′49″E
- Country: Iran
- Province: Kerman
- County: Baft
- Bakhsh: Central
- Rural District: Fathabad

Population (2006)
  - Total: 27
- Time zone: UTC+3:30 (IRST)
  - Summer (DST): UTC+4:30 (IRDT)

Bayaz-e Bala (Persian: بياض بالا, also Romanized as Bayāẕ-e Bālā; also known as Bayāẕ and Bīāẕ) is a village in Fathabad Rural District, in the Central District of Baft County, Kerman Province, Iran. At the 2006 census, its population was 27, in 8 families.
