= Henkayi =

Henkayi هنكائي
- Village
- Location within Iran
- Coordinates: 29°29′39″N 56°27′01″E
- Country: Iran
- Province: Kerman
- County: Baft
- Bakhsh: Central
- Rural District: Gughar

Population (2006)
  - Total: 96
- Time zone: UTC+3:30 (IRST)
  - Summer (DST): UTC+4:30 (IRDT)

Henkayi (Persian: هنكائي, also Romanized as Henkāyī; also known as Hengāee) is a village in Gughar Rural District, in the Central District of Baft County, Kerman Province, Iran. At the 2006 census, its population was 96, in 24 families.
