= Sarkhani =

Sarkhani سارخاني
- Village
- Location within Iran
- Coordinates: 28°50′01″N 56°17′14″E
- Country: Iran
- Province: Kerman
- County: Baft
- Bakhsh: Central
- Rural District: Khabar

Population (2006)
  - Total: 80
- Time zone: UTC+3:30 (IRST)
  - Summer (DST): UTC+4:30 (IRDT)

Sarkhani (Persian: سارخاني, also Romanized as Sārkhānī; also known as Sārīkhānī) is a village in Khabar Rural District, in the Central District of Baft County, Kerman Province, Iran. At the 2006 census, its population was 80, in 18 families.
