= Aren-e Sofla =

Aren-e Sofla ارن سفلي
- Village
- Location within Iran
- Coordinates: 29°13′55″N 56°42′23″E
- Country: Iran
- Province: Kerman
- County: Baft
- Bakhsh: Central
- Rural District: Bezenjan

Population (2006)
  - Total: 75
- Time zone: UTC+3:30 (IRST)
  - Summer (DST): UTC+4:30 (IRDT)

Aren-e Sofla (Persian: ارن سفلي, also Romanized as Āren-e Soflá; also known as Āren-e Pā’īn) is a village in Bezenjan Rural District, in the Central District of Baft County, Kerman Province, Iran. At the 2006 census, its population was 75, in 15 families.
