= Jowyiviyeh =

Jowyiviyeh جويوئيه
- Village
- Country: Iran
- Province: Kerman
- County: Baft
- Bakhsh: Central
- Rural District: Gughar

Population (2006)
  - Total: 45
- Time zone: UTC+3:30 (IRST)
  - Summer (DST): UTC+4:30 (IRDT)

Jowyiviyeh (Persian: جويوئيه, also Romanized as Jowyīvīyeh) is a village in Gughar Rural District, in the Central District of Baft County, Kerman Province, Iran. At the 2006 census, its population was 45, in 11 families.
