= Azerenjan =

Azerenjan اذرنجان
- Village
- Location within Iran
- Coordinates: 29°18′01″N 56°24′51″E
- Country: Iran
- Province: Kerman
- County: Baft
- Bakhsh: Central
- Rural District: Fathabad

Population (2006)
  - Total: 15
- Time zone: UTC+3:30 (IRST)
  - Summer (DST): UTC+4:30 (IRDT)

Azerenjan (Persian: اذرنجان, also Romanized as Āẕerenjān; also known as Āderenjān) is a village in Fathabad Rural District, in the Central District of Baft County, Kerman Province, Iran. At the 2006 census, its population was 15, in 5 families.
