= Posht Juiyieh =

Posht Juiyieh پشتجوييه
- Village
- Location within Iran
- Coordinates: 29°23′02″N 56°38′13″E
- Country: Iran
- Province: Kerman
- County: Baft
- Bakhsh: Central
- Rural District: Kiskan

Population (2006)
  - Total: 63
- Time zone: UTC+3:30 (IRST)
  - Summer (DST): UTC+4:30 (IRDT)

Posht Juiyieh (Persian: پشتجوييه, also Romanized as Posht Jūīyīeh; also known as Poshtjūeeyeh-ye Kiskan) is a village in Kiskan Rural District, in the Central District of Baft County, Kerman Province, Iran. At the 2006 census, its population was 63, in 18 families.
