= Dijuiyeh =

Dijuiyeh ديجوييه
- Village
- Location within Iran
- Coordinates: 29°30′37″N 56°25′49″E
- Country: Iran
- Province: Kerman
- County: Baft
- Bakhsh: Central
- Rural District: Gughar

Population (2006)
  - Total: 49
- Time zone: UTC+3:30 (IRST)
  - Summer (DST): UTC+4:30 (IRDT)

Dijuiyeh (Persian: ديجوييه, also Romanized as Dījūīyeh and Dījūeeyeh) is a village in Gughar Rural District, in the Central District of Baft County, Kerman Province, Iran. At the 2006 census, its population was 49, in 9 families.
