= Narkuiyeh =

Narkuiyeh ناركوئيه
- Village
- Country: Iran
- Province: Kerman
- County: Baft
- Bakhsh: Central
- Rural District: Khabar

Population (2006)
  - Total: 35
- Time zone: UTC+3:30 (IRST)
  - Summer (DST): UTC+4:30 (IRDT)

Narkuiyeh (Persian: ناركوئيه, also Romanized as Nārkū’īyeh) is a village in Khabar Rural District, in the Central District of Baft County, Kerman Province, Iran. At the 2006 census, its population was 35, in 6 families.
