= Abadi Kheyrabad =

Abadi Kheyrabad آبادی خیرآباد
- Village
- Country: Iran
- Province: Kerman
- County: Baft
- Bakhsh: Central
- Rural District: Khabar

Population (2006)
  - Total: 34
- Time zone: UTC+3:30 (IRST)
  - Summer (DST): UTC+4:30 (IRDT)

Abadi Kheyrabad (Persian: آبادی خیرآباد, also Romanized as Abādī Kheyrābād) is a village in Khabar Rural District, in the Central District of Baft County, Kerman Province, Iran. At the 2006 census, its population was 34, in 10 families.
