= Deh-e Sajer =

Deh-e Sajer ده ساجر
- Village
- Location within Iran
- Coordinates: 29°22′49″N 56°35′20″E
- Country: Iran
- Province: Kerman
- County: Baft
- Bakhsh: Central
- Rural District: Gughar

Population (2006)
  - Total: 71
- Time zone: UTC+3:30 (IRST)
  - Summer (DST): UTC+4:30 (IRDT)

Deh-e Sajer (Persian: ده ساجر, also Romanized as Deh-e Sājer) is a village in Gughar Rural District, in the Central District of Baft County, Kerman Province, Iran. At the 2006 census, its population was 71, in 22 families.
