= Suruiyeh =

Suruiyeh سوروييه
- Village
- Location within Iran
- Coordinates: 28°58′43″N 56°35′27″E
- Country: Iran
- Province: Kerman
- County: Baft
- Bakhsh: Central
- Rural District: Dashtab

Population (2006)
  - Total: 81
- Time zone: UTC+3:30 (IRST)
  - Summer (DST): UTC+4:30 (IRDT)

Suruiyeh (Persian: سوروييه, also Romanized as Sūrū’īyeh; also known as Soroo’eyeh and Sorū’īyeh) is a village in Dashtab Rural District, in the Central District of Baft County, Kerman Province, Iran. At the 2006 census, its population was 81, in 23 families.
