= Talkheh Char =

Talkheh Char تلخه چار
- Village
- Location within Iran
- Coordinates: 29°21′02″N 56°43′25″E
- Country: Iran
- Province: Kerman
- County: Baft
- Bakhsh: Central
- Rural District: Bezenjan

Population (2006)
  - Total: 105
- Time zone: UTC+3:30 (IRST)
  - Summer (DST): UTC+4:30 (IRDT)

Talkheh Char (Persian: تلخه چار, also Romanized as Talkheh Chār; also known as Talkh Chāh) is a village in Bezenjan Rural District, in the Central District of Baft County, Kerman Province, Iran. At the 2006 census, its population was 105, in 20 families.
