= Godar Sabz =

Godar Sabz گدارسبز
- Village
- Location within Iran
- Coordinates: 28°52′48″N 56°50′51″E
- Country: Iran
- Province: Kerman
- County: Baft
- Bakhsh: Central
- Rural District: Dashtab

Population (2006)
  - Total: 158
- Time zone: UTC+3:30 (IRST)
  - Summer (DST): UTC+4:30 (IRDT)

Godar Sabz (Persian: گدارسبز, also Romanized as Godār Sabz) is a village in Dashtab Rural District, in the Central District of Baft County, Kerman Province, Iran. At the 2006 census, its population was 158, in 34 families.
