= Deh Lachin =

Deh Lachin ده لاچين
- Village
- Location within Iran
- Coordinates: 28°58′07″N 56°40′44″E
- Country: Iran
- Province: Kerman
- County: Baft
- Bakhsh: Central
- Rural District: Dashtab

Population (2006)
  - Total: 51
- Time zone: UTC+3:30 (IRST)
  - Summer (DST): UTC+4:30 (IRDT)

Deh Lachin (Persian: ده لاچين, also Romanized as Deh Lāchīn and Deh-e Lāchīn; also known as Deh Laki) is a village in Dashtab Rural District, in the Central District of Baft County, Kerman Province, Iran. At the 2006 census, its population was 51, in 10 families.
