= Torang =

Torang طرنگ
- Village
- Location within Iran
- Coordinates: 28°45′29″N 56°48′04″E
- Country: Iran
- Province: Kerman
- County: Baft
- Bakhsh: Central
- Rural District: Koushk

Population (2006)
  - Total: 300
- Time zone: UTC+3:30 (IRST)
  - Summer (DST): UTC+4:30 (IRDT)

Torang (Persian: طرنگ, also Romanized as Ţorang; also known as Tarank) is a village in Dashtab Rural District, in the Central District of Baft County, Kerman Province, Iran. At the 2006 census, its population was 300 people, in 77 families.
