= Ab Bahri =

Ab Bahri اببحري
- Village
- Location within Iran
- Coordinates: 29°22′45″N 56°34′42″E
- Country: Iran
- Province: Kerman
- County: Baft
- Bakhsh: Central
- Rural District: Kiskan

Population (2006)
  - Total: 76
- Time zone: UTC+3:30 (IRST)
  - Summer (DST): UTC+4:30 (IRDT)

Ab Bahri (Persian: اببحري, also Romanized as Āb Baḩrī and Āb-e Baḩrī) is a village in Kiskan Rural District, in the Central District of Baft County, Kerman province, Iran. At the 2006 census, its population was 76, in 27 families.
