= Deh-e Geluband =

Deh-e Geluband ده گلوبند
- Village
- Location within Iran
- Coordinates: 29°20′24″N 56°36′00″E
- Country: Iran
- Province: Kerman
- County: Baft
- Bakhsh: Central
- Rural District: Kiskan

Population (2006)
  - Total: 8
- Time zone: UTC+3:30 (IRST)
  - Summer (DST): UTC+4:30 (IRDT)

Deh-e Geluband (Persian: ده گلوبند, also Romanized as Deh-e Gelūband) is a village in Kiskan Rural District, in the Central District of Baft County, Kerman Province, Iran. At the 2006 census, its population was 8, in 4 families.
