= Sang-e Pahn =

Sang-e Pahn سنگ پهن
- Village
- Location within Iran
- Coordinates: 29°19′33″N 56°27′02″E
- Country: Iran
- Province: Kerman
- County: Baft
- Bakhsh: Central
- Rural District: Fathabad

Population (2006)
  - Total: 60
- Time zone: UTC+3:30 (IRST)
  - Summer (DST): UTC+4:30 (IRDT)

Sang-e Pahn (Persian: سنگ پهن) is a village in Fathabad Rural District, in the Central District of Baft County, Kerman Province, Iran. At the 2006 census, its population was 60, in 14 families, 4.2 people per family.
