= Ab Ghamushiyeh =

Ab Ghamushiyeh اب غاموشيه
- Village
- Country: Iran
- Province: Kerman
- County: Baft
- Bakhsh: Central
- Rural District: Khabar

Population (2006)
  - Total: 21
- Time zone: UTC+3:30 (IRST)
  - Summer (DST): UTC+4:30 (IRDT)

Ab Ghamushiyeh (Persian: اب غاموشيه, also Romanized as Āb Ghāmūshīyeh) is a village in Khabar Rural District, in the Central District of Baft County, Kerman Province, Iran. At the 2006 census, its population was 21, with 5 families.
