= Andardari =

Andardari اندردري
- Village
- Location within Iran
- Coordinates: 29°23′43″N 56°26′08″E
- Country: Iran
- Province: Kerman
- County: Baft
- Bakhsh: Central
- Rural District: Gughar

Population (2006)
  - Total: 24
- Time zone: UTC+3:30 (IRST)
  - Summer (DST): UTC+4:30 (IRDT)

Andardari (Persian: اندردري, also Romanized as Āndardarī) is a village in Gughar Rural District, in the Central District of Baft County, Kerman Province, Iran. At the 2006 census, its population was 24, in 6 families.
