= Mehr Saleh =

Mehr Saleh مهرصالح
- Village
- Location within Iran
- Coordinates: 29°22′39″N 56°22′19″E
- Country: Iran
- Province: Kerman
- County: Baft
- Bakhsh: Central
- Rural District: Fathabad

Population (2006)
  - Total: 108
- Time zone: UTC+3:30 (IRST)
  - Summer (DST): UTC+4:30 (IRDT)

Mehr Saleh (Persian: مهرصالح, also Romanized as Mehr Şāleḥ; also known as Mirṣāleḥ) is a village in Fathabad Rural District, in the Central District of Baft County, Kerman Province, Iran. At the 2006 census, its population was 108, in 29 families.
