= Gorguiyeh =

Gorguiyeh گرگوئيه
- Village
- Location within Iran
- Coordinates: 29°13′30″N 56°31′59″E
- Country: Iran
- Province: Kerman
- County: Baft
- Bakhsh: Central
- Rural District: Bezenjan

Population (2006)
  - Total: 17
- Time zone: UTC+3:30 (IRST)
  - Summer (DST): UTC+4:30 (IRDT)

Gorguiyeh (Persian: گرگوئيه, also Romanized as Gorgū’īyeh; also known as Gorgnow’īyeh and Kargū’īyeh) is a village in Bezenjan Rural District, in the Central District of Baft County, Kerman Province, Iran. At the 2006 census, its population was 17, in 6 families.
