= Jarub =

Jarub جاروب
- Village
- Location within Iran
- Coordinates: 28°48′58″N 56°15′59″E
- Country: Iran
- Province: Kerman
- County: Baft
- Bakhsh: Central
- Rural District: Khabar

Population (2006)
  - Total: 170
- Time zone: UTC+3:30 (IRST)
  - Summer (DST): UTC+4:30 (IRDT)

Jarub (Persian: جاروب, also Romanized as Jārūb) is a village in Khabar Rural District, in the Central District of Baft County, Kerman Province, Iran. At the 2006 census, its population was 170, in 39 families.
