= Harmuiyeh =

Harmuiyeh هارموئيه
- Village
- Location within Iran
- Coordinates: 29°19′57″N 56°24′48″E
- Country: Iran
- Province: Kerman
- County: Baft
- Bakhsh: Central
- Rural District: Gughar

Population (2006)
  - Total: 117
- Time zone: UTC+3:30 (IRST)
  - Summer (DST): UTC+4:30 (IRDT)

Harmuiyeh (Persian: هارموئيه, also Romanized as Hārmū’īyeh and Hormū’īyeh; also known as Farmū’īyeh) is a village in Gughar Rural District, in the Central District of Baft County, Kerman Province, Iran. At the 2006 census, its population was 117, in 30 families.
