= Ahuiyeh =

Ahuiyeh اهوييه
- Village
- Location within Iran
- Coordinates: 29°16′27″N 56°44′14″E
- Country: Iran
- Province: Kerman
- County: Baft
- Bakhsh: Central
- Rural District: Bezenjan

Population (2006)
  - Total: 524
- Time zone: UTC+3:30 (IRST)
  - Summer (DST): UTC+4:30 (IRDT)

Ahuiyeh (Persian: اهوييه, also Romanized as Āhū’īyeh) is a village in Bezenjan Rural District, in the Central District of Baft County, Kerman Province, Iran. At the 2006 census, its population was 524, in 128 families.
