= Deh-e Mirzai =

Deh-e Mirzai ده ميرزايي
- Village
- Location within Iran
- Coordinates: 29°21′50″N 56°35′20″E
- Country: Iran
- Province: Kerman
- County: Baft
- Bakhsh: Central
- Rural District: Kiskan

Population (2006)
  - Total: 36
- Time zone: UTC+3:30 (IRST)
  - Summer (DST): UTC+4:30 (IRDT)

Deh-e Mirzai (Persian: ده ميرزايي, also Romanized as Deh-e Mīrzā’ī and Deh Mīrzā’ī) is a village in Kiskan Rural District, in the Central District of Baft County, Kerman Province, Iran. At the 2006 census, its population was 36, in 12 families.
