= Tir Kaman =

Tir Kaman تيركمان
- Village
- Location within Iran
- Coordinates: 28°56′03″N 56°46′26″E
- Country: Iran
- Province: Kerman
- County: Baft
- Bakhsh: Central
- Rural District: Bezenjan

Population (2006)
  - Total: 53
- Time zone: UTC+3:30 (IRST)

Tir Kaman (Persian: تيركمان, also Romanized as Tīr Kamān and Tīr-e Kamān) is a village in Bezenjan Rural District, in the Central District of Baft County, Kerman Province, Iran. At the 2006 census, its population was 53, in 16 families.
