= Dikhuiyeh =

Dikhuiyeh ديخوييه
- Village
- Location within Iran
- Coordinates: 28°48′55″N 56°15′21″E
- Country: Iran
- Province: Kerman
- County: Baft
- Bakhsh: Central
- Rural District: Khabar

Population (2006)
  - Total: 616
- Time zone: UTC+3:30 (IRST)
  - Summer (DST): UTC+4:30 (IRDT)

Dikhuiyeh (Persian: ديخوييه, also romanized as Dīkhū’īyeh and Dikhoo’yeh; also known as Deh Kūh, Dehkuye, Dehkūyeh, and Dīkhū) is a village in Khabar Rural District, in the Central District of Baft County, Kerman Province, Iran. At the 2006 census its population was 616, in 137 families.
