= Kordbastan =

Kordbastan كردبستان
- Village
- Location within Iran
- Coordinates: 28°43′56″N 56°47′23″E
- Country: Iran
- Province: Kerman
- County: Baft
- Bakhsh: Central
- Rural District: Dashtab

Population (2006)
  - Total: 115
- Time zone: UTC+3:30 (IRST)
  - Summer (DST): UTC+4:30 (IRDT)

Kordbastan (Persian: كردبستان, also Romanized as Kordbastān and Kord-e Bostān; also known as Gard Bestān, Gord Bastān, and Gord-e Bostān) is a village in Dashtab Rural District, in the Central District of Baft County, Kerman Province, Iran. At the 2006 census, its population was 115, in 29 families.
