= Kah Dan =

Kahdan كاه دان
- Village
- Location within Iran
- Coordinates: 28°46′53″N 56°09′34″E
- Country: Iran
- Province: Kerman
- County: Baft
- Bakhsh: Central
- Rural District: Khabar

Population (2006)
  - Total: 46
- Time zone: UTC+3:30 (IRST)
  - Summer (DST): UTC+4:30 (IRDT)

Kahdan (Persian: كاه دان, also Romanized as Kāhdān, Kāhdān-e Aḩmad Khānī, and Kāhdān-e Bālā) is a village in Khabar Rural District, in the Central District of Baft County, Kerman Province, Iran. At the 2006 census, its population was 46, in 13 families.
