= Emamzadeh-ye Seyyed Ali =

Emamzadeh-ye Seyyed Ali امامزاده سيدعلي
- Village
- Location within Iran
- Coordinates: 29°00′30″N 56°38′49″E
- Country: Iran
- Province: Kerman
- County: Baft
- Bakhsh: Central
- Rural District: Dashtab

Population (2006)
  - Total: 31
- Time zone: UTC+3:30 (IRST)
  - Summer (DST): UTC+4:30 (IRDT)

Emamzadeh-ye Seyyed Ali (Persian: امامزاده سيدعلي, also Romanized as Emāmzādeh-ye Seyyed ‘Alī; also known as Seyyed ‘Alī Mūsá Dashtāb (Persian: سيدعلي موسي دشتاب) and Emāmzādeh Seyyed ‘Alī Mūsá) is a village in Dashtab Rural District, in the Central District of Baft County, Kerman Province, Iran. At the 2006 census, its population was 31, in 12 families.
