= Zanai =

Zanai Pönk زنايي
- Village
- Location within Iran
- Coordinates: 28°57′38″N 56°33′35″E
- Country: Iran
- Province: Kerman
- County: Baft
- Bakhsh: Central
- Rural District: Dashtab

Population (2006)
  - Total: 97
- Time zone: UTC+3:30 (IRST)
  - Summer (DST): UTC+4:30 (IRDT)

Zanai (Persian: زنايي, also Romanized as Zanā’ī; also known as Zanā’īyeh) is a village in Dashtab Rural District, in the Central District of Baft County, Kerman Province, Iran. At the 2006 census, its population was 97, in 20 families.
