= Nahr-e Shir =

Nahr-e Shir نهرشير
- Village
- Location within Iran
- Coordinates: 29°22′44″N 56°38′16″E
- Country: Iran
- Province: Kerman
- County: Baft
- Bakhsh: Central
- Rural District: Kiskan

Population (2006)
  - Total: 35
- Time zone: UTC+3:30 (IRST)
  - Summer (DST): UTC+4:30 (IRDT)

Nahr-e Shir (Persian: نهرشير, also Romanized as Nahr-e Shīr; also known as Nahr-e Shīr-e Kiskan) is a village in Kiskan Rural District, in the Central District of Baft County, Kerman Province, Iran. At the 2006 census, its population was 35, in 12 families.
