= Gowd-e Sorkh =

Gowd-e Sorkh گودسرخ
- Village
- Location within Iran
- Coordinates: 29°09′57″N 56°37′28″E
- Country: Iran
- Province: Kerman
- County: Baft
- Bakhsh: Central
- Rural District: Bezenjan

Population (2006)
  - Total: 37
- Time zone: UTC+3:30 (IRST)
  - Summer (DST): UTC+4:30 (IRDT)

Gowd-e Sorkh (Persian: گودسرخ, also romanized as Gowd Sorkh) is a village in Bezenjan Rural District, in the Central District of Baft County, Kerman Province, Iran. At the 2006 census, its population was 37, in 7 families.
