= Bahkin-e Pain =

Bahkin-e Pain بهكين پائين
- Village
- Location within Iran
- Coordinates: 29°23′31″N 56°25′40″E
- Country: Iran
- Province: Kerman
- County: Baft
- Bakhsh: Central
- Rural District: Gughar

Population (2006)
  - Total: 44
- Time zone: UTC+3:30 (IRST)
  - Summer (DST): UTC+4:30 (IRDT)

Bahkin-e Pain (Persian: بهكين پائين, also Romanized as Bahkīn-e Pā’īn; also known as Behkīn-e Soflá) is a village in Gughar Rural District, in the Central District of Baft County, Kerman Province, Iran. At the 2006 census, its population was 44, in 9 families.
