= Mian Rud Ab =

Mian Rud Ab ميان روداب
- Village
- Location within Iran
- Coordinates: 29°23′21″N 56°38′01″E
- Country: Iran
- Province: Kerman
- County: Baft
- Bakhsh: Central
- Rural District: Kiskan

Population (2006)
  - Total: 112
- Time zone: UTC+3:30 (IRST)
  - Summer (DST): UTC+4:30 (IRDT)

Mian Rud Ab (Persian: ميان روداب, also Romanized as Mīān Rūd Āb; also known as Mīān Ābrūd) is a village in Kiskan Rural District, in the Central District of Baft County, Kerman Province, Iran. At the 2006 census, its population was 112, in 34 families.
