= Gavehsoltani =

Gavehsoltani گوه سلطاني
- Village
- Location within Iran
- Coordinates: 29°29′59″N 56°29′47″E
- Country: Iran
- Province: Kerman
- County: Baft
- Bakhsh: Central
- Rural District: Gughar

Population (2006)
  - Total: 13
- Time zone: UTC+3:30 (IRST)
  - Summer (DST): UTC+4:30 (IRDT)

Gavehsoltani (Persian: گوه سلطاني, also Romanized as Gavehsolṭānī) is a village in Gughar Rural District, in the Central District of Baft County, Kerman Province, Iran. At the 2006 census, its population was 13, in 4 families.
