= Jahan Najan =

Jahan Najan جهان نجان
- Village
- Location within Iran
- Coordinates: 29°21′14″N 56°38′27″E
- Country: Iran
- Province: Kerman
- County: Baft
- Bakhsh: Central
- Rural District: Kiskan

Population (2006)
  - Total: 163
- Time zone: UTC+3:30 (IRST)
  - Summer (DST): UTC+4:30 (IRDT)

Jahan Najan (Persian: جهان نجان, also Romanized as Jahān Najān; also known as Jahān Jān) is a village in Kiskan Rural District, in the Central District of Baft County, Kerman Province, Iran. At the 2006 census, its population was 163, in 46 families.
