= Bagh-e Malek, Kerman =

Bagh-e Malek باغ ملك
- Village
- Location within Iran
- Coordinates: 29°22′59″N 56°37′35″E
- Country: Iran
- Province: Kerman
- County: Baft
- Bakhsh: Central
- Rural District: Kiskan

Population (2006)
  - Total: 60
- Time zone: UTC+3:30 (IRST)
  - Summer (DST): UTC+4:30 (IRDT)

Bagh-e Malek (Persian: باغ ملك, also Romanized as Bāgh-e Malek and Bāgh Malek) is a village in Kiskan Rural District, in the Central District of Baft County, Kerman Province, Iran. At the 2006 census, its population was 60, in 23 families.
