= Magasi =

Magasi or Megesi (Persian: مگسي) may refer to:

- Magasi, Baft
- Megesi, Jiroft
