= Khafkuiyeh, Baft =

Khafkuiyeh خافكوئيه
- Village
- Location within Iran
- Coordinates: 28°57′14″N 56°46′32″E
- Country: Iran
- Province: Kerman
- County: Baft
- Bakhsh: Central
- Rural District: Bezenjan

Population (2006)
  - Total: 161
- Time zone: UTC+3:30 (IRST)
  - Summer (DST): UTC+4:30 (IRDT)

Khafkuiyeh (Persian: خافكوئيه, also Romanized as Khāfkū‘īyeh; also known as Khafgoo’eyeh, Khāfkū, Khāf Kūh, Khānkū, and Khvāfkūh) is a village in Bezenjan Rural District, in the Central District of Baft County, Kerman Province, Iran. At the 2006 census, its population was 161, in 46 families.
