= Khafkuiyeh =

Khafkuiyeh (Persian: خافكوئيه), also rendered as Khafgooeyeh may refer to:

- Khafkuiyeh, Baft
- Khafkuiyeh, Jiroft
