= Magasi, Baft =

Magasi مگسي
- Village
- Location within Iran
- Coordinates: 29°24′24″N 56°17′50″E
- Country: Iran
- Province: Kerman
- County: Baft
- Bakhsh: Central
- Rural District: Fathabad

Population (2006)
  - Total: 16
- Time zone: UTC+3:30 (IRST)
  - Summer (DST): UTC+4:30 (IRDT)

Magasi (Persian: مگسي, also Romanized as Magasī) is a village in Fathabad Rural District, in the Central District of Baft County, Kerman Province, Iran. At the 2006 census, its population was 16, in 6 families.
