= Kashkuiyeh, Baft =

Village in Kerman province, Iran

Kashkuiyeh Persian: كشكوييه
- Village
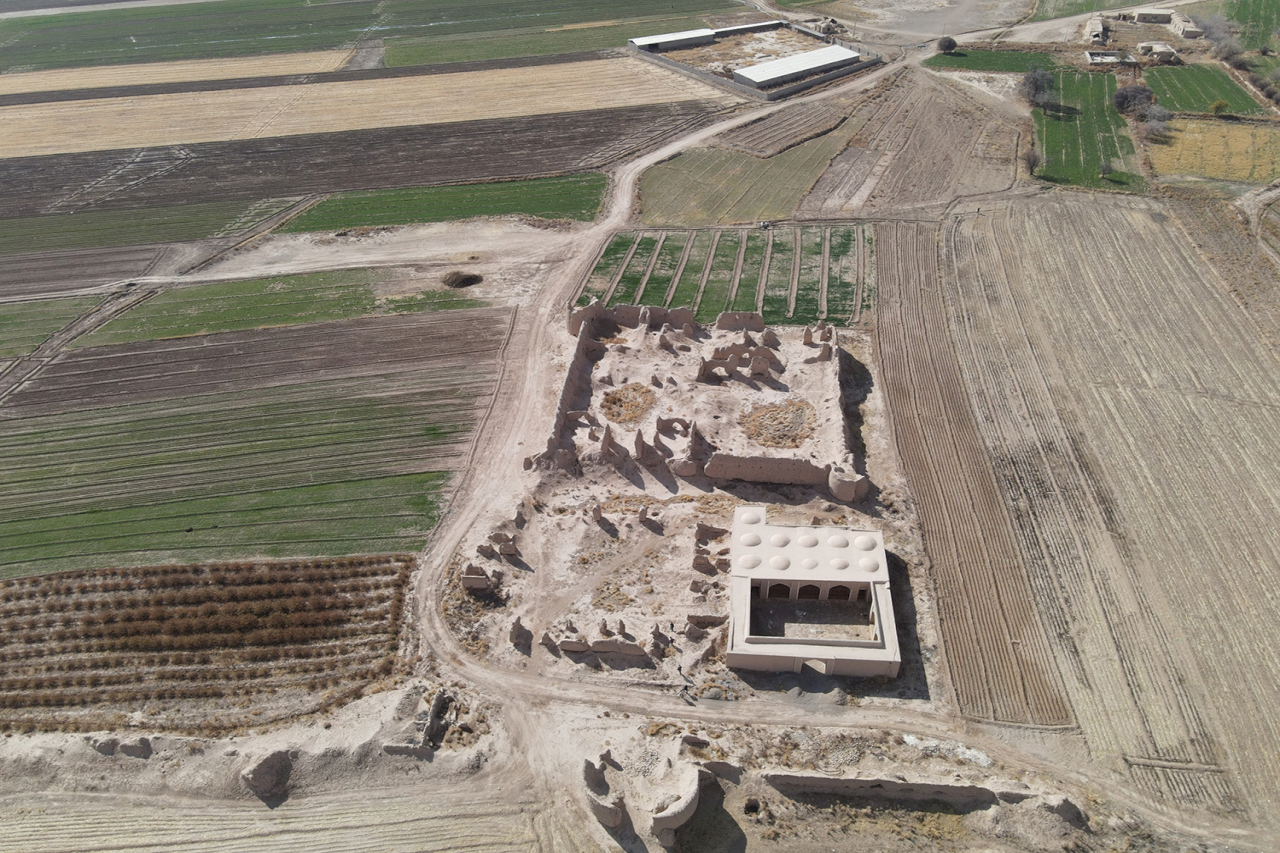

- Location within Iran
- Coordinates: 28°58′00″N 56°35′27″E
- Country: Iran
- Province: Kerman
- County: Baft
- District: Khabar
- Rural District: Dashtab

Population (2016)
  - Total: 2,760
- Time zone: UTC+3:30 (IRST)
- Website: www.toluekerman.ir

Kashkuiyeh (Persian: كشكوييه) (Note: Also romanized as Kashkū’īyeh; also known as Kashkoo’eyeh Dasht Ab, Kāshkūh, and Kashkū’īyeh-ye Dasht-e Āb) is a village in Dashtab Rural District of Khabar District, Baft County, Kerman province, Iran, serving as capital of both the district and the rural district.

== Demographics ==
=== Population ===
At the time of the 2006 National Census, the village's population was 871 in 185 households, when it was in the Central District. The following census in 2011 counted 2,092 people in 642 households, by which time the rural district had been separated from the district in the establishment of Khabar District. The 2016 census measured the population of the village as 2,760 people in 1,070 households. It was the most populous village in its rural district.

== Climate ==
The climate of Kashkuiyeh is temperate and dry. The summers of this city are relatively hot and the winters are cold.
