= Amirabad, western Gughar =

Village in Kerman province, Iran

Amirabad Persian: اميراباد
- Village
- Location within Iran
- Coordinates: 29°27′58″N 56°24′50″E
- Country: Iran
- Province: Kerman
- County: Baft
- District: Central
- Rural District: Gughar

Population (2016)
  - Total: 1,621
- Time zone: UTC+3:30 (IRST)

Amirabad (Persian: اميراباد) (Note: Also romanized as Amīrābād) is a village in, and the capital of, Gughar Rural District of the Central District of Baft County, Kerman province, Iran.

== Demographics ==
=== Population ===
At the time of the 2006 National Census, the village's population was 920 in 222 households. The following census in 2011 counted 1,203 people in 364 households. The 2016 census measured the population of the village as 1,621 people in 572 households. It was the most populous village in its rural district.
