= Shast Pich-e Olya =

Shast Pich-e Olya شصت پيچ عليا
- Village
- Location within Iran
- Coordinates: 29°10′48″N 56°50′57″E
- Country: Iran
- Province: Kerman
- County: Baft
- Bakhsh: Central
- Rural District: Bezenjan

Population (2006)
  - Total: 133
- Time zone: UTC+3:30 (IRST)
  - Summer (DST): UTC+4:30 (IRDT)

Shast Pich-e Olya (Persian: شصت پيچ عليا, also Romanized as Shaşt Pīch-e ‘Olyā; also known as Shaşt Fīch and Shaşt Pīch) is a village in Bezenjan Rural District, in the Central District of Baft County, Kerman Province, Iran. At the 2006 census, its population was 133, in 47 families.
