= Bidkorduiyeh =

Village in Kerman province, Iran

Bidkorduiyeh Persian: بيدكردوييه
- Village
- Location within Iran
- Coordinates: 29°19′01″N 56°24′21″E
- Country: Iran
- Province: Kerman
- County: Baft
- District: Central
- Rural District: Fathabad

Population (2016)
  - Total: 445
- Time zone: UTC+3:30 (IRST)

Bidkorduiyeh (Persian: بيدكردوييه) (Note: Also romanized as Bid Korduiyeh, Bīd Kordūīyeh; also known as Bīdkordoeeyeh) is a village in, and the capital of, Fathabad Rural District of the Central District of Baft County, Kerman province, Iran.

== Demographics ==
=== Population ===
At the time of the 2006 National Census, the village's population was 495 individuals residing in 127 households. The following census in 2011 counted 254 people in 82 households. The 2016 census measured the population of the village as 445 people in 154 households. It was the most populous village in its rural district.
