= Deh Zarchi =

Deh Zarchi ده زارچي
- Village
- Location within Iran
- Coordinates: 29°20′18″N 56°38′06″E
- Country: Iran
- Province: Kerman
- County: Baft
- Bakhsh: Central
- Rural District: Kiskan

Population (2006)
  - Total: 118
- Time zone: UTC+3:30 (IRST)
  - Summer (DST): UTC+4:30 (IRDT)

Deh Zarchi (Persian: ده زارچي, also Romanized as Deh Zārchī; also known as Zārchī) is a village in Kiskan Rural District, in the Central District of Baft County, Kerman Province, Iran. At the 2006 census, its population was 118, in 36 families.
