= Borkenan =

Borkenan (Persian: بركنان), also rendered as Burkenan, may refer to:

- Borkenan-e Olya
- Borkenan-e Sofla
