= Borkenan-e Olya =

Borkenan-e Olya بركنان عليا
- Village
- Location within Iran
- Coordinates: 29°19′13″N 56°42′26″E
- Country: Iran
- Province: Kerman
- County: Baft
- Bakhsh: Central
- Rural District: Bezenjan

Population (2006)
  - Total: 221
- Time zone: UTC+3:30 (IRST)
  - Summer (DST): UTC+4:30 (IRDT)

Borkenan-e Olya (Persian: بركنان عليا, also Romanized as Borkenān-e ‘Olyā; also known as Būrkenān-e ‘Olyā) is a village in Bezenjan Rural District, in the Central District of Baft County, Kerman Province, Iran. At the 2006 census, its population was 221, in 46 families.
