= Karin, Kerman =

Village in Kerman province, Iran

Karin Persian: كرين
- Village
- Location within Iran
- Coordinates: 29°22′07″N 56°38′20″E
- Country: Iran
- Province: Kerman
- County: Baft
- District: Central
- Rural District: Kiskan

Population (2016)
  - Total: 735
- Time zone: UTC+3:30 (IRST)

Karin (Persian: كرين) (Note: Also romanized as Karīn) is a village in, and the capital of, Kiskan Rural District of the Central District of Baft County, Kerman province, Iran.

== Demographics ==
=== Population ===
At the time of the 2006 National Census, the village's population was 151 in 41 households. The following census in 2011 counted 386 people in 109 households. The 2016 census measured the population of the village as 735 people in 219 households. It was the most populous village in its rural district.
