= Abydos =

Abydos may refer to:

- Abydos, a progressive metal side project of German singer Andy Kuntz
- Abydos (Hellespont), an ancient city in Mysia, Asia Minor
- Abydos (Stargate), name of a fictional planet in the Stargate science fiction universe
- Abydos, Egypt, a city in ancient Egypt
- Abydos Station, a pastoral lease and cattle station in Western Australia

== See also ==
- Abidu, a village in Iran
- Abidos, Pyrénées-Atlantiques, in southwestern France
