= Jowkar-e Mehdi =

Jowkar-e Mehdi جوكارمهدي
- Village
- Location within Iran
- Coordinates: 29°25′57″N 56°24′07″E
- Country: Iran
- Province: Kerman
- County: Baft
- Bakhsh: Central
- Rural District: Gughar

Population (2006)
  - Total: 30
- Time zone: UTC+3:30 (IRST)
  - Summer (DST): UTC+4:30 (IRDT)

Jowkar-e Mehdi (Persian: جوكارمهدي, also Romanized as Jowkār-e Mehdī; also known as Jokār-e ‘Olyā) is a village in Gughar Rural District, in the Central District of Baft County, Kerman Province, Iran. At the 2006 census, its population was 30, in 8 families.
