= Shast Pich-e Sofla =

Shast Pich-e Sofla شصت پيچ سفلي
- Village
- Location within Iran
- Coordinates: 29°09′52″N 56°51′11″E
- Country: Iran
- Province: Kermanشص
- County: Baft
- Bakhsh: Central
- Rural District: Bezenjan

Population (2006)
  - Total: 169
- Time zone: UTC+3:30 (IRST)
  - Summer (DST): UTC+4:30 (IRDT)

Shast Pich-e Sofla (Persian: شصت پيچ سفلي, also Romanized as Shaşt Pīch-e Soflá) is a village in Bezenjan Rural District, in the Central District of Baft County, Kerman Province, Iran. At the 2006 census, its population was 169, in 42 families.
