= Bagh-e Malek (disambiguation) =

Bagh-e Malek is a city in Khuzestan Province, Iran.

Bagh-e Malek (Persian: باغ ملك) may also refer to:

- Bagh-e Malek, Isfahan
- Bagh-e Malek, Kerman
- Bagh-e Malek County, in Khuzestan Province
