= Khafkuiyeh, Jiroft =

Khafkuiyeh خافكوييه
- Village
- Location within Iran
- Coordinates: 29°12′28″N 57°17′31″E
- Country: Iran
- Province: Kerman
- County: baft
- Bakhsh: bezenjan
- Rural District: bezenjan

Population (2006)
  - Total: 253
- Time zone: UTC+3:30 (IRST)
  - Summer (DST): UTC+4:30 (IRDT)

Khafkuiyeh (Persian: خافكوييه, also Romanized as Khāfkū’īyeh; also known as Khāfkūh) is a village in Bezenjan Rural District, Bezenjan District, Baft County, Kerman Province, Iran. At the 2006 census, its population was 253, in 37 families.
