= Fich =

Fich is a surname. Notable people with the surname include:

- Charlotte Fich (born 1961), Danish stage, film and television actress
- Ove Fich (1949–2012), Danish politician
- Peter Christiansen Fich (born 1941), Danish rower
- Thomas Fich (died 1517), Irish ecclesiastic and compiler

== See also ==
- Shast Fich (disambiguation)
