= Shast Pich =

Shast Pich (Persian: شصت پيچ), also rendered as Shast Fich may refer to:

- Shast Pich-e Olya
- Shast Pich-e Sofla
