= Bongan, Baft =

Village in Kerman province, Iran

Bongan Persian: بنگان
- Village
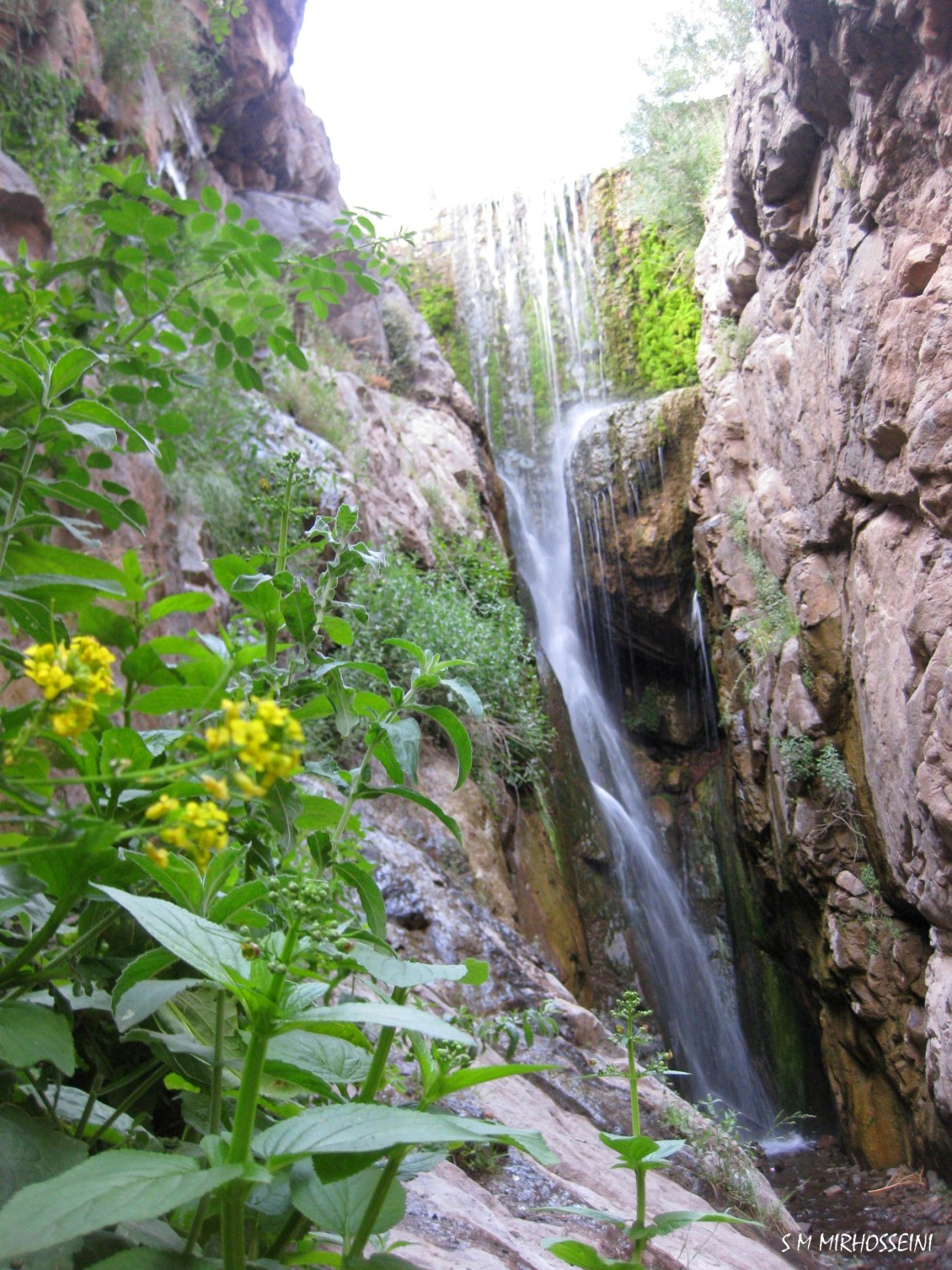
- Bongan Waterfall

- Location within Iran
- Coordinates: 29°18′30″N 56°43′17″E
- Country: Iran
- Province: Kerman
- County: Baft
- District: Central
- Rural District: Bezenjan

Population (2016)
  - Total: 1,113
- Time zone: UTC+3:30 (IRST)

Bongan (Persian: بنگان) (Note: Also romanized as Bangān and Bongān; also known as Beshgān) is a village in Bezenjan Rural District of the Central District of Baft County, Kerman province, Iran.

== Demographics ==
=== Population ===
At the time of the 2006 National Census, the village's population was 673 in 177 households. The following census in 2011 counted 1,100 people in 319 households. The 2016 census measured the population of the village as 1,113 people in 356 households. It was the most populous village in its rural district.
