= Zarchi =

Zarchi may refer to:

- Zarchi, Iran, a village in Yazd Province, Iran
- Meir Zarchi (b. 1937), Israeli film director
- Nurit Zarchi (b. 1941), Israeli poet and author
- Hirschy Zarchi, American campus rabbi
