= Bongan =

Bongan or Bangan (Persian: بنگان) may refer to:

- Bongan, Baft
- Bongan, Rabor
