= Hoshoun Castle =

Castle in Kerman Province, Iran

Hoshoun castle
- قلعه هشون
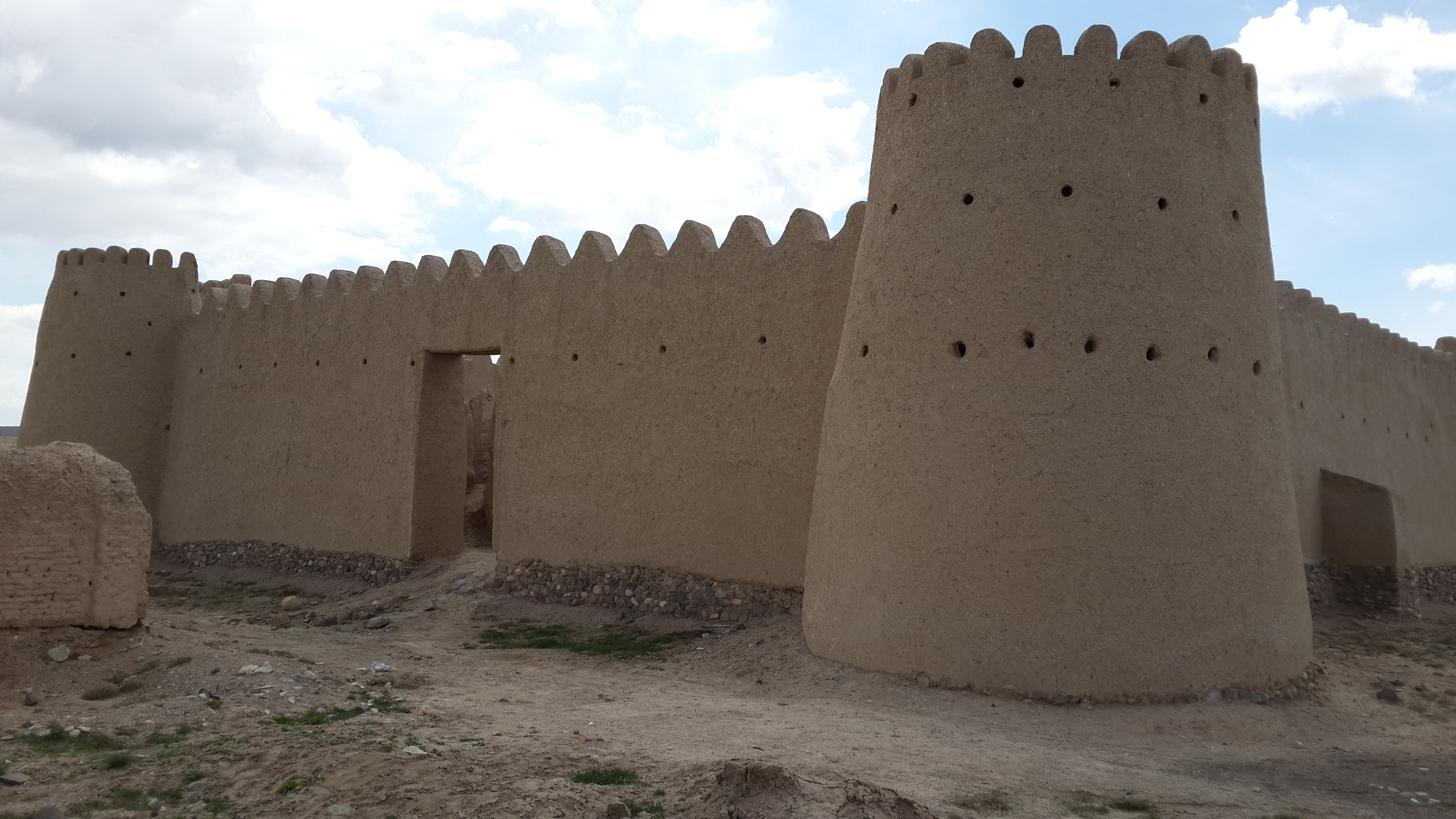

General information
- Type: Castle
- Location: Baft County, Iran

Hoshoun castle (Persian: قلعه هشون) is a historical castle located in Baft County in Kerman Province, The longevity of this fortress dates back to the Safavid dynasty.
