= Qanj Ali Khan Afshar Castle =

Castle in Kerman Province, Iran

Qanj Ali Khan Afshar castle
- قلعه غنجعلیخان افشار
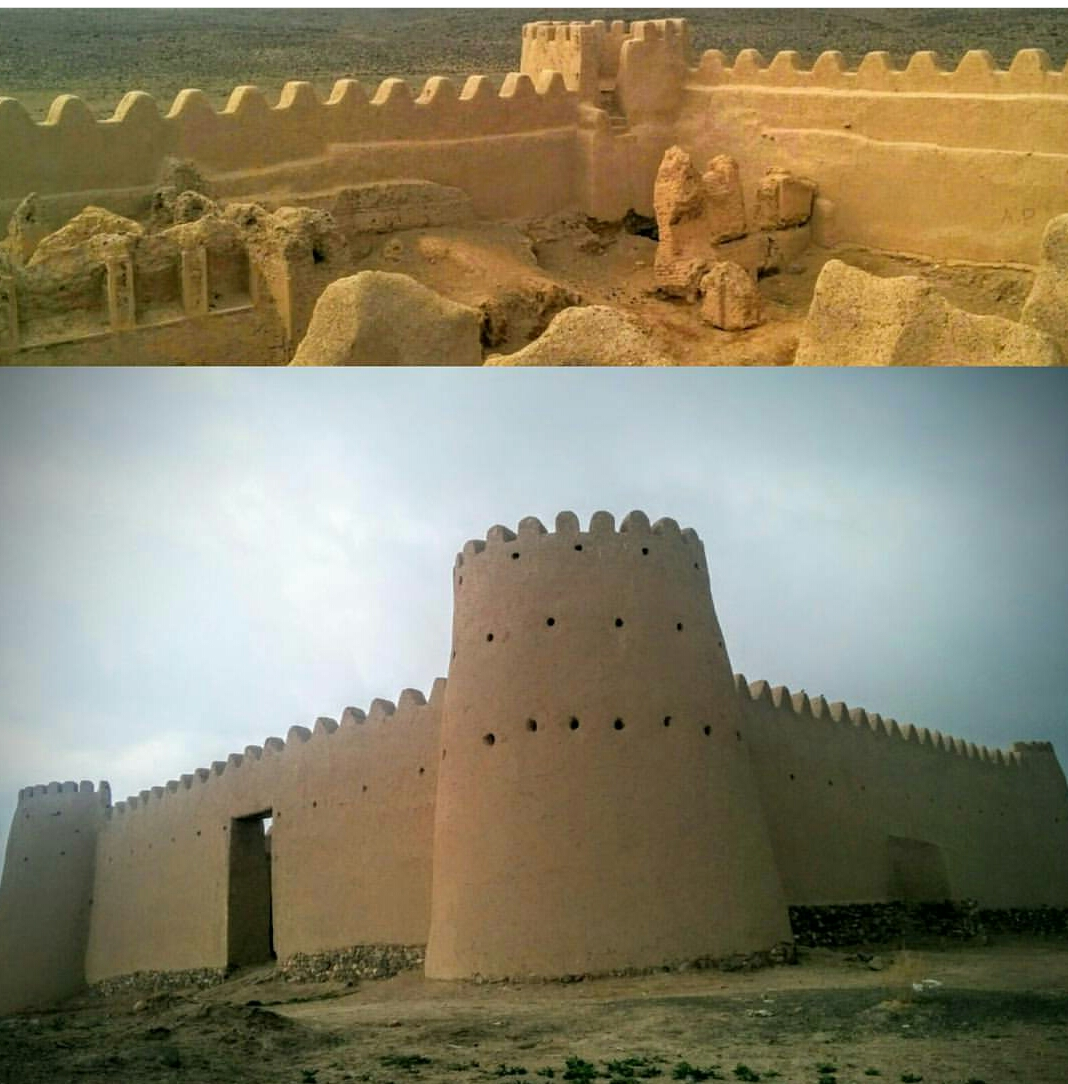
- Interactive map of the Qanj Ali Khan Afshar castle area

General information
- Type: Castle
- Location: Baft County, Iran
- Coordinates: 29.2295°N 56.28203°E

Qanj Ali Khan Afshar castle (Persian: قلعه غنجعلیخان افشار) is a historical castle located in Baft County in Kerman Province, The longevity of this fortress dates back to the Safavid dynasty.
