= Jowkar, Afghanistan =

Joykar
- Location in Afghanistan
- Coordinates: 35°31′17″N 63°22′16″E
- Country: Afghanistan
- Province: Badghis Province
- Time zone: + 4.30

Joykar is a village in Badghis Province in north western Afghanistan.
