= Abidos, Pyrénées-Atlantiques =

Abidos
- Commune
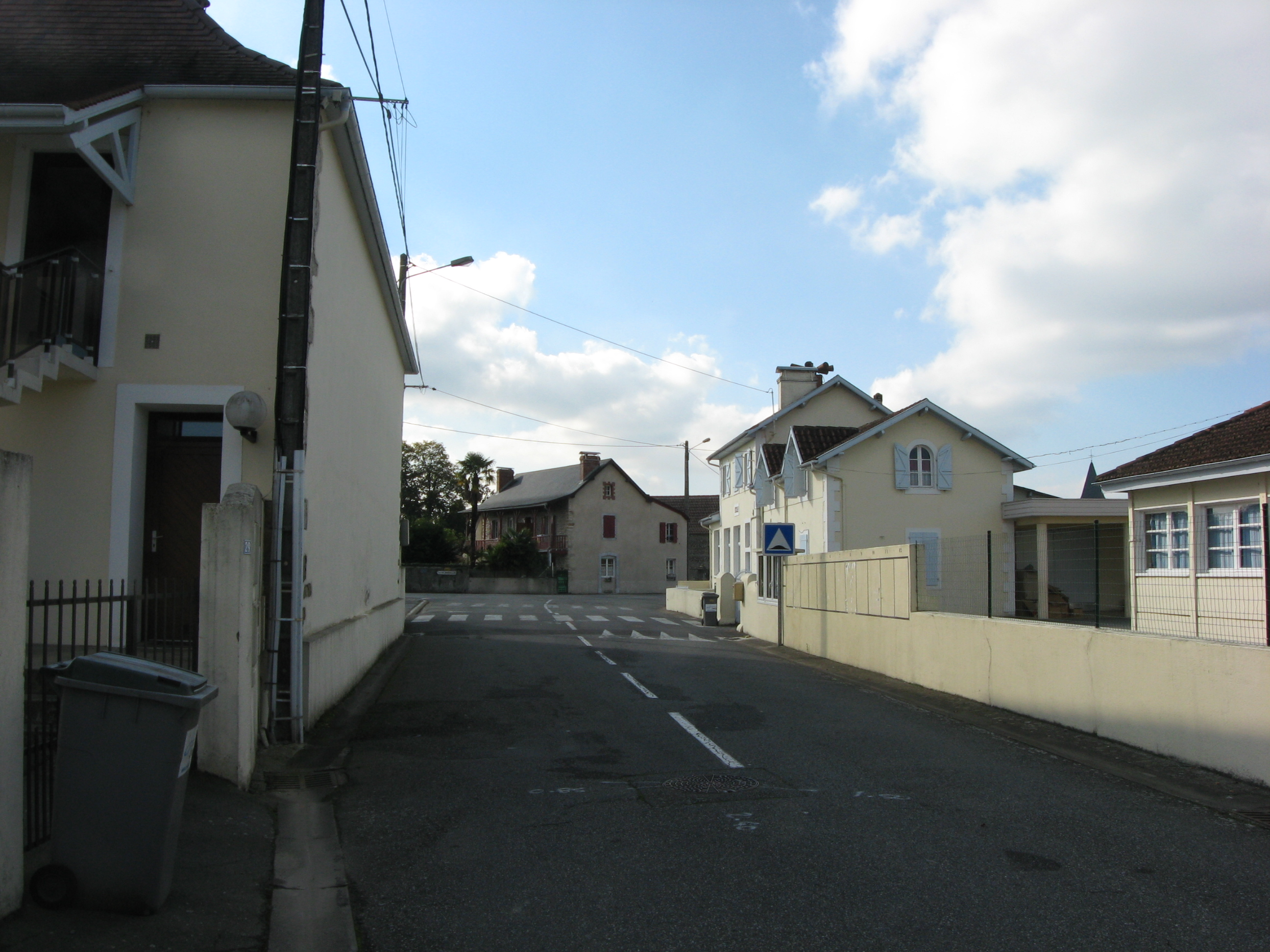
- A street in Abidos

- Coat of arms
- Location of Abidos
- Location within France Location within Nouvelle-Aquitaine
- Coordinates: 43°23′59″N 0°37′23″W
- Country: France
- Region: Nouvelle-Aquitaine
- Department: Pyrénées-Atlantiques
- Arrondissement: Pau
- Canton: Le Cœur de Béarn
- Intercommunality: Lacq-Orthez

Government
  - Mayor (2020–2026): Jean-Claude Mirassou
- Area^{1}: 3.06 km^{2} (1.18 sq mi)
- Elevation: 95 m (312 ft)
- Highest elevation: 170 m (560 ft)
- Lowest elevation: 86 m (282 ft)
- Population (2023): 222
  - Density: 72.5/km^{2} (188/sq mi)
- Time zone: UTC+01:00 (CET)
  - Summer (DST): UTC+02:00 (CEST)
- INSEE/Postal code: 64003 /64150
- ^{1} French Land Register data, which excludes lakes, ponds, glaciers > 1 km^{2} (0.386 sq mi or 247 acres) and river estuaries.

Abidos (French pronunciation: [abidɔs]; Occitan: Avidòs) is a commune in the Pyrénées-Atlantiques department in the Nouvelle-Aquitaine region in southwestern France.

== Geography ==
Abidos is a Béarnais commune located some 13 km south-east of Orthez and 4 km north of Mourenx on the south side of the Gave de Pau. Access to the commune is by the D31 road from Le Bourguet in the north turning west in the commune to access the village and continuing southwest to join the D9. The D33 road from Noguères in the southeast passes through the commune east of the village and joins the D31 as it turns west. The commune has an industrial area in the southwest with the rest of the commune mainly farmland.

The Gave de Pau forms the north-eastern border of the commune and also passes through the northern corner of the commune as it flows north-west to join the Gave d'Oloron at Peyrehorade. The Baïse river flows through the centre of the commune from the southeast and joins the Gave de Pau in the commune. The Luzoué also flows from the southeast through the west of the commune to join the Gave de Pau.

=== Places and hamlets ===
- Bastia
- Bernacheyre
- Chalosse
- Joanlong
- Pleasure
- Us

=== Toponymy ===
The name Abidos appears in the forms:

- Avitos in the 11th century, Pierre de Marca and around 1100 and in the Cartulary of the Abbey of Lucq.
- Avitoss was another form around 1100, Cartulary of the Abbey of Lucq-de-Béarn. *Avezos also appeared around 1100 in the Cartulary of the Abbey of Lucq-de-Béarn
- Avidoos in the 13th century in the Fors de Béarn
- Sent-Sadarnii of Abidos in 1344 Notaries of Pardies
- Bidos and Bydos in 1548, Reformation of Béarn
- Abidos on the Cassini Map of 1750

Michel Grosclaude offers a Latin etymology of Avitus plus the Aquitaine suffix -ossum "domain of Avitus".

Its name in Béarnais is Avidos (according to the classical norm).

== History ==
Paul Raymond notes that in 1385, Abidos had 18 fires and depended on the bailiwicks of Lagor and Pardies. Abidos had a castle with an attached door across the Pau river.

== Heraldry ==
Arms of Abidos	Blazon: Azure, the crested osprey in argent beaked and membered in gules, perched on a bone of death also argent posed in fess.

== Administration ==
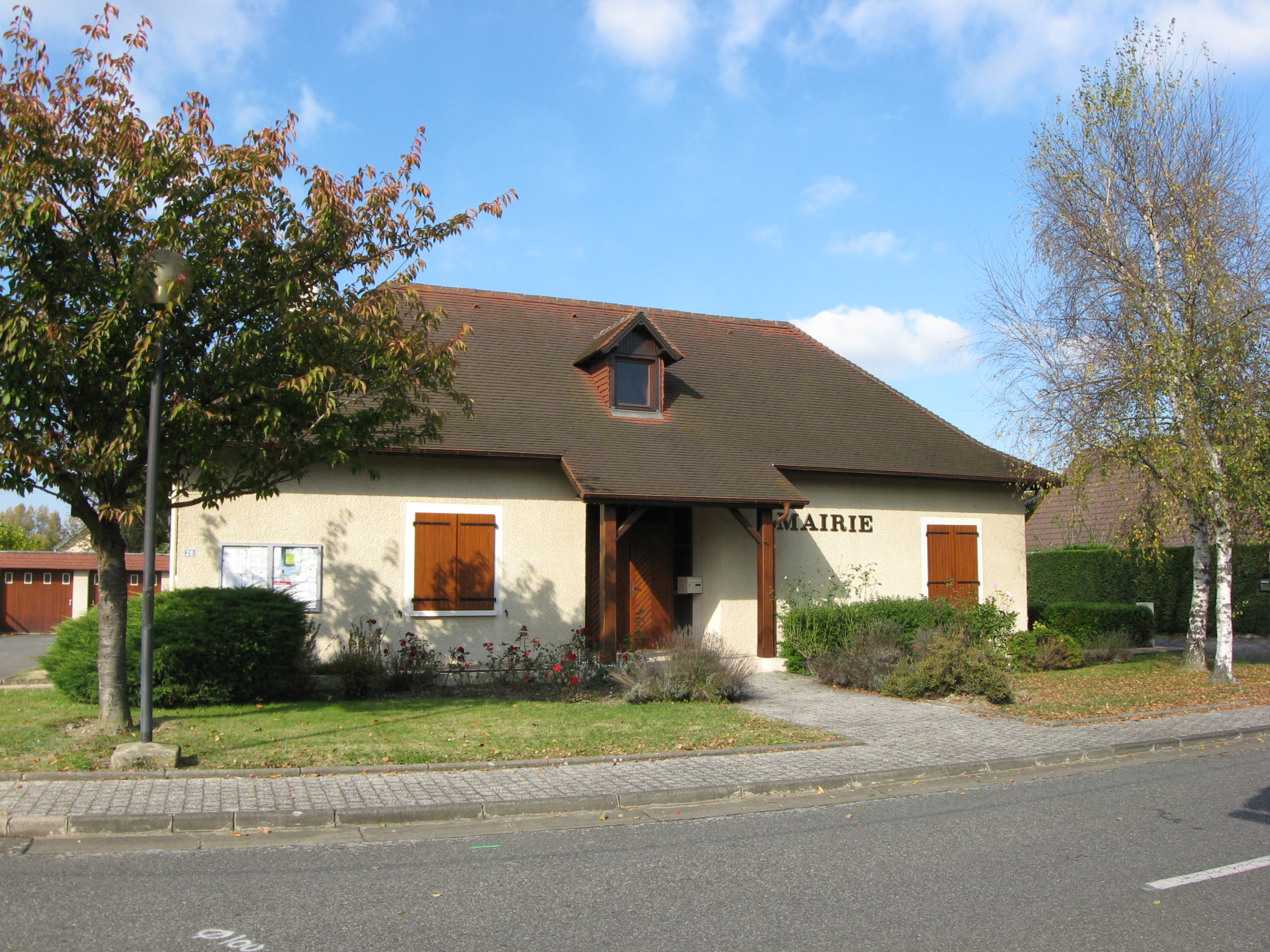
Abidos Town Hall

List of Successive Mayors of Abidos

From	To	Name	Party
1968	2008	Léon Guilhamélou-Sempé	UMP
2008	2026	Jean-Claude Mirassou	

=== Inter-communality ===
Abidos is a member of seven inter-communal organisations:

- the community of communes of Lacq-Orthez
- SIVU for the development and management of the river basin of Baïses
- AEP union for water and Baise;
- sanitation union of the communes of the Juscle and Baise valleys
- Energy Union of Pyrenees-Atlantiques
- Intercommunal Union for defence against floods of the Gave de Pau
- Intercommunal Union for educational regrouping in the communes of Os-Marsillon and Abidos.

== Population ==
Historical population

Year	Pop.	±% p.a.
1793	225	—
1821	241	+0.25%
1846	222	−0.33%
1872	208	−0.25%
1901	184	−0.42%
1926	162	−0.51%
1946	109	−1.96%
1954	147	+3.81%
1962	255	+7.13%

Year	Pop.	±% p.a.
1968	226	−1.99%
1975	184	−2.89%
1982	187	+0.23%
1990	188	+0.07%
1999	200	+0.69%
2007	230	+1.76%
2012	233	+0.26%
2017	226	−0.61%
2023	222	−0.30%

Source: EHESS and INSEE

== Economy ==
The town is part of the zone designation of Ossau-Iraty cheese.

== Culture and heritage ==
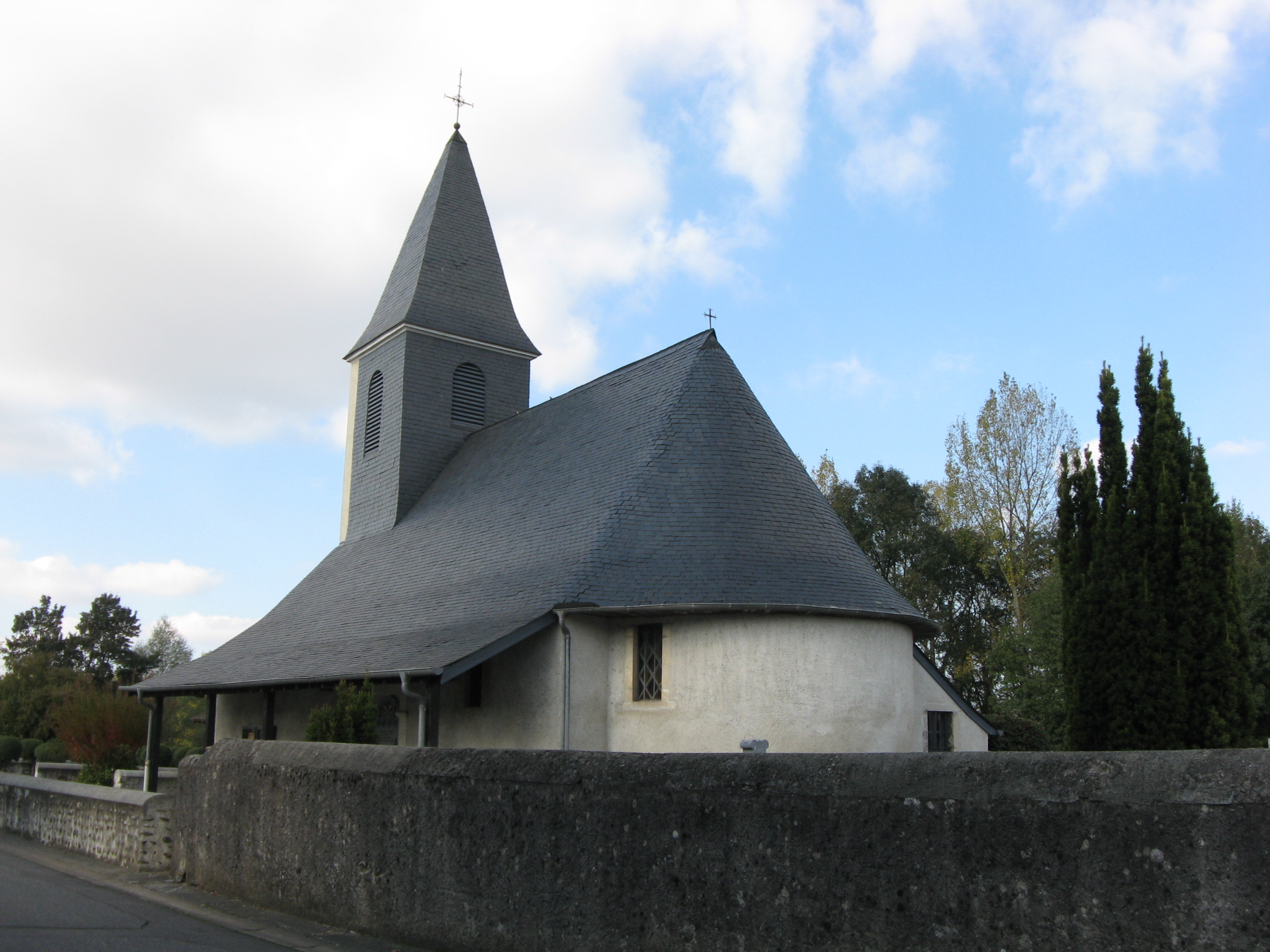
Abidos Church

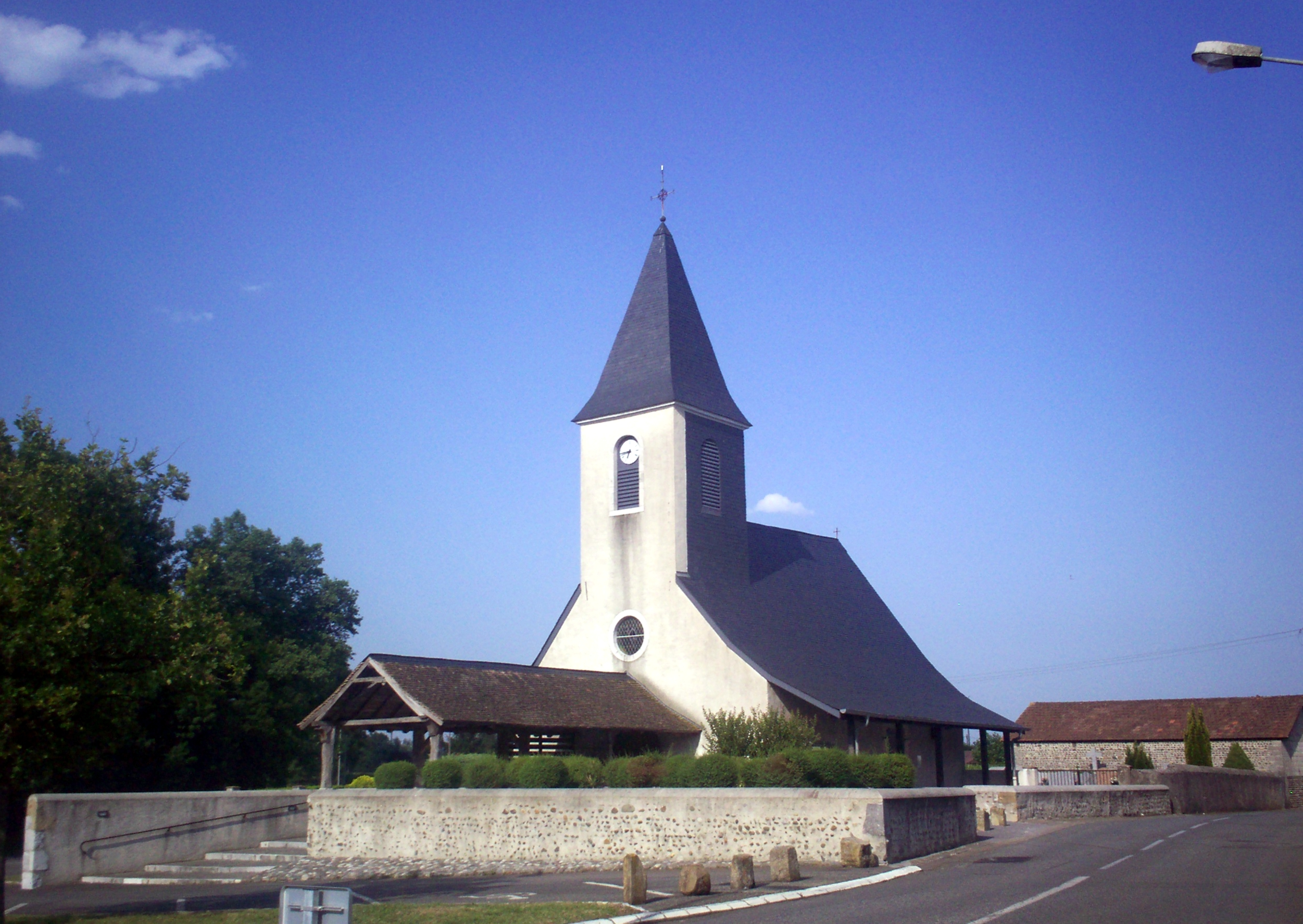
Front of the Church

=== Religious Heritage ===
There is an old chapel at Abidos castle.

=== Environmental heritage ===
An arboretum created by the community of communes of Lacq and the Abengoa BioEnergy France company, is located behind the village hall.

Also found in Abydos, a mill with its canal. The path of Naöu means an unencumbered way along the Pau river (phonetic transcription of nau is bateau in Béarnais).

== Facilities ==
=== Education ===
The commune has a school with two classrooms for primary school, a school canteen, and a library.

=== Sports and sports equipment ===
The town has a sports field in the centre with a football field, basketball court, volleyball court, and tennis courts. There is also a sports hall equipped for basketball, tennis and Basque pelota. Lastly there is a roller skate park for BMX edge of the Baise.

=== Notable People linked to the commune ===
- Raoul Vergez was born in Abidos on 3 August 1908 and died in Senlis (Oise) on 7 July 1977. He was a "companion carpenter", writer and journalist. Known by the name of "Béarnais, the friend of the Tour de France", he left an important mark on the work of the Companions in France. He reported from the United States during a trip in 1952, some special techniques for companion carpenters.

== See also ==
- Communes of the Pyrénées-Atlantiques department
