= Jowkar, Susan =

Jowkar جوكار
- Village
- Location within Iran
- Coordinates: 32°02′51″N 49°49′55″E
- Country: Iran
- Province: Khuzestan
- County: Izeh
- Bakhsh: Susan
- Rural District: Susan-e Gharbi

Population (2006)
  - Total: 132
- Time zone: UTC+3:30 (IRST)
  - Summer (DST): UTC+4:30 (IRDT)

Jowkar (Persian: جوكار, also Romanized as Jowkār; also known as Jowkār-e Mardom Dān) is a village in Susan-e Gharbi Rural District, Susan District, Izeh County, Khuzestan Province, Iran. At the 2006 census, its population was 132, in 23 families.
