= Baft =

City in Kerman province, Iran

Baft Persian: بافت
- City
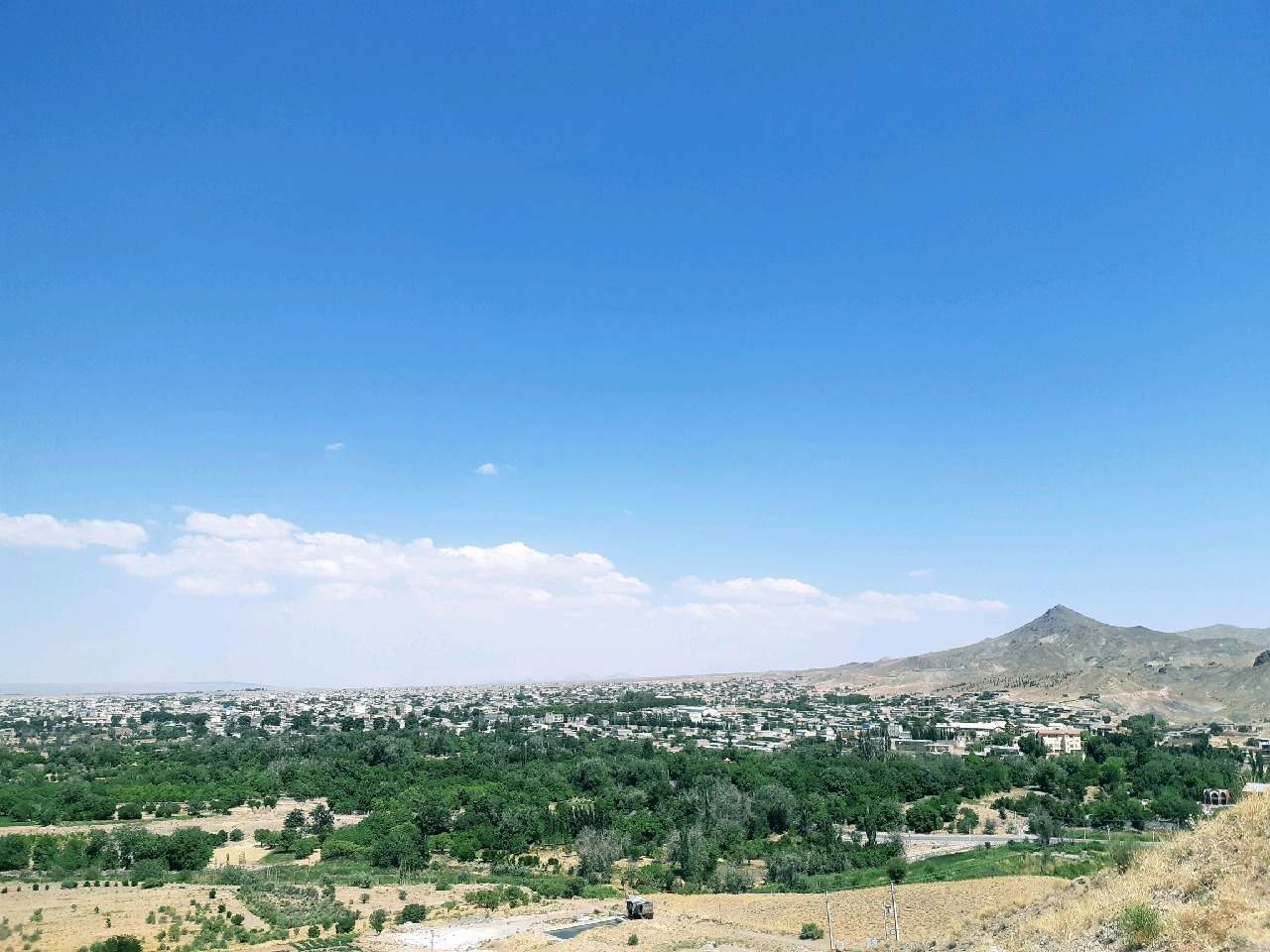

- Location within Iran
- Coordinates: 29°14′06″N 56°35′56″E
- Country: Iran
- Province: Kerman
- County: Baft
- District: Central
- Elevation: 2,280 m (7,480 ft)

Population (2016)
  - Total: 34,517
- Time zone: UTC+3:30 (IRST)
- Area code: 0347422

Baft (Persian: بافت) (Note: Also romanized as Bāft) is a city in the Central District of Baft County, Kerman province, Iran, serving as capital of both the county and the district. It is 155 kilometres (96 mi) southwest of Kerman. Baft has an elevation of about 2,280 metres (7,480 ft).

== Demographics ==
=== Population ===
At the time of the 2006 National Census, the city's population was 35,008 in 8,265 households. The following census in 2011 counted 33,107 people in 8,473 households. The 2016 census measured the population of the city as 34,517 people in 10,035 households.

== Climate ==
Baft has a cold semi-arid climate (BSk) according to the Köppen climate classification.

Climate data for Baft (1991–2020, extremes since 1989)
| Month | Jan | Feb | Mar | Apr | May | Jun | Jul | Aug | Sep | Oct | Nov | Dec | Year |
|---|---|---|---|---|---|---|---|---|---|---|---|---|---|
| Record high °C (°F) | 20.0 (68.0) | 22.4 (72.3) | 27.0 (80.6) | 27.4 (81.3) | 33.8 (92.8) | 37.0 (98.6) | 36.8 (98.2) | 36.6 (97.9) | 33.5 (92.3) | 28.9 (84.0) | 24.2 (75.6) | 24.0 (75.2) | 37.0 (98.6) |
| Mean daily maximum °C (°F) | 9.6 (49.3) | 11.5 (52.7) | 15.2 (59.4) | 20.6 (69.1) | 26.3 (79.3) | 31.1 (88.0) | 32.5 (90.5) | 31.3 (88.3) | 28.3 (82.9) | 23.0 (73.4) | 16.5 (61.7) | 12.5 (54.5) | 21.5 (70.7) |
| Daily mean °C (°F) | 3.5 (38.3) | 5.5 (41.9) | 9.1 (48.4) | 14.6 (58.3) | 20.2 (68.4) | 24.9 (76.8) | 26.2 (79.2) | 24.9 (76.8) | 21.9 (71.4) | 16.2 (61.2) | 9.8 (49.6) | 5.9 (42.6) | 15.2 (59.4) |
| Mean daily minimum °C (°F) | −1.6 (29.1) | 0.1 (32.2) | 3.5 (38.3) | 8.4 (47.1) | 13.2 (55.8) | 17.8 (64.0) | 19.8 (67.6) | 18.4 (65.1) | 15.2 (59.4) | 9.6 (49.3) | 3.7 (38.7) | 0.3 (32.5) | 9.0 (48.2) |
| Record low °C (°F) | −16.6 (2.1) | −11.6 (11.1) | −7.6 (18.3) | −2.0 (28.4) | 4.6 (40.3) | 9.5 (49.1) | 14.5 (58.1) | 12.6 (54.7) | 6.6 (43.9) | 2.8 (37.0) | −7.5 (18.5) | −10.6 (12.9) | −16.6 (2.1) |
| Average precipitation mm (inches) | 52.1 (2.05) | 53.1 (2.09) | 51.1 (2.01) | 24.1 (0.95) | 8.9 (0.35) | 1.8 (0.07) | 5.0 (0.20) | 11.2 (0.44) | 1.3 (0.05) | 4.9 (0.19) | 12.0 (0.47) | 33.5 (1.32) | 259.0 (10.20) |
| Average precipitation days (≥ 1.0 mm) | 4.8 | 5.1 | 5.5 | 3.5 | 1.7 | 0.3 | 1.1 | 1.9 | 0.5 | 1.0 | 2.0 | 3.3 | 30.7 |
| Average relative humidity (%) | 52.0 | 50.0 | 46.0 | 39.0 | 30.0 | 24.0 | 27.0 | 26.0 | 28.0 | 34.0 | 43.0 | 48.0 | 37.3 |
| Average dew point °C (°F) | −6.6 (20.1) | −5.4 (22.3) | −3.5 (25.7) | −0.6 (30.9) | 0.6 (33.1) | 1.8 (35.2) | 4.2 (39.6) | 2.8 (37.0) | 1.0 (33.8) | −0.7 (30.7) | −3.5 (25.7) | −5.9 (21.4) | −1.3 (29.7) |
| Mean monthly sunshine hours | 226 | 216 | 243 | 268 | 318 | 313 | 301 | 317 | 296 | 294 | 251 | 239 | 3,282 |
Source: NOAA, IRIMO

== Khabr National Park ==
Baft is one of the natural areas in Iran. Within its locale is the Khabr National Park, which has been submitted by Iran as a UNESCO world heritage site. Khabr National Park has a rich flora (about 750 species) and about 120 endemic species.
