= Megesi, Jiroft =

Megesi مگسي
- Village
- Location within Iran
- Coordinates: 28°35′55″N 57°44′23″E
- Country: Iran
- Province: Kerman
- County: Jiroft
- Bakhsh: Central
- Rural District: Halil

Population (2006)
  - Total: 310
- Time zone: UTC+3:30 (IRST)
  - Summer (DST): UTC+4:30 (IRDT)

Megesi (Persian: مگسي, also Romanized as Megesī and Magasī) is a village in Halil Rural District, in the Central District of Jiroft County, Kerman Province, Iran. At the 2006 census, its population was 310, in 63 families.
