= Sefteh, Bardsir =

Sefteh سفته
- Village
- Location within Iran
- Coordinates: 29°54′45″N 56°17′50″E
- Country: Iran
- Province: Kerman
- County: Bardsir
- Bakhsh: Central
- Rural District: Kuh Panj

Population (2006)
  - Total: 52
- Time zone: UTC+3:30 (IRST)
  - Summer (DST): UTC+4:30 (IRDT)

Sefteh (Persian: سفته, also Romanized as Softeh; also known as Sefteh Galū and Sofeh) is a village in Kuh Panj Rural District, in the Central District of Bardsir County, Kerman Province, Iran. At the 2006 census, its population was 52, in 14 families.
