= Sefteh-ye Hoseyn Khan =

Sefteh-ye Hoseyn Khan سفته حسين خان
- Village
- Location within Iran
- Coordinates: 29°44′05″N 56°58′11″E
- Country: Iran
- Province: Kerman
- County: Bardsir
- Bakhsh: Central
- Rural District: Golzar

Population (2006)
  - Total: 16
- Time zone: UTC+3:30 (IRST)
  - Summer (DST): UTC+4:30 (IRDT)

Sefteh-ye Hoseyn Khan (Persian: سفته حسين خان, also Romanized as Sefteh-ye Ḩoseyn Khān and Sefteh-e Ḩosein Khān; also known as Sefteh) is a village in Golzar Rural District, in the Central District of Bardsir County, Kerman Province, Iran. At the 2006 census, its population was 16, in 4 families.
