= Khabar District =

District in Kerman province, Iran

Khabar District Persian: بخش خبر
- District
- Location within Iran
- Coordinates: 28°52′24″N 56°30′19″E
- Country: Iran
- Province: Kerman
- County: Baft
- Capital: Kashkuiyeh

Population (2016)
  - Total: 16,012
- Time zone: UTC+3:30 (IRST)

Khabar District (Persian: بخش خبر) is in Baft County, Kerman province, Iran. Its capital is the village of Kashkuiyeh.

== History ==
After the 2006 National Census, Dashtab and Khabar Rural Districts were separated from the Central District in the formation of Khabar District.

== Demographics ==
=== Population ===
At the time of the 2011 census, the district's population was 15,902 people in 4,616 households. The 2016 census measured the population of the district as 16,012 inhabitants in 5,280 households.

=== Administrative divisions ===
Khabar District Population
Administrative Divisions	2011	2016
Dashtab RD	9,079	9,730
Khabar RD	6,823	6,282
Total	15,902	16,012
RD = Rural District
