= Dashtab Rural District =

Rural district in Kerman province, Iran

Dashtab Rural District Persian: دهستان دشتاب
- Rural District
- Location within Iran
- Coordinates: 28°53′40″N 56°38′37″E
- Country: Iran
- Province: Kerman
- County: Baft
- District: Khabar
- Capital: Kashkuiyeh

Population (2016)
  - Total: 9,730
- Time zone: UTC+3:30 (IRST)

Dashtab Rural District (Persian: دهستان دشتاب) is in Khabar District of Baft County, Kerman province, Iran. Its capital is the village of Kashkuiyeh.

== Demographics ==
=== Population ===
At the time of the 2006 National Census, the rural district's population (as a part of the Central District) was 5,170 in 1,144 households. There were 9,079 inhabitants in 2,608 households at the following census of 2011, by which time the rural district had been separated from the district in the establishment of Khabar District. The 2016 census measured the population of the rural district as 9,730 in 3,267 households. The most populous of its 141 villages was Kashkuiyeh, with 2,760 people.
