= Fathabad Rural District (Baft County) =

Rural district in Kerman province, Iran

Fathabad Rural District Persian: دهستان فتح آباد
- Rural District
- Location within Iran
- Coordinates: 29°14′23″N 56°22′04″E
- Country: Iran
- Province: Kerman
- County: Baft
- District: Central
- Capital: Bidkorduiyeh

Population (2016)
  - Total: 4,581
- Time zone: UTC+3:30 (IRST)

Fathabad Rural District (Persian: دهستان فتح آباد) is in the Central District of Baft County, Kerman province, Iran. Its capital is the village of Bidkorduiyeh.

== Demographics ==
=== Population ===
At the time of the 2006 National Census, the rural district's population was 3,343 in 836 households. There were 3,613 inhabitants in 1,088 households at the following census of 2011. The 2016 census measured the population of the rural district as 4,581 in 1,559 households. The most populous of its 124 villages was Bidkorduiyeh, with 445 people.
