= Khabar Rural District (Baft County) =

Rural district in Kerman province, Iran

Khabar Rural District Persian: دهستان خبر
- Rural District
- Location within Iran
- Coordinates: 28°51′29″N 56°16′03″E
- Country: Iran
- Province: Kerman
- County: Baft
- District: Khabar
- Capital: Khabar

Population (2016)
  - Total: 6,282
- Time zone: UTC+3:30 (IRST)

Khabar Rural District (Persian: دهستان خبر) is in Khabar District of Baft County, Kerman province, Iran. Its capital is the village of Khabar.

== Demographics ==
=== Population ===
At the time of the 2006 National Census, the rural district's population (as a part of the Central District) was 4,842 in 1,123 households. There were 6,823 inhabitants in 2,008 households at the following census of 2011, by which time the rural district had been separated from the district in the establishment of Khabar District. The 2016 census measured the population of the rural district as 6,282 in 2,013 households. The most populous of its 66 villages was Khabar, with 2,634 people.
