= Kiskan Rural District =

Rural district in Kerman province, Iran

Kiskan Rural District Persian: دهستان كيسكان
- Rural District
- Location within Iran
- Coordinates: 29°21′18″N 56°38′35″E
- Country: Iran
- Province: Kerman
- County: Baft
- District: Central
- Capital: Karin

Population (2016)
  - Total: 6,682
- Time zone: UTC+3:30 (IRST)

Kiskan Rural District (Persian: دهستان كيسكان) is in the Central District of Baft County, Kerman province, Iran. Its capital is the village of Karin.

== Demographics ==
=== Population ===
At the time of the 2006 National Census, the rural district's population was 2,472 in 720 households. There were 4,920 inhabitants in 1,532 households at the following census of 2011. The 2016 census measured the population of the rural district as 6,682 in 2,219 households. The most populous of its 74 villages was Karin, with 735 people.
