= Bezenjan Rural District =

Rural district in Kerman province, Iran

Bezenjan Rural District Persian: دهستان بزنجان
- Rural District
- Location within Iran
- Coordinates: 29°08′46″N 56°42′07″E
- Country: Iran
- Province: Kerman
- County: Baft
- District: Central
- Capital: Bezenjan

Population (2016)
  - Total: 9,959
- Time zone: UTC+3:30 (IRST)

Bezenjan Rural District (Persian: دهستان بزنجان) is in the Central District of Baft County, Kerman province, Iran. It is administered from the city of Bezenjan.

== Demographics ==
=== Population ===
At the time of the 2006 National Census, the rural district's population was 6,279 in 1,473 households. There were 7,634 inhabitants in 2,304 households at the following census of 2011. The 2016 census measured the population of the rural district as 9,959 in 3,266 households. The most populous of its 144 villages was Bongan, with 1,113 people.
