= Gughar Rural District =

Rural district in Kerman province, Iran

Gughar Rural District Persian: دهستان گوغر
- Rural District
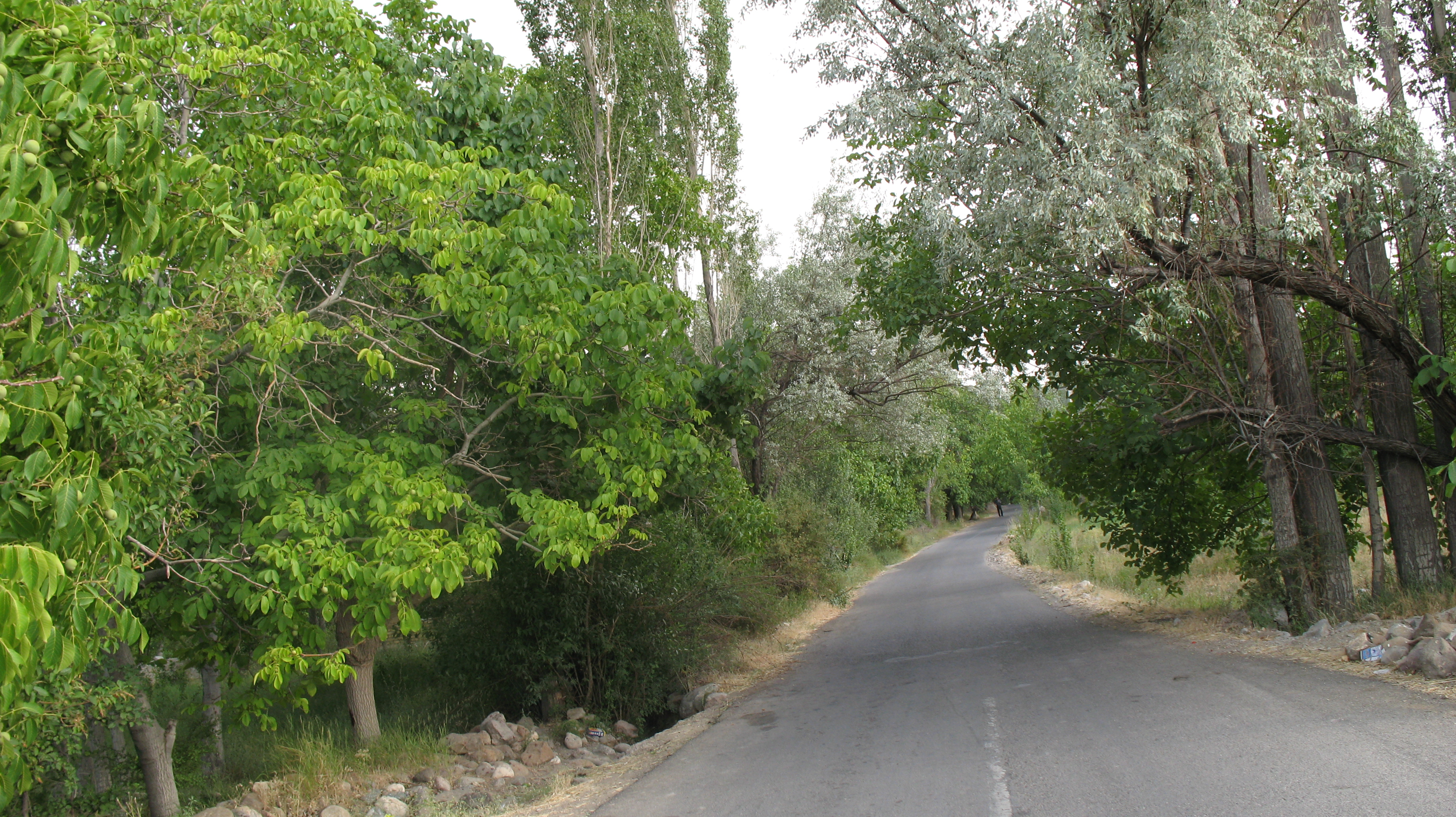
- A road in Gughar Rural District

- Location within Iran
- Coordinates: 29°28′40″N 56°25′32″E
- Country: Iran
- Province: Kerman
- County: Baft
- District: Central
- Capital: Amirabad

Population (2016)
  - Total: 7,264
- Time zone: UTC+3:30 (IRST)

Gughar Rural District (Persian: دهستان گوغر) is in the Central District of Baft County, Kerman province, Iran. Its capital is the village of Amirabad.

== Demographics ==
=== Population ===
At the time of the 2006 National Census, the rural district's population was 3,212 in 847 households. There were 5,604 inhabitants in 1,830 households at the following census of 2011. The 2016 census measured the population of the rural district as 7,264 in 2,528 households. The most populous of its 186 villages was Amirabad, with 1,621 people.
