= Central District (Baft County) =

District in Kerman province, Iran

Central District (Baft County) Persian: بخش مرکزی شهرستان بافت
- District
- Location within Iran
- Coordinates: 29°14′27″N 56°31′53″E
- Country: Iran
- Province: Kerman
- County: Baft
- Capital: Baft

Population (2016)
  - Total: 67,520
- Time zone: UTC+3:30 (IRST)

The Central District of Baft County (Persian: بخش مرکزی شهرستان بافت) is in Kerman province, Iran. Its capital is the city of Baft.

== History ==
After the 2006 National Census, Dehsard Rural District was separated from the district in the establishment of Arzuiyeh County, and Dashtab and Khabar Rural Districts were separated from it in the formation of Khabar District.

== Demographics ==
=== Population ===
At the time of the 2006 census, the district's population was 68,270 in 16,394 households. The following census in 2011 counted 59,112 people in 16,356 households. The 2016 census measured the population of the district as 67,520 inhabitants in 21,051 households.

=== Administrative divisions ===
Central District (Baft County) Population
Administrative Divisions	2006	2011	2016
Bezenjan RD	6,279	7,834	9,959
Dashtab RD (Note: Transferred to Khabar District)	5,170		
Dehsard RD (Note: Transferred to Arzuiyeh County)	3,527		
Fathabad RD	3,343	3,613	4,581
Gughar RD	3,212	5,604	7,264
Khabar RD	4,842		
Kiskan RD	2,472	4,920	6,682
Baft (city)	35,008	33,107	34,517
Bezenjan (city)	4,417	4,034	4,517
Total	68,270	59,112	67,520
RD = Rural District
