= Baft County =

County in Kerman province, Iran

Baft County Persian: شهرستان بافت
- County
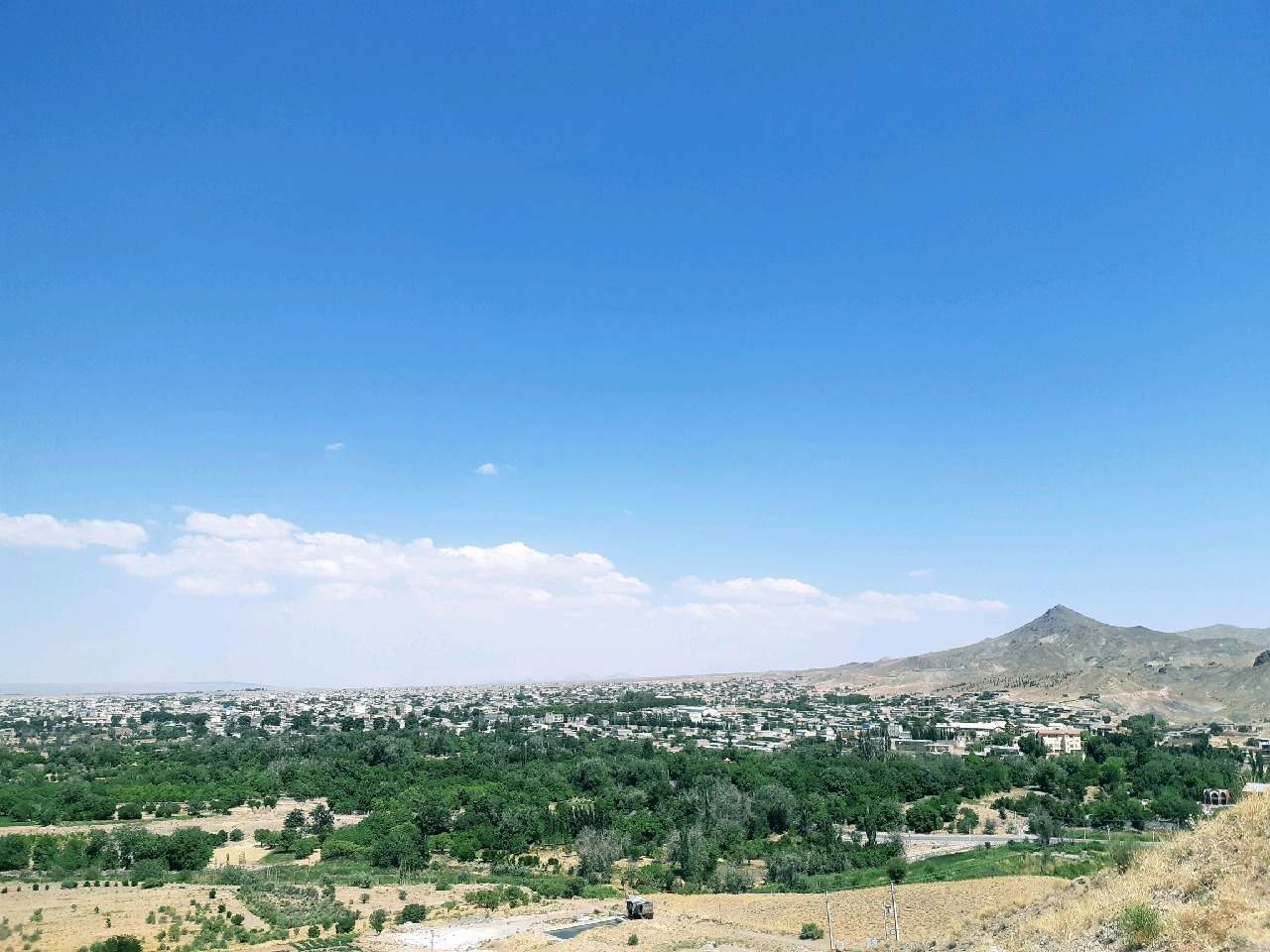
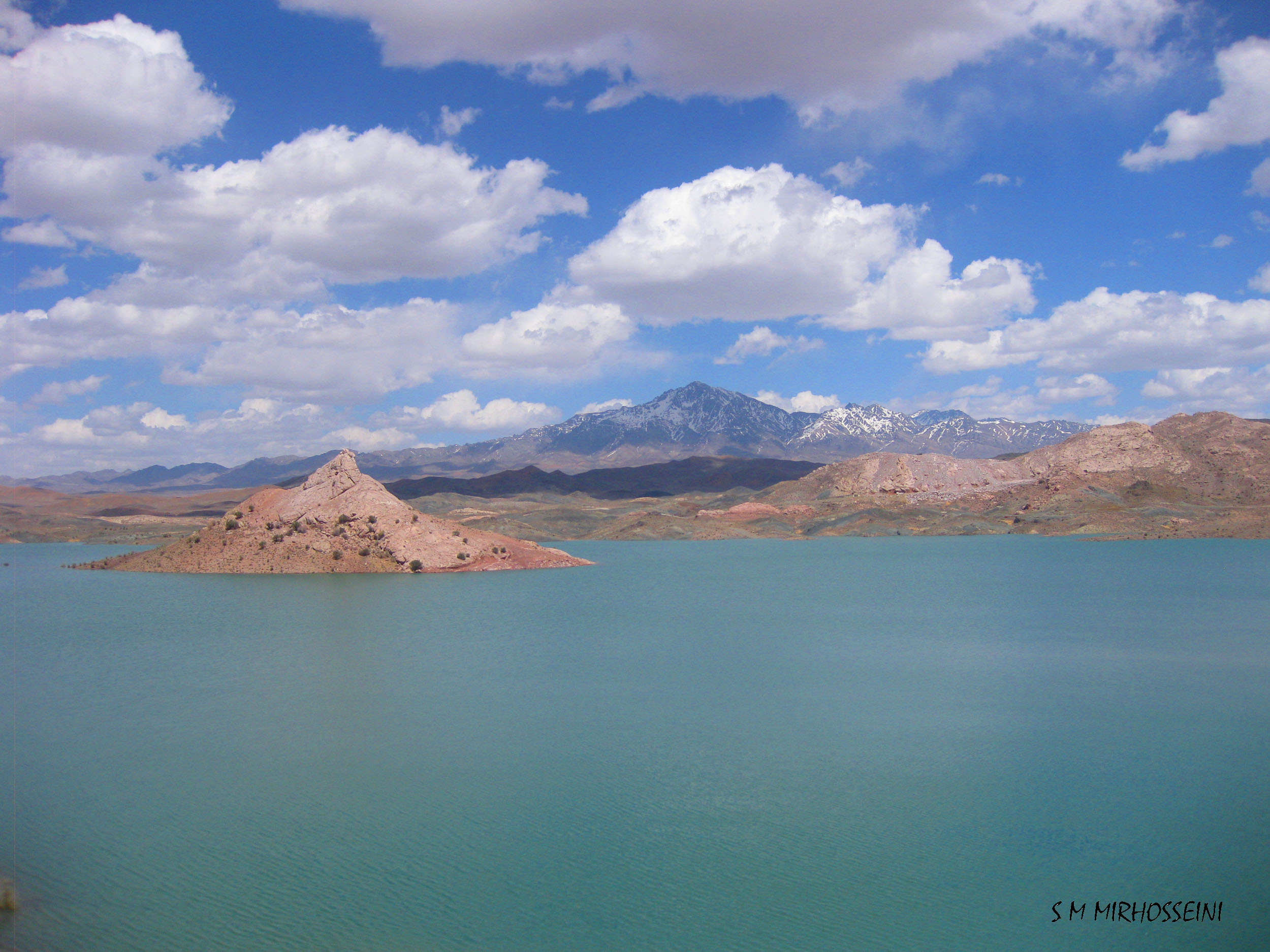
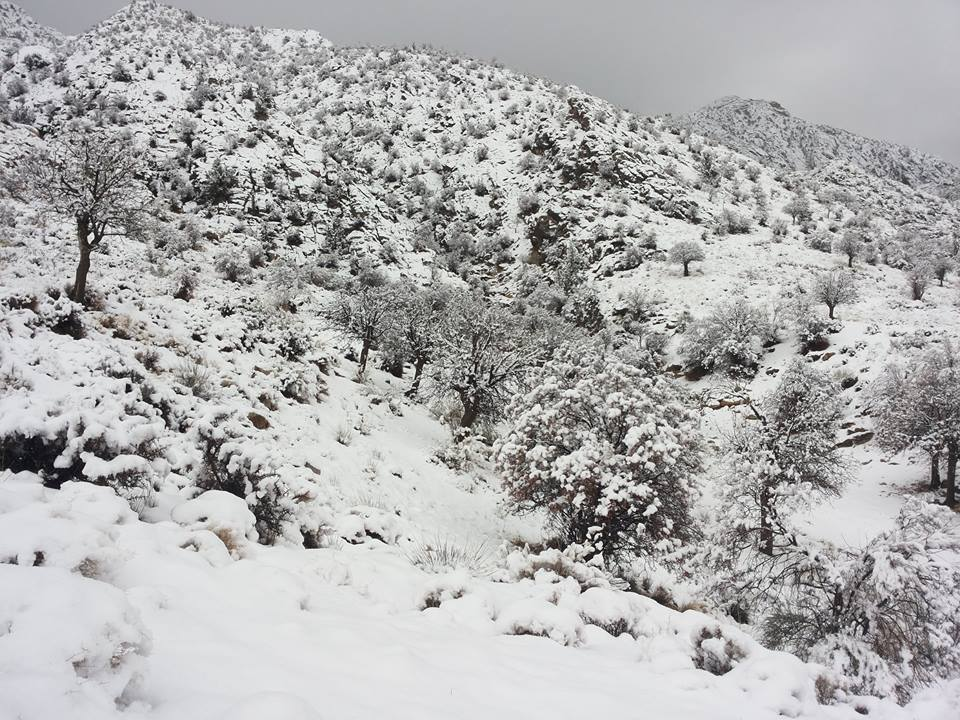
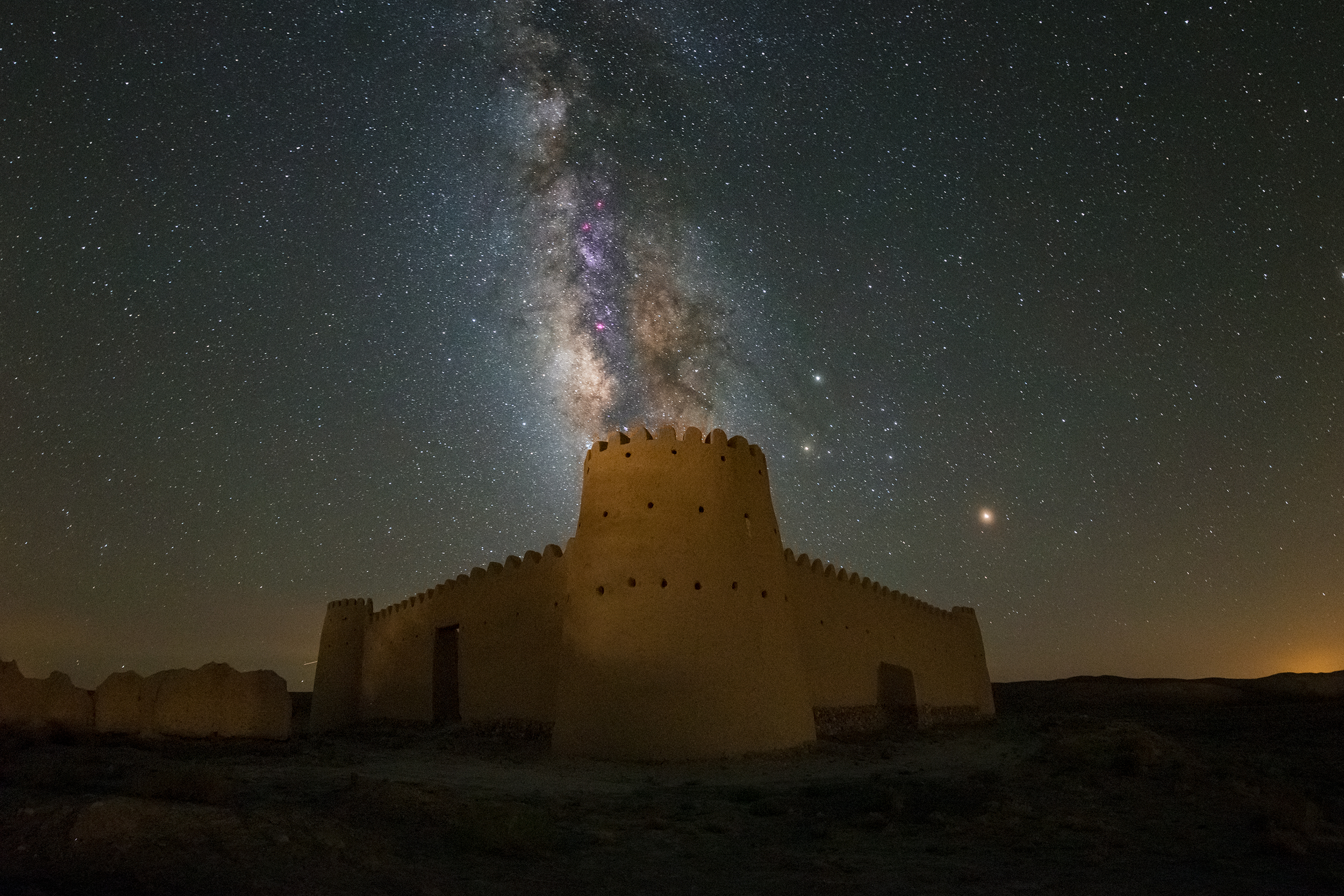
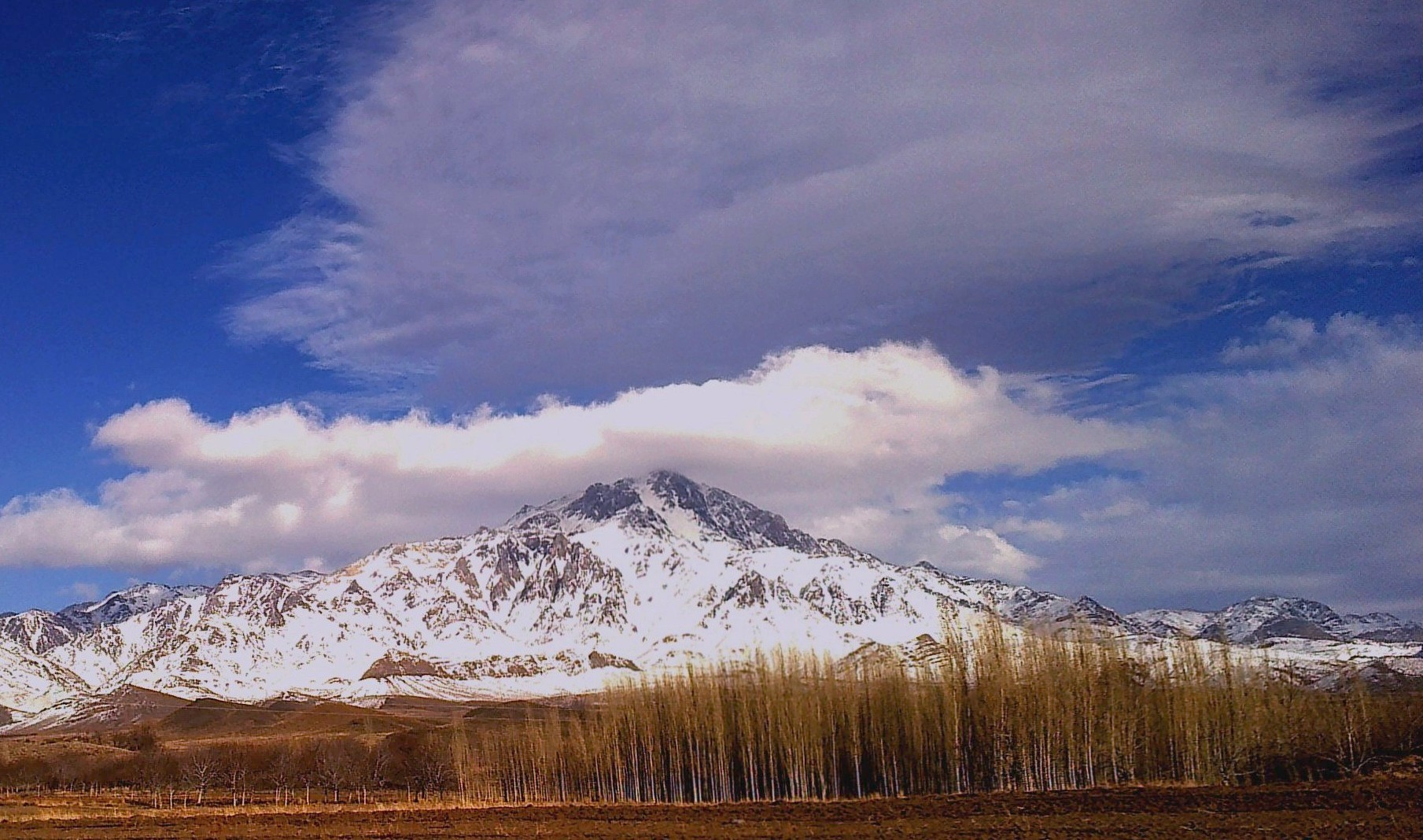

- Location of Baft County in Kerman province (center left, yellow)

- Location of Kerman province in Iran
- Coordinates: 29°10′N 56°30′E
- Country: Iran
- Province: Kerman
- Capital: Baft
- Districts: Central, Khabar

Population (2016)
  - Total: 84,103
- Time zone: UTC+3:30 (IRST)

Baft County (Persian: شهرستان بافت) is in Kerman province, Iran. Its capital is the city of Baft.

== History ==
After the 2006 National Census, Arzuiyeh District and Dehsard Rural District were separated from the county in the establishment of Arzuiyeh County, and Rabor District to establish Rabor County. Dashtab and Khabar Rural Districts were separated from the Central District in the formation of Khabar District.

== Demographics ==
=== Population ===
At the time of the 2006 census, the county's population was 138,847, in 32,262 households. The following census in 2011 counted 75,940 people in 21,195 households. The 2016 census measured the population of the county as 84,103 in 26,543 households.

=== Administrative divisions ===
Baft County's population history and administrative structure over three consecutive censuses are shown in the following table.

Baft County Population
Administrative Divisions	2006	2011	2016
Central District	68,270	59,112	67,520
Bezenjan RD	6,279	7,834	9,959
Dashtab RD	5,170		
Dehsard RD (Note: Transferred to Arzuiyeh County)	3,527		
Fathabad RD	3,343	3,613	4,581
Gughar RD	3,212	5,604	7,264
Khabar RD	4,842		
Kiskan RD	2,472	4,920	6,682
Baft (city)	35,008	33,107	34,517
Bezenjan (city)	4,417	4,034	4,517
Arzuiyeh District	36,859		
Arzuiyeh RD	13,656		
Soghan RD	9,749		
Vakilabad RD	7,786		
Arzuiyeh (city)	5,668		
Khabar District		15,902	16,012
Dashtab RD		9,079	9,730
Khabar RD		6,823	6,282
Rabor District (Note: Transferred to Rabor County)	33,718		
Hanza RD	6,193		
Javaran RD	5,068		
Rabor RD	4,562		
Siyahbanuiyeh RD	5,509		
Rabor (city)	12,386		
Total	138,847	75,940	84,103
RD = Rural District

== Geography ==
The elevation of the county is 2,280 to 2,315m. Baft is one of highest counties in Iran and some areas have elevations reaching 2,800m. There are high mountains in Baft, some over 4,300m.

== See also ==
Media related to Baft County at Wikimedia Commons
