= Ceder =

Origin
- Languages: Zeder, Zederbaum, Cederberg, Cederblad, Cederblom, Cederbratt, Cedergren (surname), Cederholm, Cederlöf, Cederlund, Cederqvist, Erez (surname), Arazi (surname)
- Meaning: cedar
- Region of origin: Sweden, Finland, Poland

Ceder is a surname. Notable people with the surname include:

- Don Ceder, Dutch politician
- Jurgen Ceder, Belgian politician
- Naomi Ceder, American software developer
- Ralph Ceder (1898–1951), American film director and writer
- Ulf Ceder (born 1974), Finnish darts player
