= Arazi =

Arazi may refer to:

== Places ==
- Arazi Bahirchar Ghoshkati, village in Barisal District in the Barisal Division of southern-central Bangladesh
- Arazi Gobindapur, village in Jhalokati District in the Barisal Division of southern-central Bangladesh
- Arazi Kalikapur, village in Barisal District in the Barisal Division of southern-central Bangladesh
- Arazi, Isfahan, village in Isfahan Province, Iran
- Arazi-ye Qaleh Now, village in Kerman Province, Iran
- Arazi Masnali, town in the Islamabad Capital Territory of Pakistan
- A medieval town Arazi, near Ray, Iran (Rhagae)

== Other uses ==
- Arazi (horse)
- Arazi (surname)
