= Padeh =

Padeh or Pedeh (Persian: پده) may refer to:

== Places ==
=== Afghanistan ===
- Padeh-ye Nowkdari, village
- Padeh-ye Laghari, village

=== Iran ===
- Pedeh, Arzuiyeh, village in Kerman Province
- Padeh, Kohgiluyeh and Boyer-Ahmad, villages

== People ==
- Baruch Padeh (b. Padersky; 1908-2001), Israeli physician, Chief Medical Officer of the IDF, director of hospital named after him, Director General of the Ministry of Health, Israel Prize laureate
