= Amirabad-e Yek =

Village in Kerman province, Iran

Amirabad-e Yek Persian: اميراباد1
- Village
- Location within Iran
- Coordinates: 28°20′53″N 56°55′18″E
- Country: Iran
- Province: Kerman
- County: Arzuiyeh
- District: Soghan
- Rural District: Amirabad

Population (2016)
  - Total: 340
- Time zone: UTC+3:30 (IRST)

Amirabad-e Yek (Persian: 1اميرآباد) (Note: Also romanized as Amīrābād-e Yek; also known as Amīrābād) is a village in, and the capital of, Amirabad Rural District of Soghan District, Arzuiyeh County, Kerman province, Iran.

== Demographics ==
=== Population ===
At the time of the 2006 National Census, the village's population was 242 in 45 households, when it was in Soghan Rural District of the former Arzuiyeh District of Baft County. The following census in 2011 counted 171 people in 48 households, by which time the district had been separated from the county in the establishment of Arzuiyeh County. The rural district was transferred to the new Soghan District, and Amirabad-e Yek was transferred to Amirabad Rural District created in the district. The 2016 census measured the population of the village as 340 people in 104 households.
