= Ebrahimabad, Arzuiyeh =

Village in Kerman province, Iran

Ebrahimabad Persian: ابراهيم اباد
- Village
- Location within Iran
- Coordinates: 28°21′08″N 56°53′32″E
- Country: Iran
- Province: Kerman
- County: Arzuiyeh
- District: Soghan
- Rural District: Amirabad

Population (2016)
  - Total: 452
- Time zone: UTC+3:30 (IRST)

Ebrahimabad (Persian: ابراهيم اباد) (Note: Also romanized as Ebrāhīmābād; also known as Ebrahim Abad Arzoo” eyeh and Ebrāhīmābād-e Arzu”īyeh) is a village in Amirabad Rural District of Soghan District, Arzuiyeh County, Kerman province, Iran.

== Demographics ==
=== Population ===
At the time of the 2006 National Census, the village's population was 553 in 108 households, when it was in Soghan Rural District of the former Arzuiyeh District of Baft County. The following census in 2011 counted 426 people in 108 households, by which time the district had been separated from the county in the establishment of Arzuiyeh County. The rural district was transferred to the new Soghan District, and Ebrahimabad was transferred to Amirabad Rural District created in the district. The 2016 census measured the population of the village as 452 people in 120 households. It was the most populous village in its rural district.
