= Galu Anar =

Galu Anar گلوانار
- Village
- Location within Iran
- Coordinates: 28°37′42″N 56°48′14″E
- Country: Iran
- Province: Kerman
- County: Arzuiyeh
- Bakhsh: Central
- Rural District: Dehsard

Population (2006)
  - Total: 36
- Time zone: UTC+3:30 (IRST)
  - Summer (DST): UTC+4:30 (IRDT)

Galu Anar (Persian: گلوانار, also Romanized as Galū Anār) is a village in Dehsard Rural District, in the Central District of Arzuiyeh County, Kerman Province, Iran. At the 2006 census, its population was 36, in 10 families.
