= Soltan Ab Rural Cooperative =

Soltan Ab Rural Cooperative شركت تعاوني توليدروستائي سلطان اب
- Village
- Country: Iran
- Province: Kerman
- County: Arzuiyeh
- Bakhsh: Central
- Rural District: Vakilabad

Population (2006)
  - Total: 32
- Time zone: UTC+3:30 (IRST)
  - Summer (DST): UTC+4:30 (IRDT)

Soltan Ab Rural Cooperative (Persian: شركت تعاوني توليدروستائي سلطان اب – Sherket-e Tʿāvanī Tūlīd Rūstāyī-ye Solṭān Āb) is a village in Vakilabad Rural District, in the Central District of Arzuiyeh County, Kerman Province, Iran. At the 2006 census, its population was 32, in 11 families.
