= Sheykh Abdollah =

Sheykh Abdollah شيخ عبدالله
- Village
- Country: Iran
- Province: Kerman
- County: Arzuiyeh
- Bakhsh: Central
- Rural District: Arzuiyeh

Population (2006)
  - Total: 46
- Time zone: UTC+3:30 (IRST)
  - Summer (DST): UTC+4:30 (IRDT)

Sheykh Abdollah (Persian: شيخ عبدالله, also Romanized as Sheykh ʿAbdollah) is a village in Arzuiyeh Rural District, in the Central District of Arzuiyeh County, Kerman Province, Iran. At the 2006 census, its population was 46, in 10 families.
