= Bid-e Estakhr =

Bid-e Estakhr بيد استخر
- Village
- Country: Iran
- Province: Kerman
- County: Arzuiyeh
- Bakhsh: Soghan
- Rural District: Soghan

Population (2006)
  - Total: 51
- Time zone: UTC+3:30 (IRST)
  - Summer (DST): UTC+4:30 (IRDT)

Bid-e Estakhr (Persian: بيد استخر, also Romanized as Bīd-e Estakhr) is a village in Soghan Rural District, Soghan District, Arzuiyeh County, Kerman Province, Iran. At the 2006 census, its population was 51, in 14 families.
