= Bagh-e Yas =

Bagh-e Yas باغ ياس
- Village
- Location within Iran
- Coordinates: 28°34′13″N 56°52′33″E
- Country: Iran
- Province: Kerman
- County: Arzuiyeh
- Bakhsh: Central
- Rural District: Dehsard

Population (2006)
  - Total: 95
- Time zone: UTC+3:30 (IRST)
  - Summer (DST): UTC+4:30 (IRDT)

Bagh-e Yas (Persian: باغ ياس, also Romanized as Bāgh-e Yās) is a village in Dehsard Rural District, in the Central District of Arzuiyeh County, Kerman Province, Iran. At the 2006 census, its population was 95, in 23 families.
