= Razdar =

Razdar (Persian: رزدر or رزدار) may refer to:

- Razdar, Gilan (رزدار - Razdār)
- Razdar, Ahmadi (رزدر - Razdar), Hajjiabad County, Hormozgan Province
- Razdar, Arzuiyeh (رزدر - Razdar), Kerman Province
- Razdar, Rigan (رزدر - Razdar), Kerman Province
- Razdar, Lorestan (رزدر - Razdar)
