= Bagh Borj =

Bagh Borj باغ برج
- Village
- Location within Iran
- Coordinates: 28°31′18″N 57°02′54″E
- Country: Iran
- Province: Kerman
- County: Arzuiyeh
- Bakhsh: Soghan
- Rural District: Soghan

Population (2006)
  - Total: 118
- Time zone: UTC+3:30 (IRST)
  - Summer (DST): UTC+4:30 (IRDT)

Bagh Borj (Persian: باغ برج, also Romanized as Bāgh Borj) is a village in Soghan Rural District, Soghan District, Arzuiyeh County, Kerman Province, Iran. At the 2006 census, its population was 118, in 24 families.
