= Vakilabad, Arzuiyeh =

Village in Kerman province, Iran

Vakilabad Persian: وكيل اباد
- Village
- Location within Iran
- Coordinates: 28°28′14″N 56°06′11″E
- Country: Iran
- Province: Kerman
- County: Arzuiyeh
- District: Central
- Rural District: Vakilabad

Population (2016)
  - Total: 2,537
- Time zone: UTC+3:30 (IRST)

Vakilabad (Persian: وكيل اباد) (Note: Also romanized as Vakīlābād) is a village in, and the capital of, Vakilabad Rural District of the Central District of Arzuiyeh County, Kerman province, Iran.

== Demographics ==
=== Population ===
At the time of the 2006 National Census, the village's population was 4,010 in 859 households, when it was in the former Arzuiyeh District of Baft County. The following census in 2011 counted 3,520 people in 836 households, by which time the district had been separated from the county in the establishment of Arzuiyeh County. The rural district was transferred to the new Central District. The 2016 census measured the population of the village as 2,537 people in 712 households. It was the most populous village in its rural district.
