= Dowlatabad, Arzuiyeh =

Village in Kerman province, Iran

Dowlatabad Persian: دولت اباد
- Village
- Location within Iran
- Coordinates: 28°19′09″N 56°38′34″E
- Country: Iran
- Province: Kerman
- County: Arzuiyeh
- District: Central
- Rural District: Arzuiyeh

Population (2016)
  - Total: 3,111
- Time zone: UTC+3:30 (IRST)

Dowlatabad (Persian: دولت اباد) (Note: Also romanized as Daulatābad and Dowlatābād; also known as Dowlatābād Arzoo’eyeh, Dowlatābād Esfandaqeh, and Dowlatābād-e Arzū’tābād) is a village in Arzuiyeh Rural District of the Central District of Arzuiyeh County, Kerman province, Iran.

== Demographics ==
=== Population ===
At the time of the 2006 National Census, the village's population was 2,462 in 578 households, when it was in the former Arzuiyeh District of Baft County. The following census in 2011 counted 4,021 people in 1,106 households, by which time the district had been separated from the county in the establishment of Arzuiyeh County. The rural district was transferred to the new Central District. The 2016 census measured the population of the village as 3,111 people in 973 households. It was the most populous village in its rural district.
