= Emamzadeh Zakaria =

Emamzadeh Zakaria امامزاده زكريا
- Village
- Location within Iran
- Coordinates: 28°17′10″N 56°53′32″E
- Country: Iran
- Province: Kerman
- County: Arzuiyeh
- Bakhsh: Soghan
- Rural District: Soghan

Population (2006)
  - Total: 35
- Time zone: UTC+3:30 (IRST)
  - Summer (DST): UTC+4:30 (IRDT)

Emamzadeh Zakaria (Persian: امامزاده زكريا, also Romanized as Emāmzādeh Zakarīā; also known as Emāmzādeh Ḩaẕrat-e Zakarīā) is a village in Soghan Rural District, Soghan District, Arzuiyeh County, Kerman Province, Iran. At the 2006 census, its population was 35, in 11 families.
