= Sangabad =

Sangabad (Persian: سنگ اباد) may refer to:

- Sangabad, Ardabil
- Sangabad, Arzuiyeh, Kerman Province
- Sangabad, Rigan, Kerman Province
- Sangabad, South Khorasan
