= Parnatabad =

Parnatabad پرنت اباد
- Village
- Location within Iran
- Coordinates: 28°29′28″N 56°52′58″E
- Country: Iran
- Province: Kerman
- County: Arzuiyeh
- Bakhsh: Soghan
- Rural District: Soghan

Population (2006)
  - Total: 34
- Time zone: UTC+3:30 (IRST)
  - Summer (DST): UTC+4:30 (IRDT)

Parnatabad (Persian: پرنت اباد, also Romanized as Parnatābād) is a village in Soghan Rural District, Soghan District, Arzuiyeh County, Kerman Province, Iran. At the 2006 census, its population was 34, in 8 families.
