= Deh Gusheh =

Deh Gusheh ده گوشه
- Village
- Location within Iran
- Coordinates: 28°20′08″N 56°56′34″E
- Country: Iran
- Province: Kerman
- County: Arzuiyeh
- Bakhsh: Soghan
- Rural District: Soghan

Population (2006)
  - Total: 186
- Time zone: UTC+3:30 (IRST)
  - Summer (DST): UTC+4:30 (IRDT)

Deh Gusheh (Persian: ده گوشه, also Romanized as Deh Gūsheh) is a village in Soghan Rural District, Soghan District, Arzuiyeh County, Kerman Province, Iran. At the 2006 census, its population was 186, in 34 families.
