= Darreh Murti =

Darreh Murti دره مورتي
- Village
- Location within Iran
- Coordinates: 28°28′04″N 56°52′21″E
- Country: Iran
- Province: Kerman
- County: Arzuiyeh
- Bakhsh: Soghan
- Rural District: Soghan

Population (2006)
  - Total: 36
- Time zone: UTC+3:30 (IRST)
  - Summer (DST): UTC+4:30 (IRDT)

Darreh Murti (Persian: دره مورتي, also Romanized as Darreh Mūrtī; also known as Darreh Mūrdī) is a village in Soghan Rural District, Soghan District, Arzuiyeh County, Kerman Province, Iran. At the 2006 census, its population was 36, in 13 families.
