= Ab Garuiyeh =

Ab Garuiyeh ابگروييه
- Village
- Country: Iran
- Province: Kerman
- County: Arzuiyeh
- Bakhsh: Central
- Rural District: Dehsard

Population (2006)
  - Total: 44
- Time zone: UTC+3:30 (IRST)
  - Summer (DST): UTC+4:30 (IRDT)

Ab Garuiyeh (Persian: ابگروييه, also Romanized as Āb Garūīyeh) is a village in Dehsard Rural District, in the Central District of Arzuiyeh County, Kerman Province, Iran. At the 2006 census, its population was 44, in 9 families.
