= Si Vin =

Si Vin سيوين
- Village
- Location within Iran
- Coordinates: 28°34′31″N 56°53′35″E
- Country: Iran
- Province: Kerman
- County: Arzuiyeh
- Bakhsh: Central
- Rural District: Dehsard

Population (2006)
  - Total: 47
- Time zone: UTC+3:30 (IRST)
  - Summer (DST): UTC+4:30 (IRDT)

Si Vin (Persian: سيوين, also Romanized as Sī Vīn) is a village in Dehsard Rural District, in the Central District of Arzuiyeh County, Kerman Province, Iran. At the 2006 census, its population was 47, in 9 families.
