= Ban Ab, Kerman =

Ban Ab بن اب
- Village
- Location within Iran
- Coordinates: 28°43′33″N 56°40′40″E
- Country: Iran
- Province: Kerman
- County: Arzuiyeh
- Bakhsh: Central
- Rural District: Dehsard

Population (2006)
  - Total: 67
- Time zone: UTC+3:30 (IRST)
  - Summer (DST): UTC+4:30 (IRDT)

Ban Ab (Persian: بن اب, also Romanized as Ban Āb and Bonāb; also known as Banāt) is a village in Dehsard Rural District, in the Central District of Arzuiyeh County, Kerman Province, Iran. At the 2006 census, its population was 67, in 20 families.
