= Darreh Nikuiyeh =

Darreh Nikuiyeh دره نيكوييه
- Village
- Location within Iran
- Coordinates: 28°31′32″N 56°44′26″E
- Country: Iran
- Province: Kerman
- County: Arzuiyeh
- Bakhsh: Central
- Rural District: Dehsard

Population (2006)
  - Total: 11
- Time zone: UTC+3:30 (IRST)
  - Summer (DST): UTC+4:30 (IRDT)

Darreh Nikuiyeh (Persian: دره نيكوييه, also Romanized as Darreh Nīkū’īyeh; also known as Darreh Nagū’īyeh) is a village in Dehsard Rural District, in the Central District of Arzuiyeh County, Kerman province, Iran. At the 2006 census, its population was 11, in 4 families.
