= Ashin (disambiguation) =

Ashin is the stage name of the Taiwanese singer Chen Hsin-hung. Ashin may also refer to

- Ashin, an honorific used for monks and nobles in Burmese names
- Ashin, Iran, a village
- Ashin-e Sofla, a village in Iran
- Ashin-e Olya, a village in Iran
- Astan-e Karud, a village in Iran
