= Chenaran-e Yek =

Chenaran-e Yek چناران 1
- Village
- Location within Iran
- Coordinates: 28°30′54″N 57°01′56″E
- Country: Iran
- Province: Kerman
- County: Arzuiyeh
- Bakhsh: Soghan
- Rural District: Soghan

Population (2006)
  - Total: 20
- Time zone: UTC+3:30 (IRST)
  - Summer (DST): UTC+4:30 (IRDT)

Chenaran-e Yek (Persian: چناران 1, also Romanized as Chenārān-e Yek; also known as Chenārān) is a village in Soghan Rural District, Soghan District, Arzuiyeh County, Kerman Province, Iran. At the 2006 census, its population was 20, in 4 families.
