= Heydarabad, Arzuiyeh =

Heydarabad حيدراباد
- Village
- Location within Iran
- Coordinates: 28°23′46″N 56°21′07″E
- Country: Iran
- Province: Kerman
- County: Arzuiyeh
- Bakhsh: Central
- Rural District: Arzuiyeh

Population (2006)
  - Total: 594
- Time zone: UTC+3:30 (IRST)
  - Summer (DST): UTC+4:30 (IRDT)

Heydarabad (Persian: حيدراباد, also Romanized as Ḩeydarābād; also known as Kharābād, Kheir Abad Arzoo’eyeh, Kheyrābād, and Kheyrābād-e Arzū’īyeh) is a village in Arzuiyeh Rural District, in the Central District of Arzuiyeh County, Kerman Province, Iran. At the 2006 census, its population was 594, in 131 families.
