= Kaliyan, Kerman =

Kaliyan كليان
- Village
- Location within Iran
- Coordinates: 28°42′20″N 56°40′56″E
- Country: Iran
- Province: Kerman
- County: Arzuiyeh
- Bakhsh: Central
- Rural District: Dehsard

Population (2006)
  - Total: 50
- Time zone: UTC+3:30 (IRST)
  - Summer (DST): UTC+4:30 (IRDT)

Kaliyan (Persian: كليان, also Romanized as Kalīyān, Kalyān, and Kalīān; also known as Gīlan, Kaliyūn, and Kalyūn) is a village in Dehsard Rural District, in the Central District of Arzuiyeh County, Kerman Province, Iran. At the 2006 census, its population was 50, in 12 families.
