= Bagh Kharab =

Bagh Kharab باغ خراب
- Village
- Location within Iran
- Coordinates: 28°31′35″N 57°04′34″E
- Country: Iran
- Province: Kerman
- County: Arzuiyeh
- Bakhsh: Soghan
- Rural District: Soghan

Population (2006)
  - Total: 48
- Time zone: UTC+3:30 (IRST)
  - Summer (DST): UTC+4:30 (IRDT)

Bagh Kharab (Persian: باغ خراب, also Romanized as Bāgh Kharāb) is a village in Soghan Rural District, Soghan District, Arzuiyeh County, Kerman Province, Iran. At the 2006 census, its population was 48, in 12 families.
