= Abkar Ashayir Garuh-ye 25 =

Abkar Ashayir Garuh-ye 25 ابكارعشايرگروه25
- Village
- Country: Iran
- Province: Kerman
- County: Arzuiyeh
- Bakhsh: Central
- Rural District: Vakilabad

Population (2006)
  - Total: 342
- Time zone: UTC+3:30 (IRST)
  - Summer (DST): UTC+4:30 (IRDT)

Abkar Ashayir Garuh-ye 25 (Persian: ابكارعشايرگروه25, also Romanized as Ābkār ʿAshāyīr Garūh-ye 25) is a village in Vakilabad Rural District, in the Central District of Arzuiyeh County, Kerman Province, Iran. At the 2006 census, its population was 342, in 63 families.
