= Gowd-e Howz =

Gowd-e Howz گودحوض
- Village
- Location within Iran
- Coordinates: 28°34′57″N 56°50′12″E
- Country: Iran
- Province: Kerman
- County: Arzuiyeh
- Bakhsh: Central
- Rural District: Dehsard

Population (2006)
  - Total: 120
- Time zone: UTC+3:30 (IRST)
  - Summer (DST): UTC+4:30 (IRDT)

Gowd-e Howz (Persian: گودحوض, also Romanized as Gowd-e Ḩowẕ and Gowd Ḩowz; also known as Gowd Hofz) is a village in Dehsard Rural District, in the Central District of Arzuiyeh County, Kerman Province, Iran. At the 2006 census, its population was 120, in 29 families.
