= Deh Salar-e Yek =

Deh Salar-e Yek ده سالار1
- Village
- Location within Iran
- Coordinates: 28°34′01″N 56°37′56″E
- Country: Iran
- Province: Kerman
- County: Arzuiyeh
- Bakhsh: Central
- Rural District: Dehsard

Population (2006)
  - Total: 92
- Time zone: UTC+3:30 (IRST)
  - Summer (DST): UTC+4:30 (IRDT)

Deh Salar-e Yek (Persian: ده سالار1, also Romanized as Deh Sālār-e Yek; also known as Deh-e Sālār and Deh Sālār) is a village in Dehsard Rural District, in the Central District of Arzuiyeh County, Kerman Province, Iran. At the 2006 census, its population was 92, in 26 families.
