= Naser-e Do Shahid Chamran =

Naser-e Do Shahid Chamran نثردو شهيدچمران
- Village
- Country: Iran
- Province: Kerman
- County: Arzuiyeh
- Bakhsh: Central
- Rural District: Arzuiyeh

Population (2006)
  - Total: 53
- Time zone: UTC+3:30 (IRST)
  - Summer (DST): UTC+4:30 (IRDT)

Naser-e Do Shahid Chamran (Persian: نثردو شهيدچمران, also Romanized as Nas̱er-e Do Shahīd Chamrān) is a village in Arzuiyeh Rural District, in the Central District of Arzuiyeh County, Kerman Province, Iran. At the 2006 census, its population was 53, in 14 families.
