= Ben Abdan =

Ben Abdan بنابدان
- Village
- Location within Iran
- Coordinates: 28°33′19″N 56°48′18″E
- Country: Iran
- Province: Kerman
- County: Arzuiyeh
- Bakhsh: Central
- Rural District: Dehsard

Population (2006)
  - Total: 114
- Time zone: UTC+3:30 (IRST)
  - Summer (DST): UTC+4:30 (IRDT)

Ben Abdan (Persian: بنابدان, also Romanized as Ben Ābdān, Bon Ābdān, and Bonābdān; also known as Benāh Bedān) is a village in Dehsard Rural District, in the Central District of Arzuiyeh County, Kerman Province, Iran. At the 2006 census, its population was 114, in 39 families.
