= Sorkhan, Arzuiyeh =

Village in Kerman province, Iran

Sorkhan Persian: سرخان
- Village
- Location within Iran
- Coordinates: 28°20′44″N 56°52′27″E
- Country: Iran
- Province: Kerman
- County: Arzuiyeh
- District: Soghan
- Rural District: Soghan

Population (2016)
  - Total: 413
- Time zone: UTC+3:30 (IRST)

Sorkhan (Persian: سرخان) (Note: Also romanized as Sorkhān) is a village in, and the capital of, Soghan Rural District of Soghan District, Arzuiyeh County, Kerman province, Iran.

== Demographics ==
=== Population ===
At the time of the 2006 National Census, the village's population was 378 in 97 households, when it was in the former Arzuiyeh District of Baft County. The following census in 2011 counted 349 people in 94 households, by which time the district had been separated from the county in the establishment of Arzuiyeh County. The rural district was transferred to the new Soghan District. The 2016 census measured the population of the village as 413 people in 117 households.
