= Ashin-e Sofla =

Ashin-e Sofla اشين سفلي
- Village
- Location within Iran
- Coordinates: 28°28′53″N 56°57′35″E
- Country: Iran
- Province: Kerman
- County: Arzuiyeh
- Bakhsh: Soghan
- Rural District: Soghan

Population (2006)
  - Total: 146
- Time zone: UTC+3:30 (IRST)
  - Summer (DST): UTC+4:30 (IRDT)

Ashin-e Sofla (Persian: اشين سفلي, also Romanized as Āshīn-e Soflá; also known as Āshīn, Āshīn-e Pā’īn, and Āshīn Pā’īn) is a village in Soghan Rural District, Soghan District, Arzuiyeh County, Kerman Province, Iran. At the 2006 census, its population was 146, distributed between 31 families.
