= Hoseynabad-e Khani =

Hoseynabad-e Khani (Persian: حسين ابادخاني) may refer to:

- Hoseynabad-e Khani, Arzuiyeh
- Hoseynabad-e Khani, Sirjan
