= Dasht-e Deh, Kerman =

Dasht-e Deh دشت ده
- Village
- Location within Iran
- Coordinates: 28°18′17″N 56°53′38″E
- Country: Iran
- Province: Kerman
- County: Arzuiyeh
- Bakhsh: Soghan
- Rural District: Soghan

Population (2006)
  - Total: 366
- Time zone: UTC+3:30 (IRST)
  - Summer (DST): UTC+4:30 (IRDT)

Dasht-e Deh (Persian: دشت ده, also Romanized as Dasht Deh) is a village in Soghan Rural District, Soghan District, Arzuiyeh County, Kerman Province, Iran. At the 2006 census, its population was 366, in 74 families.
