= Dehan, Kerman =

Dehan دهان
- Village
- Location within Iran
- Coordinates: 28°25′00″N 56°53′50″E
- Country: Iran
- Province: Kerman
- County: Arzuiyeh
- Bakhsh: Soghan
- Rural District: Soghan

Population (2006)
  - Total: 55
- Time zone: UTC+3:30 (IRST)
  - Summer (DST): UTC+4:30 (IRDT)

Dehan (Persian: دهان, also Romanized as Dehān and Dahān) is a village in Soghan Rural District, Soghan District, Arzuiyeh County, Kerman Province, Iran. At the 2006 census, its population was 55, in 11 families.
