= Chilabad =

Chilabad (Persian: چيل اباد) may refer to:

- Chilabad, Kerman
- Chilabad, alternate name of Khorramabad, Arzuiyeh, Kerman Province
