= Chilabad, Kerman =

Chilabad چيل اباد
- Village
- Location within Iran
- Coordinates: 28°14′54″N 56°27′11″E
- Country: Iran
- Province: Kerman
- County: Arzuiyeh
- Bakhsh: Central
- Rural District: Arzuiyeh

Population (2006)
  - Total: 117
- Time zone: UTC+3:30 (IRST)
  - Summer (DST): UTC+4:30 (IRDT)

Chilabad (Persian: چيل اباد, also Romanized as Chīlābād; also known as Mowtowr-e Sālārī) is a village in Arzuiyeh Rural District, in the Central District of Arzuiyeh County, Kerman Province, Iran. At the 2006 census, its population was 117, in 24 families.
