= Aliabad, Soghan =

Village in Kerman province, Iran

Aliabad Persian: علي اباد
- City
- Location within Iran
- Coordinates: 28°21′36″N 56°52′04″E
- Country: Iran
- Province: Kerman
- County: Arzuiyeh
- District: Soghan
- Rural District: Soghan

Population (2016)
  - Total: 1,779
- Time zone: UTC+03:30 (IRST)

Aliabad (Persian: علي آباد) (Note: Also romanized as Rūstāī-ye ‘Alīābād; also known as ‘Alīābād) is a city in Soghan Rural District of Soghan District, Arzuiyeh County, Kerman province, Iran, serving as capital of the district.

== Demographics ==
=== Population ===
At the time of the 2006 National Census, the village's population was 1,101 in 233 households, when it was in the former Arzuiyeh District of Baft County. The following census in 2011 counted 1,489 people in 319 households, by which time the district had been separated from the county in the establishment of Arzuiyeh County. The rural district was transferred to the new Soghan District. The 2016 census measured the population of the village as 1,779 people in 485 households. It was the most populous village in its rural district.
