= Omruduiyeh, Arzuiyeh =

Omruduiyeh عمرودوئيه
- Village
- Location within Iran
- Coordinates: 28°35′27″N 56°51′29″E
- Country: Iran
- Province: Kerman
- County: Arzuiyeh
- Bakhsh: Central
- Rural District: Dehsard

Population (2006)
  - Total: 30
- Time zone: UTC+3:30 (IRST)
  - Summer (DST): UTC+4:30 (IRDT)

Omruduiyeh (Persian: عمرودوئيه, also Romanized as Omrūdū’īyeh and ‘Omrūdū’īyeh) is a village in Dehsard Rural District, in the Central District of Arzuiyeh County, Kerman Province, Iran. At the 2006 census, its population was 30, in 7 families.
