= Ashin-e Olya =

Ashin-e Olya اشين عليا
- Village
- Location within Iran
- Coordinates: 28°29′09″N 56°58′33″E
- Country: Iran
- Province: Kerman
- County: Arzuiyeh
- Bakhsh: Soghan
- Rural District: Soghan

Population (2006)
  - Total: 158
- Time zone: UTC+3:30 (IRST)
  - Summer (DST): UTC+4:30 (IRDT)

Ashin-e Olya (Persian: اشين عليا, also Romanized as Āshīn-e ‘Olyā; also known as Ashin, Āshīn Bālā, and Āshīn-e Bālā) is a village in Soghan Rural District, Soghan District, Arzuiyeh County, Kerman Province, Iran. At the 2006 census, its population was 158, in 38 families.
