= Hoseynabad-e Khani, Arzuiyeh =

Hoseynabad-e Khani حسين ابادخاني
- Village
- Location within Iran
- Coordinates: 28°40′33″N 56°37′30″E
- Country: Iran
- Province: Kerman
- County: Arzuiyeh
- Bakhsh: Central
- Rural District: Dehsard

Population (2006)
  - Total: 112
- Time zone: UTC+3:30 (IRST)
  - Summer (DST): UTC+4:30 (IRDT)

Hoseynabad-e Khani (Persian: حسين ابادخاني, also Romanized as Ḩoseynābād-e Khānī; also known as Ḩoseynābād) is a village in Dehsard Rural District, in the Central District of Arzuiyeh County, Kerman Province, Iran. At the 2006 census, its population was 112, in 28 families.
