= Omruduiyeh =

Omruduiyeh (Persian: عمرودوئيه or امرودوييه) may refer to:

- Omruduiyeh, Bezenjan (امرودوييه - Omrūdūīyeh)
- Omruduiyeh, Dehsard (عمرودوئيه - ‘Omrūdū’īyeh)
