= Kharman Sukhteh, Kerman =

Kharman Sukhteh خرمن سوخته
- Village
- Country: Iran
- Province: Kerman
- County: Arzuiyeh
- Bakhsh: Central
- Rural District: Arzuiyeh

Population (2006)
  - Total: 172
- Time zone: UTC+3:30 (IRST)
  - Summer (DST): UTC+4:30 (IRDT)

Kharman Sukhteh (Persian: خرمن سوخته, also Romanized as Kharman Sūkhteh) is a village in Arzuiyeh Rural District, in the Central District of Arzuiyeh County, Kerman Province, Iran. At the 2006 census, its population was 172, in 45 families.
