= Amirabad Rural District (Arzuiyeh County) =

Rural district in Kerman province, Iran

Amirabad Rural District Persian: دهستان امیرآباد
- Rural District
- Location within Iran
- Coordinates: 28°23′55″N 56°56′14″E
- Country: Iran
- Province: Kerman
- County: Arzuiyeh
- District: Soghan
- Capital: Amirabad-e Yek

Population (2016)
  - Total: 5,154
- Time zone: UTC+3:30 (IRST)

Amirabad Rural District (Persian: دهستان امیرآباد) is in Soghan District of Arzuiyeh County, Kerman province, Iran. Its capital is the village of Amirabad-e Yek.

== History ==
After the 2006 National Census, Arzuiyeh District and Dehsard Rural District were separated from Baft County in the establishment of Arzuiyeh County, and Amirabad Rural District was created in the new Soghan District.

== Demographics ==
=== Population ===
At the time of the 2011 census, the rural district's population was 5,490 in 1,427 households. The 2016 census measured the population of the rural district as 5,154 in 1,427 households. The most populous of its 52 villages was Ebrahimabad, with 452 people.
