= Patkan, Kerman =

Village in Kerman province, Iran

Patkan Persian: پتكان
- Village
- Location within Iran
- Coordinates: 28°40′46″N 56°33′04″E
- Country: Iran
- Province: Kerman
- County: Arzuiyeh
- District: Central
- Rural District: Dehsard

Population (2016)
  - Total: 481
- Time zone: UTC+3:30 (IRST)

Patkan (Persian: پتكان) (Note: Also romanized as Patkān) is a village in, and the capital of, Dehsard Rural District of the Central District of Arzuiyeh County, Kerman province, Iran.

== Demographics ==
=== Population ===
At the time of the 2006 National Census, the village's population was 761 in 171 households, when it was in the Central District of Baft County. The following census in 2011 counted 470 people in 124 households, by which time the rural district had been separated from the county in the establishment of Arzuiyeh County. It was transferred to the new Central District. The 2016 census measured the population of the village as 481 people in 146 households.
