= Soghan =

Soghan may refer to:

- Soghan District, Iran
- Soghan Rural District, Iran
- Soghan, a sub-kingdom or lordship of Uí Mháine, a medieval kingdom of Ireland
