= Jughan, Arzuiyeh =

Village in Kerman province, Iran

Jughan Persian: جوغان
- Village
- Location within Iran
- Coordinates: 28°40′12″N 56°32′58″E
- Country: Iran
- Province: Kerman
- County: Arzuiyeh
- District: Central
- Rural District: Dehsard

Population (2016)
  - Total: 967
- Time zone: UTC+3:30 (IRST)

Jughan (Persian: جوغان) (Note: Also romanized as Jowghān and Jūghān) is a village in Dehsard Rural District of the Central District of Arzuiyeh County, Kerman province, Iran.

== Demographics ==
=== Population ===
At the time of the 2006 National Census, the village's population was 380 in 89 households, when it was in the Central District of Baft County. The following census in 2011 counted 1,135 people in 278 households, by which time the rural district had been separated from the county in the establishment of Arzuiyeh County. It was transferred to the new Central District. The 2016 census measured the population of the village as 967 people in 275 households. It was the most populous village in its rural district.
