= Gijuiyeh, Arzuiyeh =

Gijuiyeh گيجوييه
- Village
- Location within Iran
- Coordinates: 28°32′25″N 56°30′43″E
- Country: Iran
- Province: Kerman
- County: Arzuiyeh
- Bakhsh: Central
- Rural District: Dehsard

Population (2006)
  - Total: 222
- Time zone: UTC+3:30 (IRST)
  - Summer (DST): UTC+4:30 (IRDT)

Gijuiyeh (Persian: گيجوييه, also Romanized as Gījū’īyeh; also known as Giju, Gījūyeh, Kījū, and Kījū’īyeh) is a village in Dehsard Rural District, in the Central District of Arzuiyeh County, Kerman Province, Iran. At the 2006 census, its population was 222, in 51 families.
