= Shomilan =

Shomilan or Shemilan (Persian: شميلان) may refer to:

- Shemilan, Kerman
- Shomilan, Khuzestan
