= Ashin, Iran =

Ashin عشين
- village
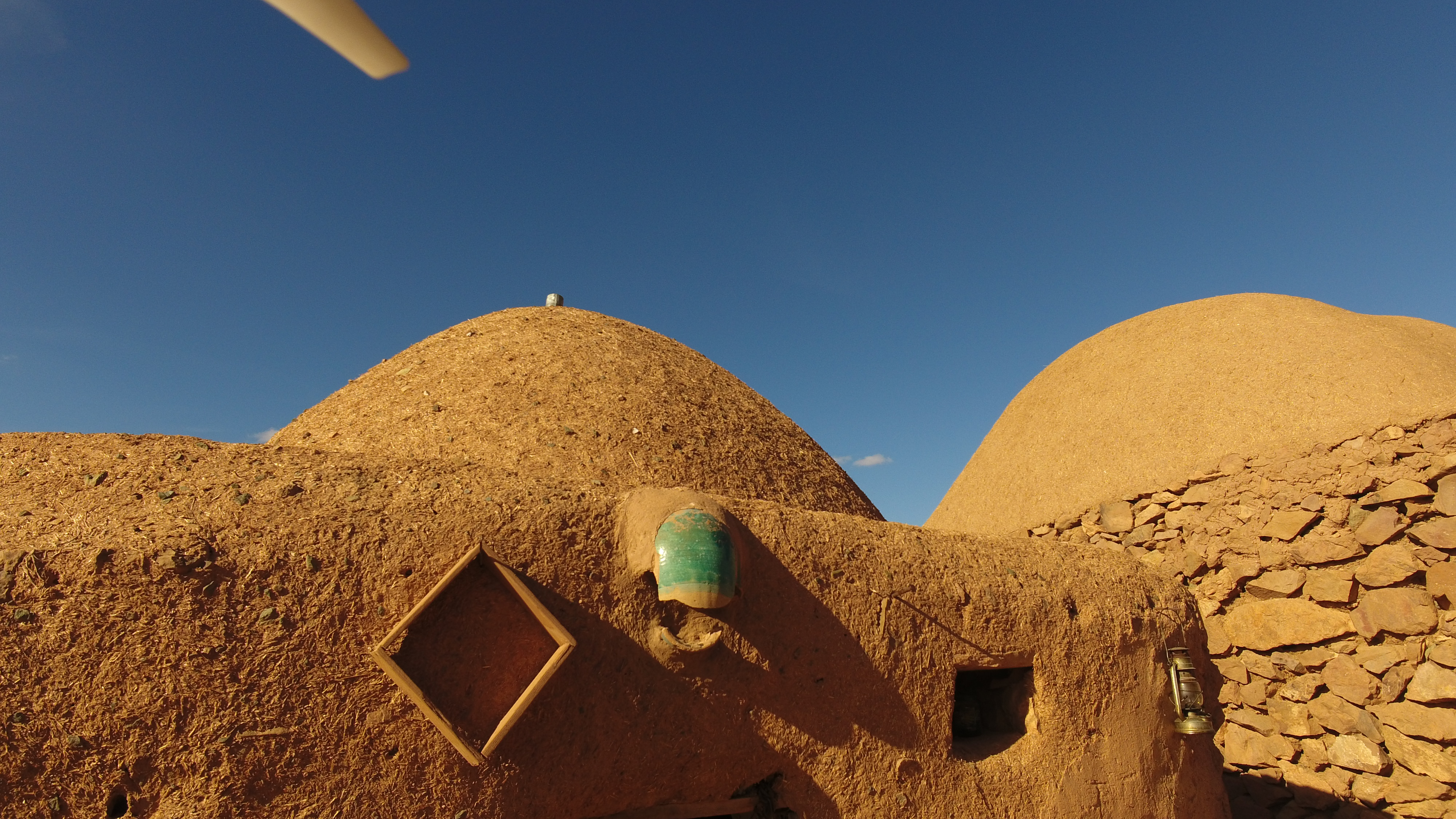

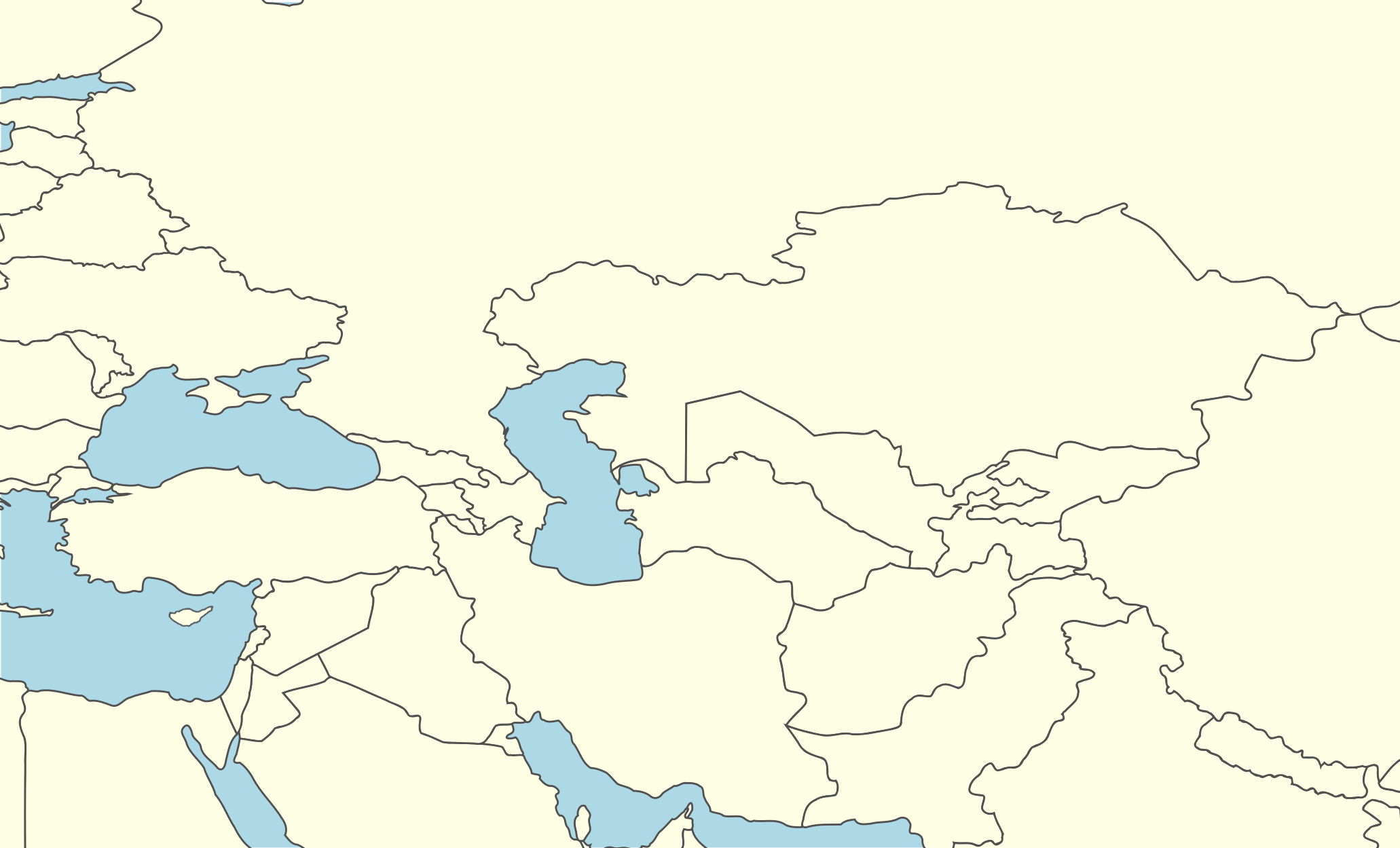
- Location within Iran Location within Central Asia
- Coordinates: 33°29′38″N 53°29′04″E
- Country: Iran
- Province: Isfahan
- County: Nain
- Bakhsh: Anarak
- Rural District: Chupanan
- Time zone: UTC+3:30 (IRST)
  - Summer (DST): UTC+4:30 (IRDT)

Ashin (Persian: اشین، عشين, also Romanized as ʿAshīn) is an ancient village over 1700-year of history in Anarak District, Nain County, Isfahan Province, Iran. Ashin and its public bath were registered as a National Heritage site at June 2014 by an architect, Mozhgan Bagheri .

Ashin is an abandoned village on a former Silk Road caravan route, known for its desert architecture. It declined as residents migrated to cities.

Ashin is located in the central desert of Iran, west of Anarak, at an elevation of 1,394 metres (4,573 ft).

== Census ==
At the 2006 census, Ashin's existence was noted, though its population was not reported.

== Awards and recognition ==
In 2021, the restoration of Ashin Village, led by architect Mozhgan Bagheri, received the 1st Rank in Historical Spaces and Textures Restoration and Recovery at the 1st National Iranian Contemporary and Historical Buildings Restoration and Recovery Prize Event. The award, presented by the Ministry of Cultural Heritage, Tourism, and Handicrafts, recognizes significant contributions to preserving and restoring Iranian historical sites.

== Geography ==
Ashin is located in the Central Desert (Markazi Desert) region:

- 250 km northeast of Isfahan (1,380 m above sea level),
- 120 km northwest of Nain,
- 50 km northwest of Anarak.

The village is renowned among desert explorers and adventurers for its proximity to natural attractions, including the Rig-e Jen Desert.

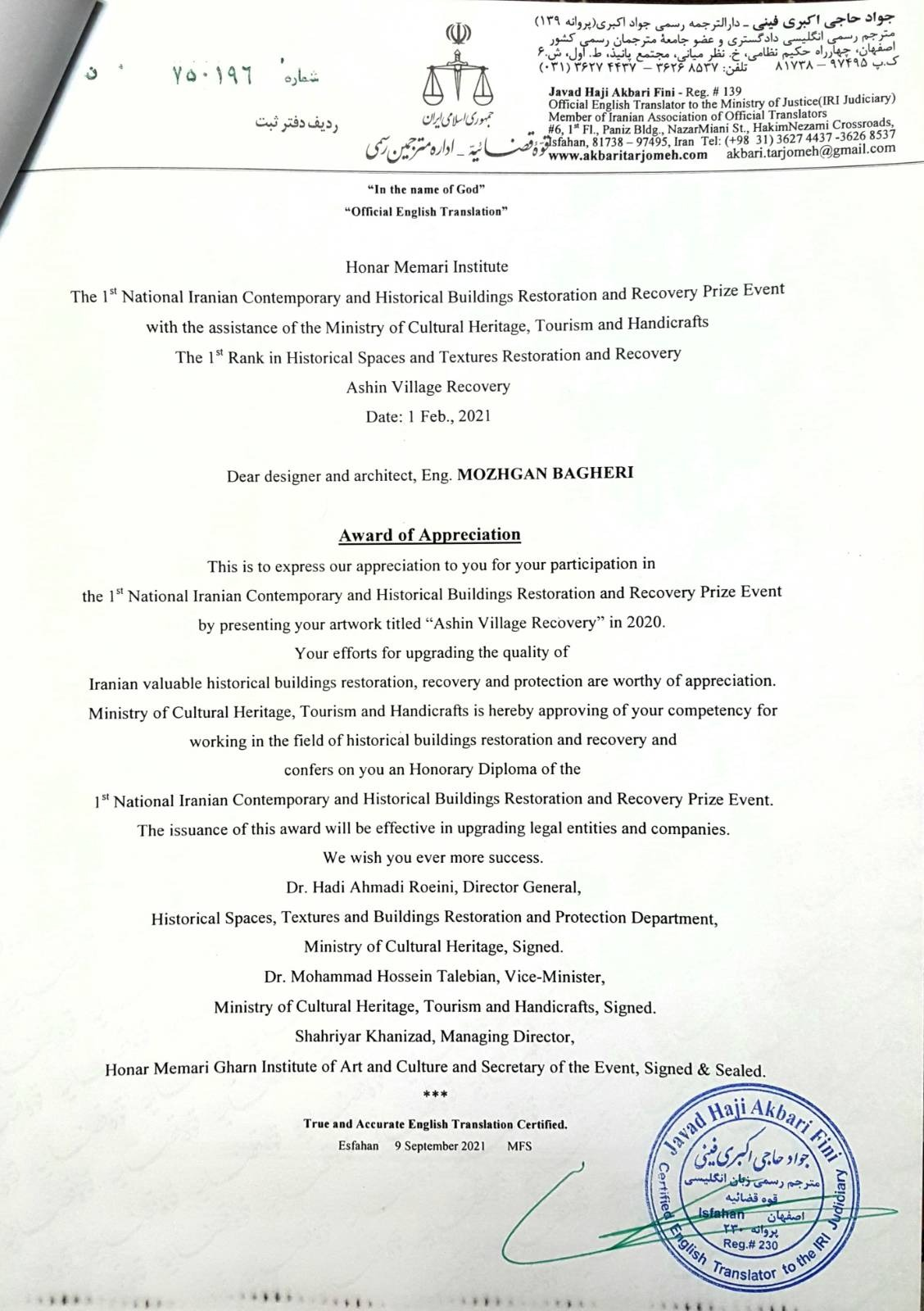
10A-1st National Iraninan Contemporary and Historical Buildings Restoration and Recovery Prize
