= Arazi-ye Qaleh Now =

Arazi-ye Qaleh Now اراضي قلعه نو
- Village
- Country: Iran
- Province: Kerman
- County: Arzuiyeh
- Bakhsh: Central
- Rural District: Vakilabad

Population (2006)
  - Total: 106
- Time zone: UTC+3:30 (IRST)
  - Summer (DST): UTC+4:30 (IRDT)

Arazi-ye Qaleh Now (Persian: اراضي قلعه نو, also Romanized as Ārāz̤ī-ye Qal‘eh Now) is a village in Vakilabad Rural District, in the Central District of Arzuiyeh County, Kerman Province, Iran. At the 2006 census, its population was 106, in 25 families.
