= Mohammadabad, Arzuiyeh =

Mohammadabad محمداباد
- Village
- Location within Iran
- Coordinates: 28°25′25″N 56°20′12″E
- Country: Iran
- Province: Kerman
- County: Arzuiyeh
- Bakhsh: Central
- Rural District: Arzuiyeh

Population (2006)
  - Total: 745
- Time zone: UTC+3:30 (IRST)
  - Summer (DST): UTC+4:30 (IRDT)

Mohammadabad (Persian: محمداباد, also Romanized as Moḩammadābād; also known as Mahdābad, Mohammad Abad Arzoo’eyeh, and Moḩammadābād-e Arzū’īyeh) is a village in Arzuiyeh Rural District, in the Central District of Arzuiyeh County, Kerman Province, Iran. At the 2006 census, its population was 745, in 156 families.
