= Dasht-e Deh =

Dasht-e Deh or Dasht Deh (Persian: دشت ده) may refer to:

- Dasht-e Deh, Kerman
- Dasht Deh, Yazd
