= Mahdabad =

Mahdabad (Persian: مهد اباد) may refer to:

- Mahdabad, Hormozgan
- Mahdabad, Kerman
