= Shamiran =

Shamiran may refer to:

- Semiramis, legendary Assyrian queen
- Shamiran, Iran, a village in Mazandaran Province
- Shamiran, Kerman, a village in Kerman Province
- Shamiram, Armenia, also called Shamiran
