= Shemilan, Kerman =

Shemilan شميلان
- Village
- Location within Iran
- Coordinates: 28°30′28″N 56°43′40″E
- Country: Iran
- Province: Kerman
- County: Arzuiyeh
- Bakhsh: Central
- Rural District: Dehsard

Population (2006)
  - Total: 36
- Time zone: UTC+3:30 (IRST)
  - Summer (DST): UTC+4:30 (IRDT)

Shemilan (Persian: شميلان, also Romanized as Shemīlān; also known as Shamīrān and Shemīrān) is a village in Dehsard Rural District, in the Central District of Arzuiyeh County, Kerman Province, Iran. At the 2006 census, its population was 36, in 7 families.
