= Dahan =

Dahan may refer to:

== Places ==
- Dahan, Iran (disambiguation), places in Iran
- Dahan River, a river in Taiwan

== Other uses ==
- Dahan (surname)
- Dahan (solar term), solar term of traditional East Asian Lunisolar calendar
- Dahan (1985 film), a 1985 Bangladeshi film
- Dahan (1997 film), a 1997 Indian Bengali-language film directed by Rituparno Ghosh
- Dahan (2018 film), a 2018 Bangladeshi film
- Dahan (TV series), Indian television series
- Dahan Institute of Technology, a university in Hualien County, Taiwan

== See also ==
- Han (disambiguation)
