= Zardar =

Zardar (Persian: زردر) may refer to:

- Zardar, Kerman
- Zardar, Tehran
