= Dehan =

Dehan may refer to:

- Dehan, Kerman, Iran
- Dehan, Razavi Khorasan, Iran
- Dehan dialect, a regional variety of Assamese

== See also ==
- Dahan (disambiguation)
- Now Dehan ('New Dehan'), Razavi Khorasan Province
