= Gijuiyeh =

Gijuiyeh (Persian: گيجوئيه or گيجوييه) may refer to:

- Gijuiyeh, Arzuiyeh (گيجوييه)
- Gijuiyeh, Baft (گيجوئيه)
