= Kharman Sukhteh =

Kharman Sukhteh (Persian: خرمن سوخته) may refer to:

- Kharman Sukhteh, Kerman
- Kharman Sukhteh, Qazvin
