= Razdar, Arzuiyeh =

Razdar رزدر
- Village
- Location within Iran
- Coordinates: 28°34′42″N 56°46′48″E
- Country: Iran
- Province: Kerman
- County: Arzuiyeh
- Bakhsh: Central
- Rural District: Dehsard

Population (2006)
  - Total: 35
- Time zone: UTC+3:30 (IRST)
  - Summer (DST): UTC+4:30 (IRDT)

Razdar (Persian: رزدر; also known as Zardar) is a village in Dehsard Rural District, in the Central District of Arzuiyeh County, Kerman Province, Iran. At the 2006 census, its population was 35, in 9 families.
