= Giju =

Giju may refer to: Albino Gorilla

- Gijow
- Gijuiyeh (disambiguation)
