= Claes-Göran =

Claes-Göran may refer to:

- Claes-Göran Brandin (born 1948), Swedish politician
- Claes-Göran Cederlund (born 1948), Swedish physician and birdwatcher
- Claes-Göran Fant (born 1951), Swedish Army lieutenant general
- Claes-Göran Granqvist (born 1946), Swedish physicist
- Claes-Göran Hedén (born 1944), Swedish Coastal Artillery brigadier general
