= Galloway Hoard =

Viking Age hoard of silver jewellery and other items

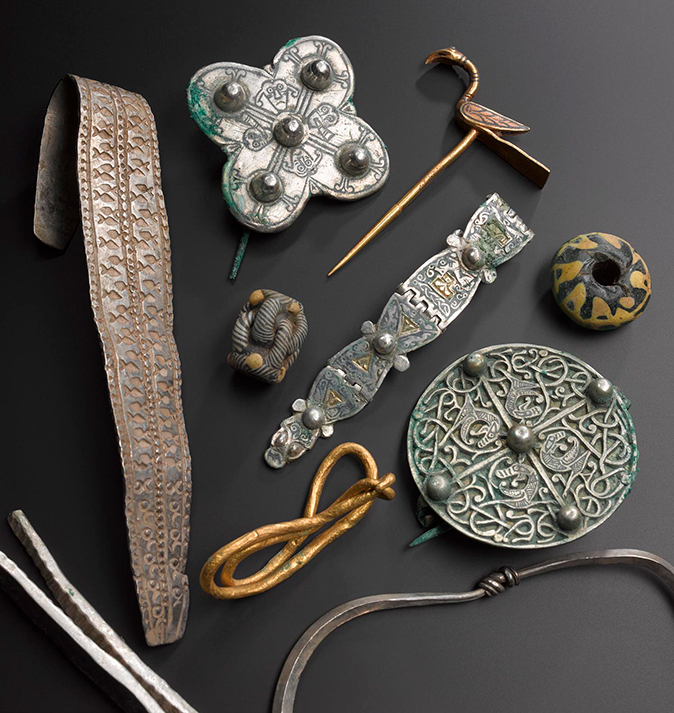
- A selection of objects from the Viking Age Galloway Hoard
- Period/culture: approx. 900 AD
- Discovered: September 2014
- Place: Near Balmaghie, Kirkcudbrightshire, Scotland
- Present location: Australian National Maritime Museum
- www.nms.ac.uk/discover-catalogue/galloway-hoard

The Galloway Hoard, owned by the National Museum of Scotland in Edinburgh, is a hoard of more than 100 gold, silver, glass, crystal, stone, and earthenware objects from the Viking Age, discovered in the historical county of Kirkcudbrightshire in Dumfries and Galloway in Scotland, in September 2014. Found on Church of Scotland land, the hoard has been described by experts as "one of the most significant Viking hoards ever found in Scotland". With years of extensive study and research, scholars are still not certain who buried the hoard, why they did so and whether they were Vikings or Anglo-Saxons. During the Viking Age, Galloway found itself squeezed between two Viking kingdoms and essentially cut off from other Anglo-Saxons in Britain – "Galloway is where these different cultures were meeting. It's not just Scandinavians, but people from Britain and Ireland as well."

The Galloway Hoard was discovered by a metal detector enthusiast who reported the find to the authorities. A county archaeologist carried out an excavation which unearthed a rich and unusually varied collection of objects from the Viking Age, though some of the objects considerably pre-date that period. It is thought that the hoard was buried some time in the mid-ninth or tenth century; it is not known why it was buried.

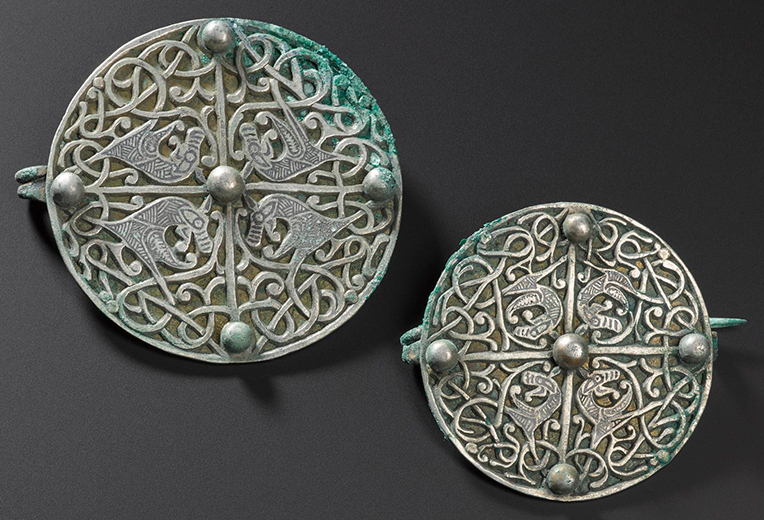
Large disc brooch consisting of two discs riveted together, the decorative front disc pierced silver, the back disc copper alloy with possible gilt surface on one side, visible through the pierced upper disc

The hoard consists of objects including armbands, a Christian cross, brooches, ingots, glass beads, a gold-encased touchstone and dirt-balls containing flecks of gold and bone, all in a silver vessel. These include the largest and most varied collection of Viking-age gold objects yet found in Britain and Ireland. Research has revealed that the vessel was made in western Asia. The items among the treasure originated across a wide geographic area that includes Anglo-Saxon England, Ireland, and Scandinavia. The hoard has some similarities with other Viking finds, but its mixture of materials including the textiles which were wrapped around the vessel has been described by experts as unique.

Curators at the National Museum of Scotland describe the Galloway Hoard as "pointing to a new understanding of Scotland in the international context of the earliest Viking Age". According to Stuart Campbell of the National Museum of Scotland, "This is a hugely significant find, nothing like this has been found in Scotland before in terms of the range of material this hoard represents." He comments that "due to the quantity and variety of the objects, and the importance of the find overall, it will take some time for experts to assess the hoard as a whole so that we can appreciate its true significance. We look forward to learning more." Ongoing research has utilised new technologies, including 3D modelling, CT scans, and X-ray imaging, to reveal previously unseen details on the hoard's objects, especially relating to the vessel's surface decorations.

== Discovery ==
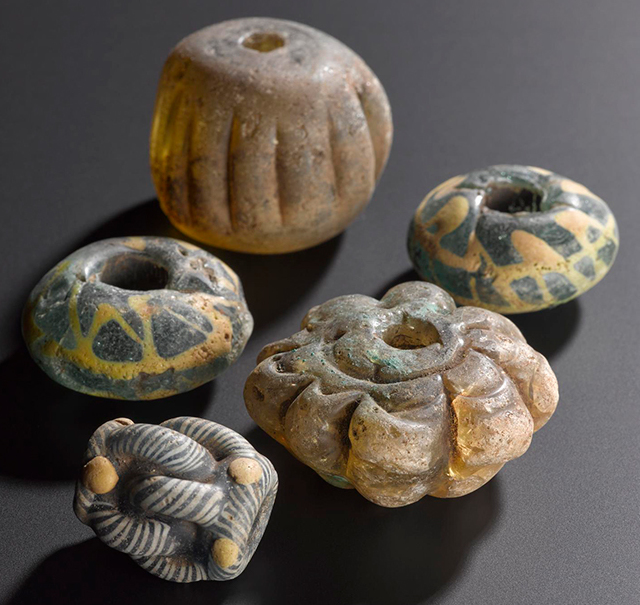
A selection of beads, including a large 'melon' style bead with ribbed edge, and slightly yellowed clear glass

The hoard was discovered at an undisclosed location on glebelands owned by the Church of Scotland. It was found by Derek McLennan, a metal detectorist from Ayrshire. He was accompanied by two churchmen, Rev Dr. David Bartholomew and Pastor Mike Smith, who were also metal detector enthusiasts. The trio had permission to search the site, which McLennan had been investigating for more than a year, and he found a silver object, which turned out to be an arm ring, after an hour's searching. According to McLennan, "initially I didn't understand what I had found because I thought it was a silver spoon and then I turned it over and wiped my thumb across it and I saw the saltire-type of design and knew instantly it was Viking." He ran over to Bartholomew, shouting "Viking!" It was not his first discovery; in 2013, McLennan had discovered Scotland's largest hoard of medieval silver coins near Twynholm.

The find was reported to Scotland's Treasure Trove Unit and a county archaeologist, Andrew Nicholson, undertook an excavation with McLennan's assistance. They dug further and found a collection of artefacts at a depth of 60 cm (24 in). When the artefacts had been removed, McLennan carried out a further search with his metal detector and found a second level of the hoard, buried beneath the first. Among the finds was an early Christian silver cross. Bartholomew said, "It was tremendously exciting, especially when we noticed the silver cross lying face-downwards. It was poking out from under the pile of silver ingots and decorated arm-rings, with a finely wound silver chain still attached to it. It was a heart-stopping moment when the local archaeologist turned it over to reveal rich decoration on the other side."

== Silver vessel and contents ==
The vessel was one of the older items in the hoard and may have been more than 100 years old by the time it was deposited. It was made of a silver alloy and was found wrapped in the remains of a cloth, with its lid still in place. It contained more objects and was examined using X-rays in November 2014 before being opened and emptied. Later research revealed that the vessel was not Carolingian in origin as had been thought, but Western Asian. Once the fabric was removed, the ornamentation was revealed to include a Zoroastrian fire-altar, and the silver is alloyed with copper, both suggesting an origin in the Sasanid Empire. In addition, isotope analysis of the lead in the alloy and niello indicates it is from the mine at Nakhlak in central Iran.

The contents were found to be a collection of silver Anglo-Saxon disc brooches, an Irish silver brooch, Byzantine silk from the area around Constantinople (now Istanbul), a gold ingot and gold and rock crystal objects wrapped in cloth. The vessel may have been an heirloom owned by the family that buried the hoard. The silver cross may have come from Dublin and is engraved with unusual decorations on each of the four arms, which McLennan has suggested may represent each of the four Gospels.

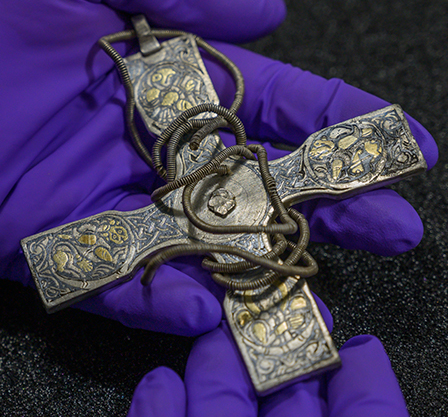
Ornamented silver pectoral cross with wire chain

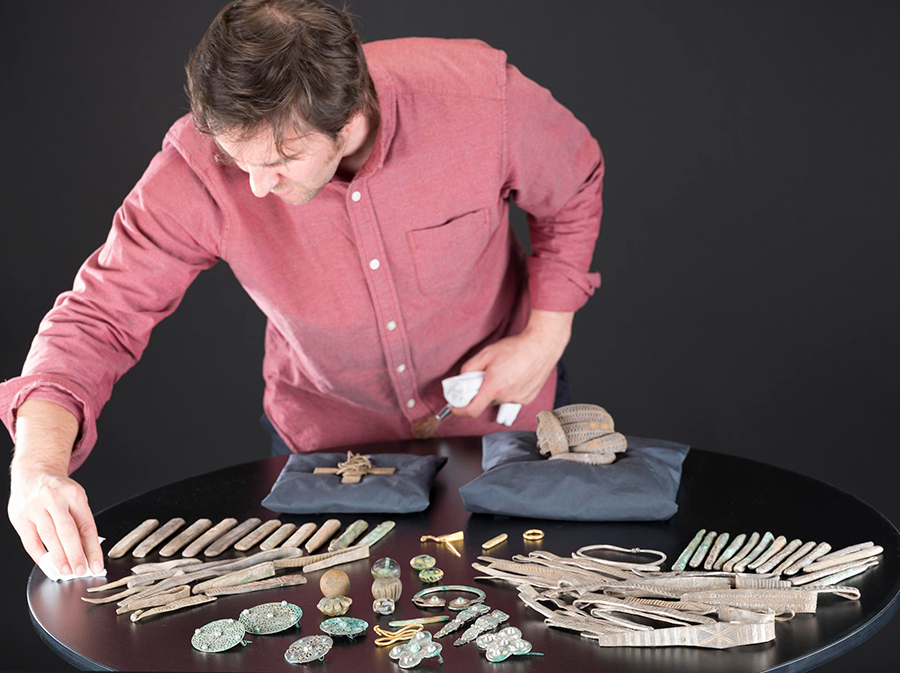
Martin Goldberg, senior curator at National Museums Scotland, examining the hoard

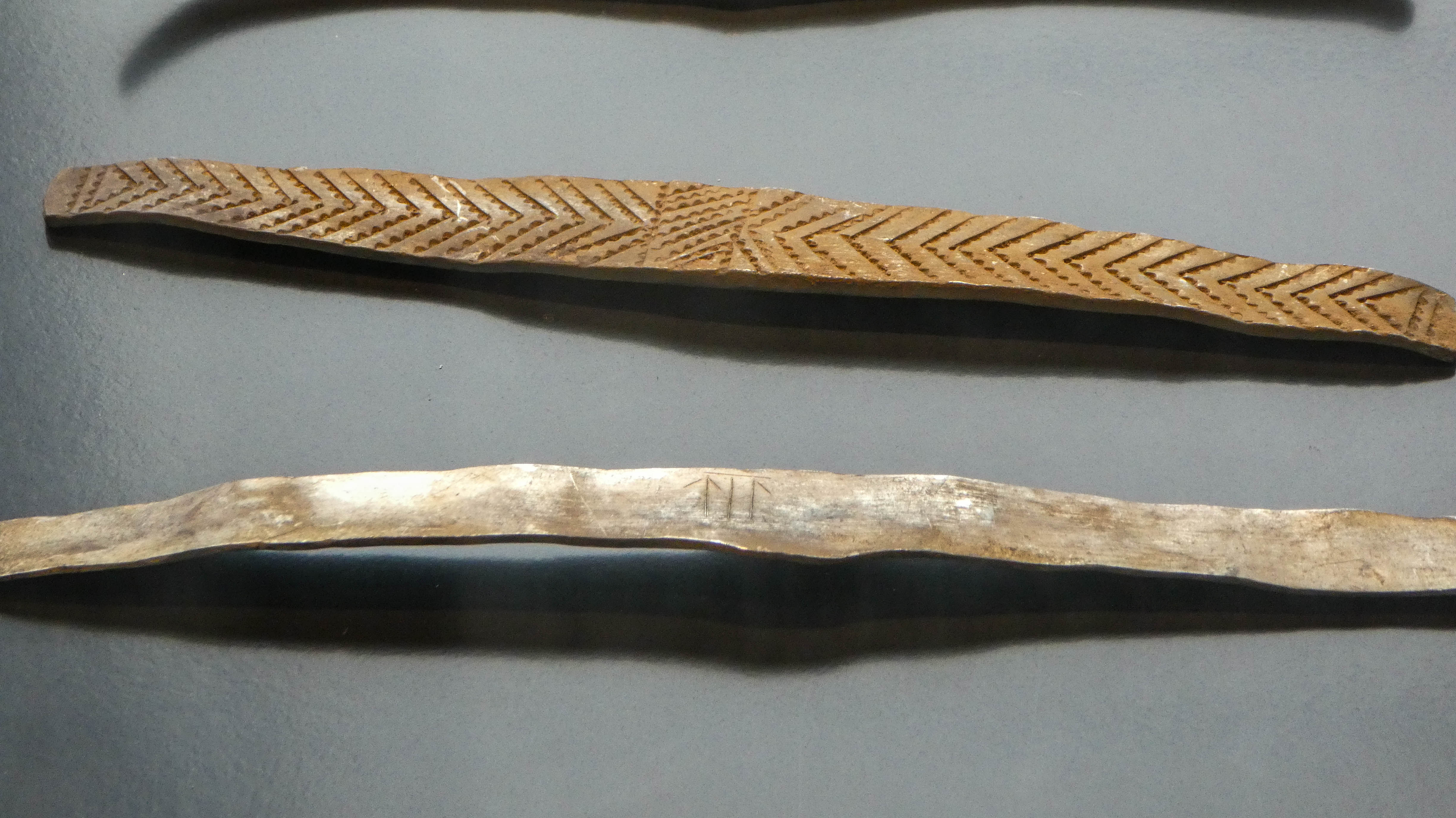
Arm-rings inscribed with Anglo-Saxon runes

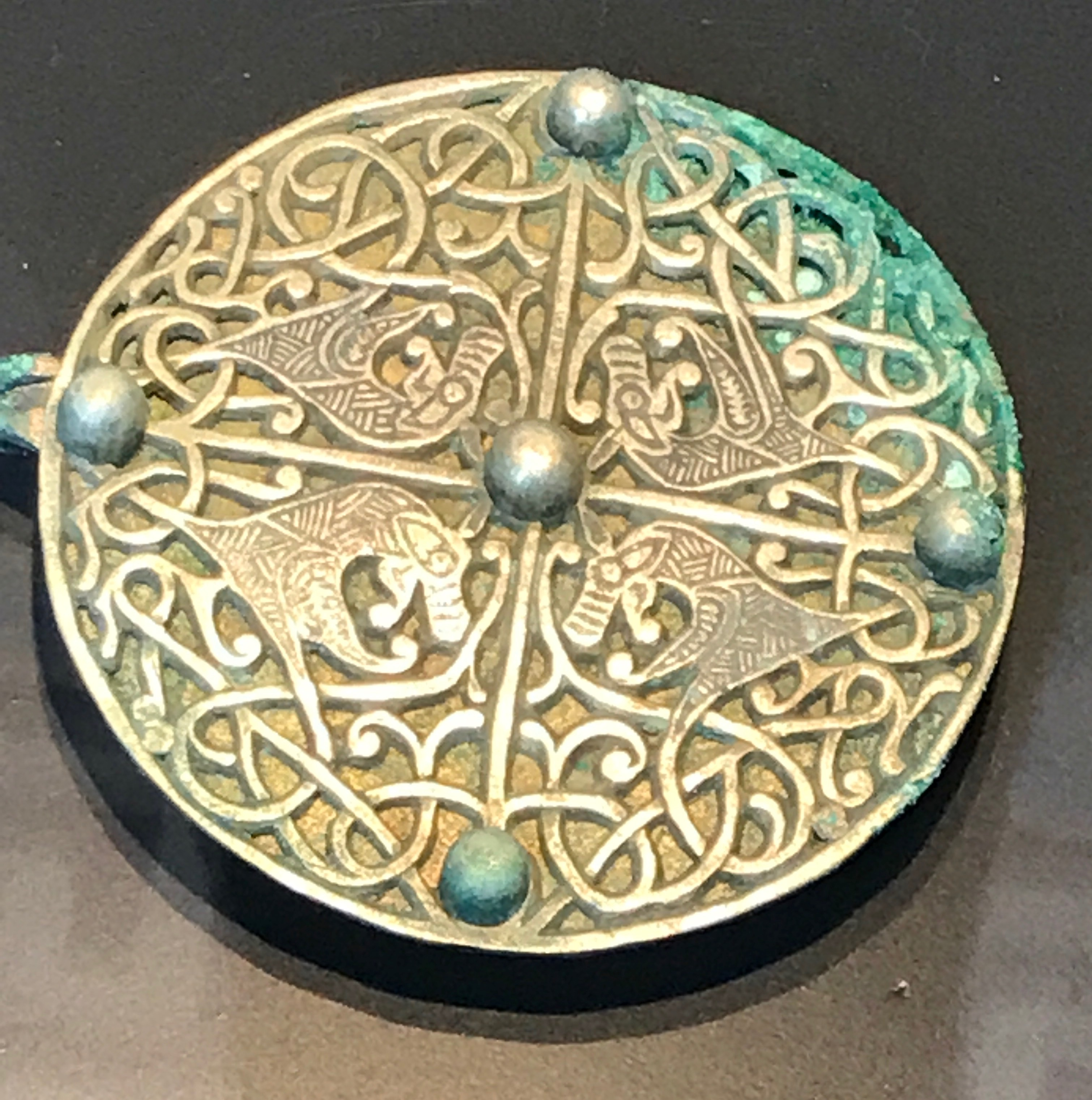
Brooch

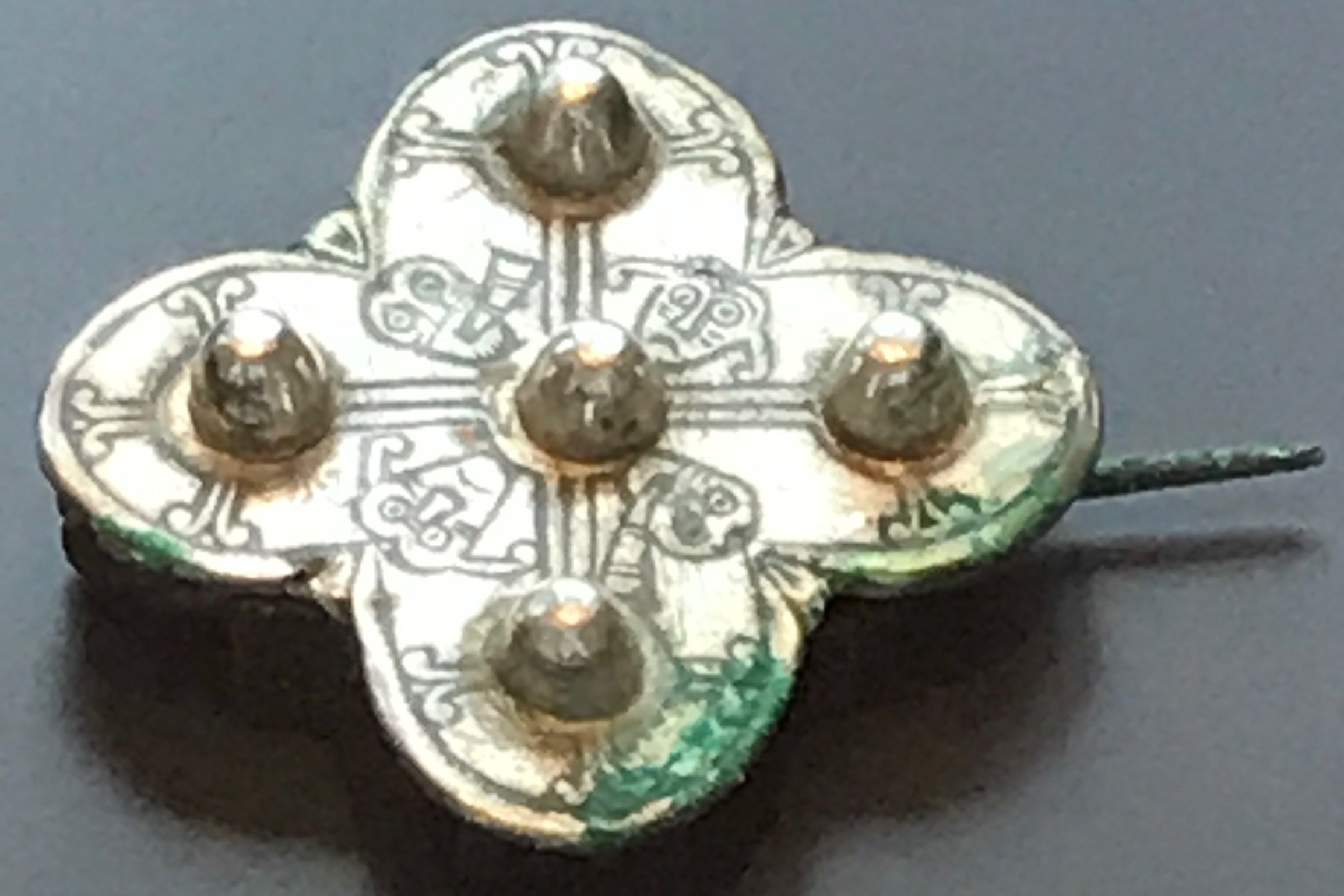
Unique style of Anglo-Saxon brooch

== Runic inscriptions ==
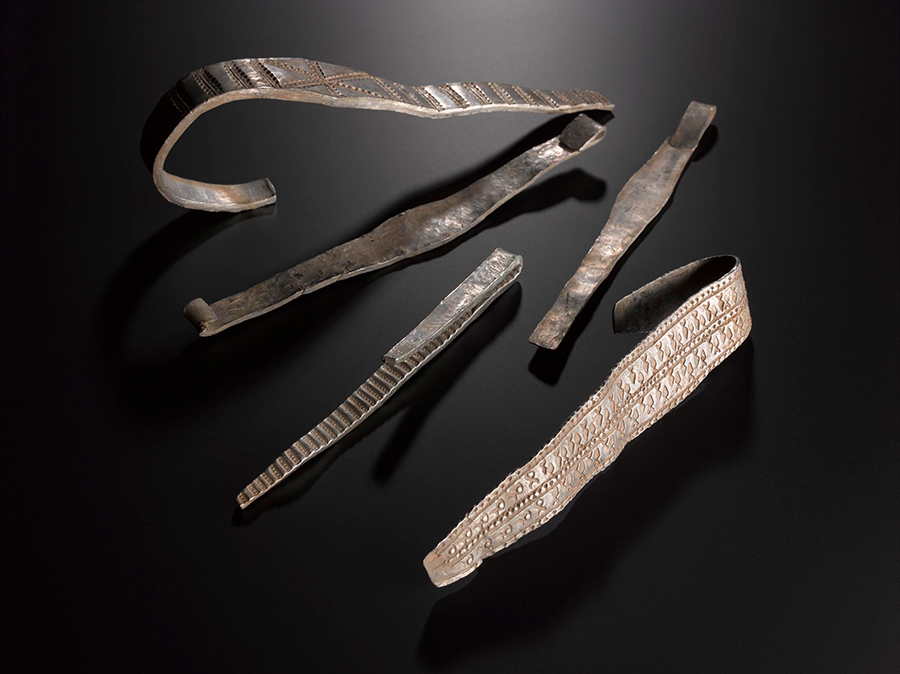
A selection of silver broad-band arm-rings, which were originally penannular but have been flattened

Five of the silver armbands have runic inscriptions scratched on them. Although the hoard is considered to be a Viking hoard, the inscriptions are written in Anglo-Saxon runes, and they record Anglo-Saxon names. David Parsons of the University of Wales has identified one of the names as the common Anglo-Saxon personal name Ecgbeorht (Egbert in modern English), written as EGGBRECT ᛖᚷᚷᛒᚱᛖᚳᛏ. He conjectures that each of the five names scratched on the armbands may identify the owner of part of the hoard, and that these people may have been responsible for burying the hoard. As Galloway was part of Anglo-Saxon Northumbria, they may have lived locally. In February 2025, it was announced that the inscription “DIS IS ЇIGNA ˑFˑ” from an arm ring had been deciphered to read "This is the community’s wealth", and this was understood to mean that the hoard was owned by the community rather than an individual at the time of its burial.

== Context and further excavations ==
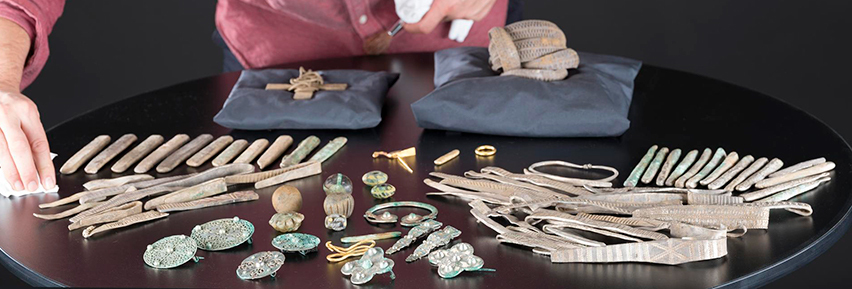
Items laid out at the Museum of Scotland

Following the discovery of the hoard, Historic Scotland, the Museum of Scotland and the archaeological contractors AOC Archaeology agreed that a wider archaeological investigation was needed to find out more about the hoard's context. The site was put under 24-hour security and a local farmer put his biggest bull in the field to deter intruders. A 30 m by 30 m trench was dug, centred on the findspot. Over a hundred more objects were discovered including a silver ingot, a complete silver bracelet, fragments of another silver bracelet and small pieces of silver, iron and copper alloy plus fragments of daub, suggesting the presence of a building. A geophysical survey carried out by Glasgow University revealed that the hoard had been buried under the corner of a rectangular timber building outlined by a double row of posts. It is not known whether there was any link between the hoard and the building, or whether the building was coincidentally constructed over the hoard at a later date.

The survey and earlier aerial photography showed that the building had been constructed within a large, rectilinear double-ditched enclosure which was partitioned by a separate enclosure. According to historical sources, an early Christian ecclesiastical foundation was located nearby and the hoard's site may have been associated with monastic activity. These findings prompted Historic Scotland to schedule the whole field as a site of national importance in September 2014.

== Purpose of disposal ==
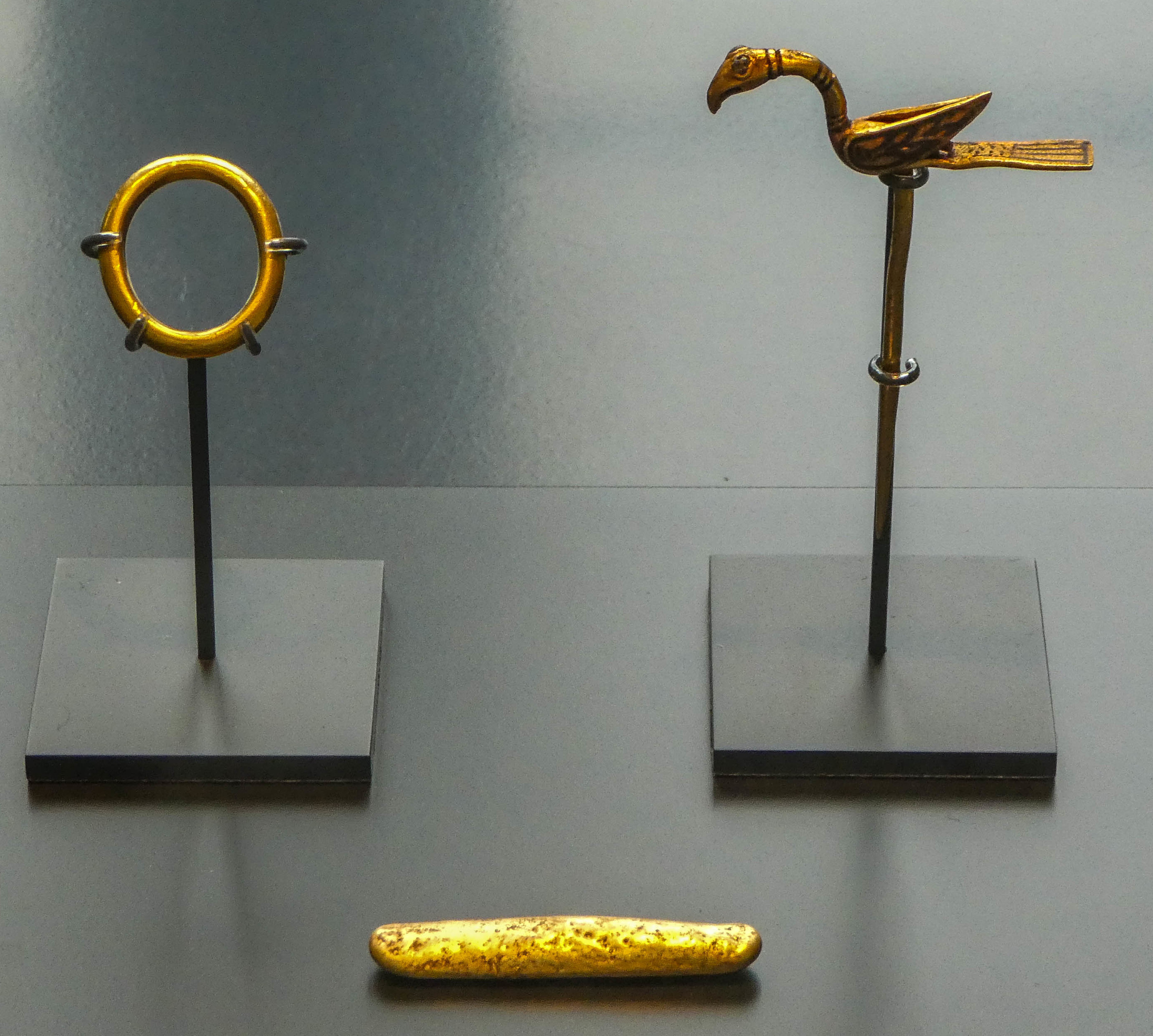
Gold objects found in a wooden box in one of the parcels

The reason for the hoard's burial is unknown, but Campbell has suggested that it was buried for safekeeping, likening it to "a safety deposit box that was never claimed". He comments that the discovery may change views of the historical relationship between Scotland and the Vikings: "We have the idea of Vikings as foreigners who carried out raids on Scotland, but this was a Viking area where they settled and traded, and the people who lived there were culturally and linguistically Norse."

It is also not clear why the hoard was buried in two discrete levels. It may simply have been buried in two instalments at different times, presumably by the same individual. Alternatively, the burier may have sought to ensure that the more valuable objects – the gold items and the Asian pot – were more deeply buried, and thus more secure. The contents of the two levels of the hoard are dissimilar; the upper level of the hoard consists of smaller and less valuable items which would have been the equivalent of "loose change" in the Viking bullion economy, while the lower level represents a much rarer and more exotic collection of valuables.

== Modern ownership ==
The hoard falls under the Scottish common law of treasure trove and was held by the Queen's and Lord Treasurer's Remembrancer. The law entitles the finder to a reward related to the market value of the items discovered. The Church of Scotland filed a legal action against McLennan. The Kirk said it was entitled to an equitable share of the find. McLennan and the landowners, the Church of Scotland's General Trustees, agreed to share the eventual proceeds. Their total value was determined at £1.98 million in 2017 by an advisory panel to the Queen's and Lord Treasurer's Remembrancer (QLTR). David Robertson, the Secretary to the General Trustees, has said that "any money arising from this will first and foremost be used for the good of the local parish." The hoard will be offered first to Scottish museums; Dumfries and Galloway Council wanted, in 2016, to acquire the hoard for a new art gallery in Kirkcudbright, and the National Museum of Scotland indicated that it would apply for it.

After a fundraising campaign in 2017, the National Museum of Scotland raised the funds to give the hoard a permanent home in Scotland. It was acquired by the museum for £1.98 million.

=== Touring ===
In December 2018, the museum announced a tour around some Scottish museums, originally planned to last between May 2020 and August 2022. The Galloway Hoard exhibition was on display at the National Museum of Scotland from 29 May to 12 September 2021, after which it was planned to go on tour to Kirkcudbright Galleries from 9 October 2021 to 10 July 2022 and to Aberdeen Museum and Art Gallery from 30 July to 23 October 2022.

The collection was displayed at the South Australian Museum in Adelaide from 8 February 2025 to 27 July 2025. This was the first occasion that the collection has been shown outside Scotland. It was on display at Melbourne Museum from 29 August 2025 to 26 January 2026. It is currently on display at the Australian National Maritime Museum from 28 May 2026 to 11 October 2026.

== See also ==
- List of hoards in Great Britain
- Talnotrie Hoard
