= Nakhlak Lead Complex =

Mine in Isfahan province, Iran

Nakhlak Lead Complex Persian: معدن نخلك
- Mine
- Location within Iran
- Coordinates: 33°33′45″N 53°50′35″E
- Country: Iran
- Province: Isfahan
- County: Nain
- District: Anarak
- Rural District: Chupanan

Population (2016)
  - Total: Below reporting threshold
- Time zone: UTC+3:30 (IRST)

Nakhlak Lead Complex (Persian: معدن نخلك) (Note: Also romanized as Maʿdan-e Nakhlak; also known as Nakhlak) is a village in Chupanan Rural District of Anarak District in Nain County, Isfahan province, Iran.

== Demographics ==
=== Population ===
At the time of the 2006 National Census, the mine's population was 55 in 52 households. The following census in 2011 counted nine people in five households. The 2016 census measured the population of the village as below the reporting threshold.

== Nakhlak Lead Complex ==
Nakhlak Lead Complex has a history of 2,500 years, which is one of the oldest Underground mines in the country, lying on the side-line of the Central Desert in Iran.

The method of extraction in this mine is accumulative. Nakhlak, in recent years, has been able to produce more than its nominal capacity which is sent to the market. The amount of the sustainable Mineral is 30,000 tons annually which through processing, 3000 tons of concentrate is produced in a year.

The establishment of a 6,000-ton processing plant, revival of Lead Mines in Anarak region, new exploration projects and the establishment of Iran Mining Museum are all in progress in the Complex. The Mine holds ISO14001, ISO9001 & OHSAS 18001 certificates.

The Nakhlak mine, 55 kilometers northeast of Anarak is the largest and one of the most ancient lead ore deposits ever exploited in the Anarak region. Mining history, based on dated material from the mine adits and nearby historical ruins (e.g. the Qaleh-Bozorg fortress), was traced to the earliest stages of the Sassanid Empire (224-651 AD), and possibly even the latest stages of the Parthian Empire (247 BC-224 AD) (Hallier, 1972; Stöllner and Weisgerber, 2004).

The Gombad and Shaft no. 1 of the Nakhlak mine are nearby undated historical digging sites (which may reach 80 m depth), where smelters and mining tools (e.g. picks, hammers, wooden shoes, lamps, etc.) are still preserved (Pernicka et al. 2011). Old reports on Iranian lead ores, including Nakhlak, can be found in the articles of Vaughan (1896) and Stahl (1897).

More modern mining started in the mid-1930s, in co-operation with German and Austrian engineers and geologists like E. Fischer, E. Bohne, G. Ladame and M. Mazcek. The lead mineralization is situated mainly in the lower part of the Late Cretaceous carbonate rocks at Nakhlak, where sandstones and conglomerates are more common. Many characteristics of the ore deposit fit well with that of the typical Iranian MVT deposits (Rasa, 1987).

The ore bodies occur within dolomites and dolomitized sandy limestones as steeply dipping quartz-calcite-barite veins or vein clusters of massive galena. Their thickness varies from 0.25 to 25 meters and extends up to 500 meters in length; it can be traced down along the dip to 400 meters deep (Romanko et al. 1984). Mining reserves have been estimated at ca. 7 million tons of lead (8.33%), zinc (0.38%) and a considerable amount of silver (72 g/t) (Cherepovsky, Chinakov and Kokorin, 1981). The lead greatly predominates over the zinc and silver contents, suggesting a basinal brine origin or fluid release model for the deposit (Rasa, 1987).

The northern and southern flanks, as well as the deeper levels, offer potential supplementary mining possibilities, where even new ore bodies may be found. The primary ore seems to be monomineralic, consisting solely of galena. Cerussite in various forms is common in the oxidized zone.
