= Cederholm =

Cederholm is a Swedish surname. People with this surname include:

- Andreas Cederholm (born 1990), Swedish handballer
- Anton Cederholm (born 1995), Swedish ice hockey defenceman
- Ivar Cederholm (1902–1982), Norwegian tenor
- Jacob Cederholm (born 1998), Swedish ice hockey defenceman
- Nikolaj Cederholm (born 1963), Danish actor, theatre director, and playwright

== See also ==
- Ceder
