= Cederlund =

Cederlund is a surname. Notable people with the surname include:

- Claes-Göran Cederlund (1948–2020), Swedish radiologist and birdwatcher
- Gösta Cederlund (1888–1980), Swedish actor
