= Chupanan =

Village in Isfahan province, Iran

Chupanan Persian: چوپانان
- Village
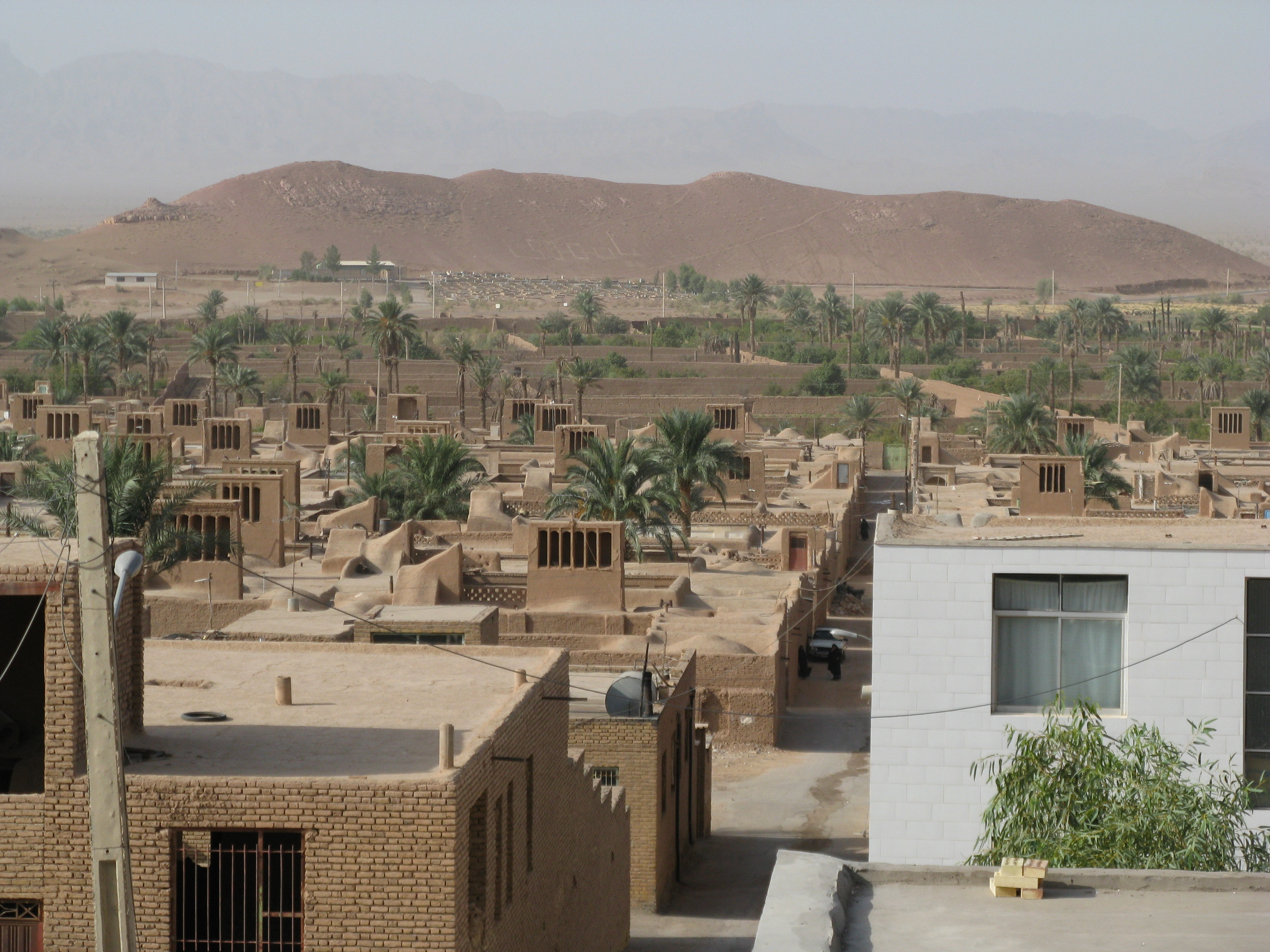
- The village of Chupanan

- Location within Iran
- Coordinates: 33°36′54″N 54°22′46″E
- Country: Iran
- Province: Isfahan
- County: Nain
- District: Anarak
- Rural District: Chupanan

Population (2016)
  - Total: 1,826
- Time zone: UTC+3:30 (IRST)

Chupanan (Persian: چوپانان) (Note: Also romanized as Chūpānān) is a village in, and the capital of, Chupanan Rural District in Anarak District of Nain County, Isfahan province, Iran.

== Demographics ==
=== Population ===
At the time of the 2006 National Census, the village's population was 1,485 in 421 households. The following census in 2011 counted 2,301 people in 601 households. The 2016 census measured the population of the village as 1,826 people in 613 households, the most populous in its rural district.
