= Arazi (surname) =

Arazi (Hebrew: אֲרָזִי Ărāzī, Arabic: أرازي Arāzī) is a Hebrew and Arabic surname. Notable people with the surname include:

- Efi Arazi (1937–2013), Israeli businessman
- Hicham Arazi (born 1973), Moroccan male tennis player
- Reuven Arazi (1907–1983), Israeli politician
- Silvia Arazi (born 1957), Argentine writer and poet
- Yardena Arazi (born 1951), Israeli singer and entertainer
- Yehudah Arazi (1907–1959), Polish Jew active in the Haganah paramilitary in Palestine and the Israel Defense Forces

== See also ==
- Arazi (disambiguation)
