= Anarak =

City in Isfahan province, Iran

Anarak Persian: انارک
- City
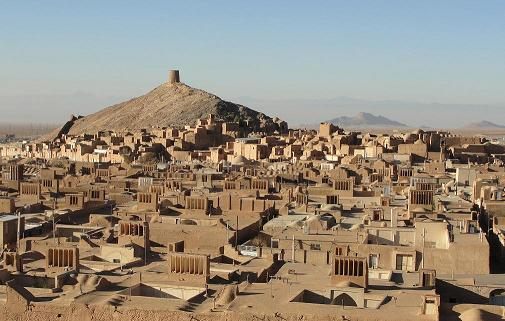
- The city of Anarak

- Location within Iran
- Coordinates: 33°18′32″N 53°41′51″E
- Country: Iran
- Province: Isfahan
- County: Nain
- District: Anarak
- Elevation: 1,429 m (4,688 ft)

Population (2016)
  - Total: 1,903
- Time zone: UTC+3:30 (IRST)
- Website: www.anarak.ir

Anarak (Persian: انارک; Persian pronunciation: [ænɒːˈɾæk]) (Note: Also romanized as Anārak) is a city in, and the capital of, Anarak District in Nain County, Isfahan province, Iran.

== Demographics ==
=== Language ===
The people of Anarak speak a dialect called Anaraki. This language is spoken in the city and localities within 65 kilometres (40 mi) of it, such as Chupanan. There is also a museum in Anarak about its history; books are available with the family tree of families from Anarak.

=== Population ===
At the time of the 2006 National Census, the city's population was 1,285 in 462 households. The following census in 2011 counted 1,477 people in 544 households. The 2016 census measured the population of the city as 1,903 people in 696 households.

== Geography ==
Anarak is at an altitude of 1,429 metres (4,688 ft) at the edge of the "Dasht-e Kavir" and about 75 kilometres (47 mi) from the city of Nain. The city is surrounded by ruins of an old wall and three watchtowers, which were built about 100 years ago to keep Hossein Kashi and his bandit gang out. There is little agriculture in this region, but there are many mines located near Anarak. Nakhlalk, a lead mine, is the largest active mine near Anarak.

Anarak's climate is a typical desert climate, little rainfall, hot dry summer days and cool nights. Most of the old homes are adobe and have a courtyard; people move from south to north of the courtyard from winter to summer.
