= Gijuiyeh, Baft =

Gijuiyeh گيجوئيه
- Village
- Location within Iran
- Coordinates: 29°12′19″N 56°28′04″E
- Country: Iran
- Province: Kerman
- County: Baft
- Bakhsh: Central
- Rural District: Fathabad

Population (2006)
  - Total: 14
- Time zone: UTC+3:30 (IRST)
  - Summer (DST): UTC+4:30 (IRDT)

Gijuiyeh (Persian: گيجوئيه, also Romanized as Gījū‘īyeh; also known as Gījū Galūyeh) is a village in Fathabad Rural District, in the Central District of Baft County, Kerman Province, Iran. At the 2006 census, its population was 14, in 7 families.
