= Arazi Bahirchar Ghoshkati =

Arazi Bahirchar Ghoshkati আরাজ়ি বাহিরচর ঘোষকাটি
- Location in Bangladesh
- Coordinates: 22°51′N 90°18′E
- Country: Bangladesh
- Division: Barisal Division
- District: Barisal District
- Time zone: UTC+6 (Bangladesh Time)

Arazi Bahirchar Ghoshkati (Bengali: আরাজ়ি বাহিরচর ঘোষকাটি, Bengali pronunciation: [aɾazi baɦirtʃɔr ɡʱoʃkaʈi]) is a village in Barisal District in the Barisal Division of southern-central Bangladesh.
