= Chupanan Rural District =

Rural district in Isfahan province, Iran

Chupanan Rural District Persian: دهستان چوپانان
- Rural District
- Location within Iran
- Coordinates: 33°29′N 53°50′E
- Country: Iran
- Province: Isfahan
- County: Nain
- District: Anarak
- Established: 1993
- Capital: Chupanan

Population (2016)
  - Total: 1,917
- Time zone: UTC+3:30 (IRST)

Chupanan Rural District (Persian: دهستان چوپانان) is in Anarak District of Nain County, Isfahan province, Iran. Its capital is the village of Chupanan.

== Demographics ==
=== Population ===
At the time of the 2006 National Census, the rural district's population was 1,619 in 508 households. There were 2,423 inhabitants in 655 households at the following census of 2011. The 2016 census measured the population of the rural district as 1,917 in 633 households. The most populous of its 40 villages was Chupanan, with 1,826 people.

=== Other villages in the rural district ===
- Madan-e Nakhlak
- Mohammadabad
