= Padeh-ye Nowkdari =

- Location in Afghanistan
- Coordinates: 34°53′44″N 62°56′21″E
- Country: Afghanistan
- Province: Badghis Province
- Time zone: + 4.30

Padeh-ye Nowkdari is a village in Badghis Province in north western Afghanistan.
