= Cedergren (surname) =

Cedergren is a Swedish surname.

== Geographical distribution ==
As of 2014, 71.7% of all known bearers of the surname Cedergren were residents of Sweden (frequency 1:8,668), 18.2% of the United States (1:1,254,345), 2.3% of Norway (1:138,982), 1.9% of Canada (1:1,226,600), 1.4% of Denmark (1:256,570) and 1.4% of Finland (1:249,854).

In Sweden, the frequency of the surname was higher than national average (1:8,668) in the following counties:

1. Gotland County (1:790)
2. Södermanland County (1:4,899)
3. Dalarna County (1:4,909)
4. Skåne County (1:5,806)
5. Stockholm County (1:6,840)
6. Kalmar County (1:6,952)
7. Blekinge County (1:6,997)
8. Örebro County (1:7,708)

== Notable people ==
- Abel Cedergren (born 2009), Norwegian footballer
- Hugo Cedergren (1891–1971), Swedish scouting executive
- Jakob Cedergren (born 1973), Swedish-born Danish actor
- Joel Cedergren (born 1974), Swedish football manager and former player
