= Shomilan, Khuzestan =

Shomilan شميلان
- Village
- Location within Iran
- Coordinates: 31°07′31″N 49°53′57″E
- Country: Iran
- Province: Khuzestan
- County: Ramhormoz
- Bakhsh: Central
- Rural District: Abolfares

Population (2006)
  - Total: 174
- Time zone: UTC+3:30 (IRST)
  - Summer (DST): UTC+4:30 (IRDT)

Shomilan (Persian: شميلان, also Romanized as Shomīlān) is a village in Abolfares Rural District, in the Central District of Ramhormoz County, Khuzestan Province, Iran. At the 2006 census, its population was 174, in 35 families.
