= Omruduiyeh, Baft =

Omruduiyeh امرودوييه
- Village
- Location within Iran
- Coordinates: 29°06′59″N 56°44′42″E
- Country: Iran
- Province: Kerman
- County: Baft
- Bakhsh: Central
- Rural District: Bezenjan

Population (2006)
  - Total: 98
- Time zone: UTC+3:30 (IRST)
  - Summer (DST): UTC+4:30 (IRDT)

Omruduiyeh (Persian: امرودوييه, also Romanized as Omrūdūīyeh and Omrūdūeeyeh) is a village in Bezenjan Rural District, in the Central District of Baft County, Kerman Province, Iran. At the time of the 2006 census, its population was 98, in 21 families.
