= Padeh-ye Laghari =

- Location in Afghanistan
- Coordinates: 34°53′13″N 62°52′58″E
- Country: Afghanistan
- Province: Badghis Province
- Time zone: + 4.30

Padeh-ye Laghari is a village in Badghis Province in north western Afghanistan.
