= Silvia Arazi =

Argentine writer, poet and singer

Silvia Arazi is an Argentine writer, poet and singer.

== Career ==
Her short story collection, Qué temprano anochece, won the Premio Julio Cortázar in 1998. Her novel La maestra de canto has been translated into German and Dutch, and was adapted into a movie by Ariel Broitman in 2013. She has also written works of poetry and books for children.

== Personal life ==
She lives in Buenos Aires and Colonia del Sacramento.
