= Arzuiyeh =

City in Kerman province, Iran

Arzuiyeh Persian: ارزوئیه
- City
- Location within Iran
- Coordinates: 28°27′11″N 56°22′00″E
- Country: Iran
- Province: Kerman
- County: Arzuiyeh
- District: Central

Population (2016)
  - Total: 6,868
- Time zone: UTC+3:30 (IRST)

Arzuiyeh (Persian: ارزوئيه) (Note: Also romanized as Arzoo’eyeh, Arzū’īyeh, ‘Orsū’īyeh, Orzū’īyeh, and Ozū’īyeh; also known as Ārzū; formerly the village of Shahmaran) is a city in the Central District of Arzuiyeh County, Kerman province, Iran, serving as capital of both the county and the district. It is also the administrative center for Arzuiyeh Rural District.

== History ==
The village of Shahmaran in Baft County was elevated to city status as Arzuiyeh in 1997.

== Demographics ==
=== Population ===
At the time of the 2006 National Census, the city's population was 5,668 in 1,286 households, when it was in capital of the former Arzuiyeh District of Baft County. The following census in 2011 counted 7,555 people in 1,888 households, by which time the district had been separated from the county in the establishment of Arzuiyeh County. The city and the rural district were transferred to the new Central District, with Arzuiyeh as the county's capital. The 2016 census measured the population of the city as 6,868 people in 1,958 households.
