= Padeh, Kohgiluyeh and Boyer-Ahmad =

Padeh پاده
- Village
- Location within Iran
- Coordinates: 30°50′12″N 50°50′29″E
- Country: Iran
- Province: Kohgiluyeh and Boyer-Ahmad
- County: Charam
- Bakhsh: Sarfaryab
- Rural District: Sarfaryab

Population (2006)
  - Total: 280
- Time zone: UTC+3:30 (IRST)
  - Summer (DST): UTC+4:30 (IRDT)

Padeh (Persian: پاده, also Romanized as Pādeh) is a village in Sarfaryab Rural District, Sarfaryab District, Charam County, Kohgiluyeh and Boyer-Ahmad Province, Iran. At the 2006 census, its population was 280, in 53 families.
