= Zederbaum =

Zederbaum, Cederbaum (Russian: Цедерба́ум) are surnames of:

- Aleksander Zederbaum (1816–1893), Polish-Russian Jewish journalist
- Julius Zederbaum (1873–1923), Russian politician and revolutionary

== Cederbaum ==
- Henryk Cederbaum (1863–1928), Polish lawyer
- Lorenz S. Cederbaum (born 1946), German physical chemist
