= Arazi Masnali =

Mohra Dhamial
- Village
- Location within Pakistan
- Coordinates: 33.22°N 73.17°E
- Country: Pakistan
- Province: (Islamabad Capital Territory) Islamabad C.T
- Elevation: 497 m (1,631 ft)

Population
  - Total: 108,974
- Time zone: UTC+5 (PST)

Arazi Masnali is a village in the Islamabad Capital Territory of Pakistan. It is located at 33° 22' 10N 73° 17' 50E with an altitude of 497 metres (1633 feet).
