= Dahan (surname) =

Dahan is a surname. Notable people with the surname include:

- Amy Dahan, French mathematician and historian of mathematics and climate change
- Dudu Dahan, former Israeli football player
- Mor Dahan, Israeli football player
- Nissim Dahan, Israeli politician
- Olivier Dahan, French film director and screenwriter
- Theodosius V Dahan, 18th-century patriarch of Melkite Greek Catholic Church
