= Erez (disambiguation) =

Erez is a kibbutz in south-western Israel.

Erez may also refer to:

== Places ==
- Kibbutz Erez
- Erez Crossing, a pedestrian/cargo terminal on the Israeli Gaza Strip barrier
- Neveh Erez, also known as Mitzpe Erez, an Israeli "settlement outpost" in the West Bank
- Erez Industrial Estate, a part of the Valley of Peace initiative
- Historical name of Erzincan

== Given name ==
- Erez, pseudonym of journalist Aleksander Zederbaum
- Erez Lieberman Aiden (born 1980), American research scientist and mathematician
- Erez Biton (born 1942), Hebrew poet
- Erez Edelstein (born 1961), Israeli basketball coach
- Erez Eisen, an Israeli music producer, part of the electronica music duo Infected Mushroom
- Erez Katz (born 1980), Israeli basketball player
- Erez Markovich (born 1978), Israeli basketball player
- Erez Mesika (born 1979), Israeli professional football (soccer) player
- Erez Shemesh (born 1970), Israeli Olympic competitive sailor
- Erez Tal (born 1961), Israeli announcer and TV presenter

== Surname ==
- Arnon Erez (born 1965), Israeli pianist and chamber musician
- Guy Erez, Israeli–American songwriter and producer
- Kelly Erez, English singer-songwriter
- Noga Erez (born 1989), Israeli singer, songwriter and producer

== Other uses ==
- Erez Battalion, a security examination battalion in the Military Police Corps of the Israeli Defense Forces
- The 2004 Erez Crossing bombing on the Israeli Gaza Strip barrier
