= Sangabad, Rigan =

Sangabad سنگ اباد
- Village
- Location within Iran
- Coordinates: 28°35′00″N 58°57′00″E
- Country: Iran
- Province: Kerman
- County: Rigan
- Bakhsh: Central
- Rural District: Rigan

Population (2006)
  - Total: 24
- Time zone: UTC+3:30 (IRST)
  - Summer (DST): UTC+4:30 (IRDT)

Sangabad (Persian: سنگ اباد, also Romanized as Sangābād; also known as Sanqābād) is a village in Rigan Rural District, in the Central District of Rigan County, Kerman Province, Iran. At the 2006 census, its population was 24, in 4 families.
