= Hoseynabad-e Khani, Sirjan =

Hoseynabad-e Khani حسين ابادخاني
- Village
- Location within Iran
- Coordinates: 29°25′15″N 55°37′38″E
- Country: Iran
- Province: Kerman
- County: Sirjan
- Bakhsh: Central
- Rural District: Sharifabad

Population (2006)
  - Total: 15
- Time zone: UTC+3:30 (IRST)
  - Summer (DST): UTC+4:30 (IRDT)

Hoseynabad-e Khani (Persian: حسين ابادخاني, also Romanized as Ḩoseynābād-e Khānī; also known as Ḩoseynābād) is a village in Sharifabad Rural District, in the Central District of Sirjan County, Kerman Province, Iran. At the 2006 census, its population was 15, in 5 families.
