= Claes-Göran Cederlund =

Swedish radiologist and birdwatcher (1948–2020)

Claes-Göran Cederlund (21 August 1948 - 15 November 2020) was a Swedish radiologist and birdwatcher.

Cederlund is known for his record-making "life list" of different birds observed. His total reached 9,761 or 9,770, according to two different counts, making him top-ranked on both. Cederlund's total continued to increase posthumously, due to updates in the official listings of bird species.

In the course of his birdwatching pursuits, Cederlund visited over 135 countries. He died on 15 November 2020 at the age of 72.
