= Vakilabad Rural District =

Rural district in Kerman province, Iran

Vakilabad Rural District Persian: دهستان وكيل آباد
- Rural District
- Location within Iran
- Coordinates: 28°24′53″N 56°05′38″E
- Country: Iran
- Province: Kerman
- County: Arzuiyeh
- District: Central
- Capital: Vakilabad

Population (2016)
  - Total: 5,831
- Time zone: UTC+3:30 (IRST)

Vakilabad Rural District (Persian: دهستان وكيل آباد) is in the Central District of Arzuiyeh County, Kerman province, Iran. Its capital is the village of Vakilabad.

== Demographics ==
=== Population ===
At the time of the 2006 National Census, the rural district's population (as a part of the former Arzuiyeh District of Baft County) was 7,786 in 1,715 households. There were 7,895 inhabitants in 2,129 households at the following census of 2011, by which time the district had been separated from the county in the establishment of Arzuiyeh County. The rural district was transferred to the new Central District. The 2016 census measured the population of the rural district as 5,831 in 1,705 households. The most populous of its 32 villages was Vakilabad, with 2,537 people.
