= Anarak District =

District in Isfahan province, Iran

Anarak District Persian: بخش انارک
- District
- Location within Iran
- Coordinates: 33°29′N 53°50′E
- Country: Iran
- Province: Isfahan
- County: Nain
- Capital: Anarak

Population (2016)
  - Total: 3,820
- Time zone: UTC+3:30 (IRST)

Anarak District (Persian: بخش انارک) is in Nain County, Isfahan province, Iran. Its capital is the city of Anarak.

== Demographics ==
=== Language ===
The district has a local dialect related to that spoken in the county.

=== Population ===
At the time of the 2006 National Census, the district's population was 2,904 in 970 households. The following census in 2011 counted 3,900 people in 1,199 households. The 2016 census measured the population of the district as 3,820 inhabitants in 1,329 households.

=== Administrative divisions ===
Anarak District Population
Administrative Divisions	2006	2011	2016
Chupanan RD	1,619	2,423	1,917
Anarak (city)	1,285	1,477	1,903
Total	2,904	3,900	3,820
RD = Rural District
