= Arzuiyeh District =

Former district in Kerman province, Iran

Arzuiyeh District Persian: بخش ارزوئیه
- Former District
- Location within Iran
- Coordinates: 28°28′N 56°32′E
- Country: Iran
- Province: Kerman
- County: Baft
- Capital: Arzuiyeh

Population (2006)
  - Total: 36,859
- Time zone: UTC+3:30 (IRST)

Arzuiyeh District (Persian: بخش ارزوئیه) is a former administrative division of Baft County, Kerman province, Iran. Its capital was the city of Arzuiyeh. (Note: Formerly the village of Shahmaran)

== History ==
After the 2006 National Census, the district and Dehsard Rural District of the Central District were separated from the county in the establishment of Arzuiyeh County.

== Demographics ==
=== Population ===
At the time of the 2006 census, the district's population was 36,859 in 8,204 households.

=== Administrative divisions ===
Arzuiyeh District Population
Administrative Divisions	2006
Arzuiyeh RD	13,656
Soghan RD	9,749
Vakilabad RD	7,786
Arzuiyeh (city)	5,668
Total	36,859
RD = Rural District
