= Arzuiyeh Rural District =

Rural district in Kerman province, Iran

Arzuiyeh Rural District Persian: دهستان ارزوئيه
- Rural District
- Location within Iran
- Coordinates: 28°21′30″N 56°28′19″E
- Country: Iran
- Province: Kerman
- County: Arzuiyeh
- District: Central
- Capital: Arzuiyeh

Population (2016)
  - Total: 12,437
- Time zone: UTC+3:30 (IRST)

Arzuiyeh Rural District (Persian: دهستان ارزوئيه) is in the Central District of Arzuiyeh County, Kerman province, Iran. It is administered from the city of Arzuiyeh. (Note: Formerly the village of Shahmaran)

== Demographics ==
=== Population ===
At the time of the 2006 National Census, the rural district's population (as a part of the former Arzuiyeh District of Baft County) was 13,656 in 3,153 households. There were 13,133 inhabitants in 3,513 households at the following census of 2011, by which time the district had been separated from the county in the establishment of Arzuiyeh County. The rural district was transferred to the new Central District. The 2016 census measured the population of the rural district as 12,437 in 3,670 households. The most populous of its 130 villages was Dowlatabad, with 3,111 people.
