= Soghan District =

District in Kerman province, Iran

Soghan District Persian: بخش صوغان
- District
- Location within Iran
- Coordinates: 28°23′55″N 56°48′28″E
- Country: Iran
- Province: Kerman
- County: Arzuiyeh
- Capital: Rustai-ye Aliabad

Population (2016)
  - Total: 9,174
- Time zone: UTC+3:30 (IRST)

Soghan District (Persian: بخش صوغان) is in Arzuiyeh County, Kerman province, Iran. Its capital is the village of Rustai-ye Aliabad.

== History ==
After the 2006 National Census, Arzuiyeh District and Dehsard Rural District were separated from Baft County in the establishment of Arzuiyeh County, which was divided into two districts and five rural districts, with Arzuiyeh as its capital and only city.

== Demographics ==
=== Population ===
At the time of the 2011 census, the district's population was 8,803 people in 2,192 households. The 2016 census measured the population of the district as 9,174 inhabitants in 2,572 households.

=== Administrative divisions ===
Soghan District Population
Administrative Divisions	2011	2016
Amirabad RD	5,490	5,154
Soghan RD	3,313	4,020
Total	8,803	9,174
RD = Rural District
