= Soghan Rural District =

Rural district in Kerman province, Iran

Soghan Rural District Persian: دهستان صوغان
- Rural District
- Location within Iran
- Coordinates: 28°23′18″N 56°42′24″E
- Country: Iran
- Province: Kerman
- County: Arzuiyeh
- District: Soghan
- Capital: Sorkhan

Population (2016)
  - Total: 4,020
- Time zone: UTC+3:30 (IRST)

Soghan Rural District (Persian: دهستان صوغان) is in Soghan District of Arzuiyeh County, Kerman province, Iran. Its capital is the village of Sorkhan.

== Demographics ==
=== Population ===
At the time of the 2006 National Census, the rural district's population (as a part of the former Arzuiyeh District of Baft County) was 9,749 in 2,050 households. There were 3,313 inhabitants in 765 households at the following census of 2011, by which time the district had been separated from the county in the establishment of Arzuiyeh County. The rural district was transferred to the new Soghan District. The 2016 census measured the population of the rural district as 4,020 in 1,099 households. The most populous of its 10 villages was Rustai-ye Aliabad, with 1,779 people.
