= Dehsard Rural District =

Rural district in Kerman province, Iran

Dehsard Rural District Persian: دهستان دهسرد
- Rural District
- Location within Iran
- Coordinates: 28°36′54″N 56°36′29″E
- Country: Iran
- Province: Kerman
- County: Arzuiyeh
- District: Central
- Capital: Patkan

Population (2016)
  - Total: 4,200
- Time zone: UTC+3:30 (IRST)

Dehsard Rural District (Persian: دهستان دهسرد) is in the Central District of Arzuiyeh County, Kerman province, Iran. Its capital is the village of Patkan.

== Demographics ==
=== Population ===
At the time of the 2006 National Census, the rural district's population (as a part of the Central District of Baft County) was 3,527 in 874 households. There were 4,589 inhabitants in 1,192 households at the following census of 2011, by which time the rural district had been separated from the county in the establishment of Arzuiyeh County. It was transferred to the new Central District. The 2016 census measured the population of the rural district as 4,200 in 1,237 households. The most populous of its 82 villages was Jughan, with 967 people.
