= Central District (Arzuiyeh County) =

District in Kerman province, Iran

Central District (Arzuiyeh County) Persian: بخش مرکزی شهرستان ارزوئیه
- District
- Location within Iran
- Coordinates: 28°28′13″N 56°25′07″E
- Country: Iran
- Province: Kerman
- County: Arzuiyeh
- Capital: Arzuiyeh

Population (2016)
  - Total: 29,336
- Time zone: UTC+3:30 (IRST)

The Central District of Arzuiyeh County (Persian: بخش مرکزی شهرستان ارزوئیه) is in Kerman province, Iran. Its capital is the city of Arzuiyeh. (Note: Formerly the village of Shahmaran)

== History ==
After the 2006 National Census, Arzuiyeh District and Dehsard Rural District were separated from Baft County in the establishment of Arzuiyeh County, which was divided into two districts and five rural districts, with Arzuiyeh as its capital and only city.

== Demographics ==
=== Population ===
At the time of the 2011 census, the district's population was 33,176 people in 8,722 households. The 2016 census measured the population of the district as 29,336 inhabitants in 8,570 households.

=== Administrative divisions ===
Central District (Arzuiyeh County) Population
Administrative Divisions	2011	2016
Arzuiyeh RD	13,137	12,437
Dehsard RD	4,589	4,200
Vakilabad RD	7,895	5,831
Arzuiyeh (city)	7,555	6,868
Total	33,176	29,336
RD = Rural District
