= Arzuiyeh County =

County in Kerman province, Iran

Arzuiyeh County Persian: شهرستان ارزوئیه
- County
- Location of Arzuiyeh County in Kerman province (center left, pink)

- Location of Kerman province in Iran
- Coordinates: 28°28′N 56°32′E
- Country: Iran
- Province: Kerman
- Capital: Arzuiyeh
- Districts: Central, Soghan

Population (2016)
  - Total: 38,510
- Time zone: UTC+3:30 (IRST)

Arzuiyeh County (Persian: شهرستان ارزوئیه) is in Kerman province, Iran. Its capital is the city of Arzuiyeh. (Note: Formerly the village of Shahmaran)

== History ==
After the 2006 National Census, Arzuiyeh District and Dehsard Rural District were separated from Baft County in the establishment of Arzuiyeh County, which was divided into two districts and five rural districts, with Arzuiyeh as its capital and only city.

== Demographics ==
=== Population ===
At the time of the 2011 census, the county's population was 41,979 people in 10,899 households. The 2016 census measured the population of the county as 38,510 in 11,142 households.

=== Administrative divisions ===
Arzuiyeh County's population history and administrative structure over two consecutive censuses are shown in the following table.

Arzuiyeh County Population
Administrative Divisions	2011	2016
Central District	33,176	29,336
Arzuiyeh RD	13,137	12,437
Dehsard RD	4,589	4,200
Vakilabad RD	7,895	5,831
Arzuiyeh (city)	7,555	6,868
Soghan District	8,803	9,174
Amirabad RD	5,490	5,154
Soghan RD	3,313	4,020
Total	41,979	38,510
RD = Rural District

== See also ==
Media related to Arzuiyeh County at Wikimedia Commons
