= Daran =

Daran or Darran may refer to:

== People ==
=== Given name Daran ===
- Daran Boonyasak (born 1979), Thai actress
- Daran Kravanh, Cambodian-American musician and politician
- Daran Little (born 1966), BAFTA Award-winning British television writer
- Daran Norris (born 1964), American actor
- Daran Ponter (born 1968), New Zealand regional politician

=== Given name Darran ===
- Darran Harris (born 1992), Welsh rugby union player
- Darran Hay (born 1969), English footballer
- Darran Kempson (born 1984), English footballer
- Darran Lindsay (1971–2006), Northern Irish motorcycle road racer
- Darran O'Sullivan (born 1986), British-Irish Gaelic footballer
- Darran Rowbotham (born 1966), Welsh footballer
- Darran Thomson (born 1984), Scottish footballer

== Places ==
- Daran, Azerbaijan, village in the Bilasuvar Rayon
- Darantaleh, a town in the northern Sool region of Somalia
- Darran Mountains, Fiordland, New Zealand
- Darran Valley, community in Wales

=== Places in Iran ===
- Daran, Iran, also romanized as Dārān, city and capital of Faridan County, Isfahan Province
- Daran, East Azerbaijan, also romanized as Dārān, also known as Dārānā, village in Jolfa County, East Azerbaijan Province
- Pashneh Daran, also romanized as Pāshneh Dārān; also known as Pāshneh Dar, Pāshneh Darū, and Pāshteh Darān, a village in Dastgerdan Rural District, Dastgerdan District, Tabas County, South Khorasan Province
- Daran Darreh, also romanized as Dūrān Darreh, Darrān Darreh, Darān Darreh, Darun Darreh, and Dowrān Darreh, a village in Hemmatabad Rural District, in the Central District of Borujerd County, Lorestan Province

==== Places in Kerman Province, Iran ====
- Dahan-e Daran, also romanized as Dahan-e Darān; also known as Deh-e Darān, a village in Marz Rural District, Chah Dadkhoda District, Qaleh Ganj County
- Ti Daran, also romanized as Tī Darān, a village in Nargesan Rural District, Jebalbarez-e Jonubi District, Anbarabad County

== See also ==
- Seh Daran (disambiguation)
- Deh-e Daran (disambiguation)
- Darren
- Darin (disambiguation)
- Daron
- Darron
