= Darin =

Darin may refer to

== Places ==
- Darin, Anbarabad, a village in Kerman Province, Iran
- Darin, Jebalbarez-e Jonubi, a village in Kerman Province, Iran
- Darin, Sistan and Baluchestan, a village in Sistan and Baluchestan Province, Iran
- Darin, Yazd, a village in Yazd Province, Iran
- Darin, the main harbour on Tarout Island, Saudi Arabia, and an alternate name for the island itself

== Music ==
- Darin (singer), a Swedish singer of Kurdish descent, full name Darin Zanyar
  - Darin (album), 2015, the second studio album by Swedish singer/songwriter Darin

== Other uses ==
- Darin (name), a given name and surname
- Treaty of Darin, a 1915 treaty between Ibn Saud and the United Kingdom

== See also ==
- Daran (disambiguation)
- Daren, Taitung, a township in Taiwan
- Darien (disambiguation)
- Darren, a male given name
- Dıryan or Darian, a village in Azerbaijan
- Muhammad bin Abdul Wahhab Al Faihani Palace
