= Daren (disambiguation) =

Daren is a settlement in Trefeurig, Ceredigion, Wales.

Daren may also refer to:

- Daren, Taitung, Taiwan, a township
- Daren (given name), a masculine given name of uncertain etymological origins
- Daren Cars, an automobile manufacturer - see Daren Mk.1

== See also ==
- Dairen, Liaoning province, China
- Darien (disambiguation)
- Darin (disambiguation)
