= Deh-e Daran =

Deh-e Daran or Deh Daran or Dehdaran (Persian: دهداران or ده دران) may refer to:

- Dehdaran-e Olya, Bushehr Province
- Dehdaran-e Sofla, Bushehr Province
- Deh-e Daran, Kerman (ده دران - Deh-e Darān)
- Deh-e Daran, alternate name of Dahan-e Daran, Kerman Province (ده دران - Deh-e Darān)
- Deh-e Daran, Khuzestan (دهداران - Deh-e Dārān)
