= Darren =

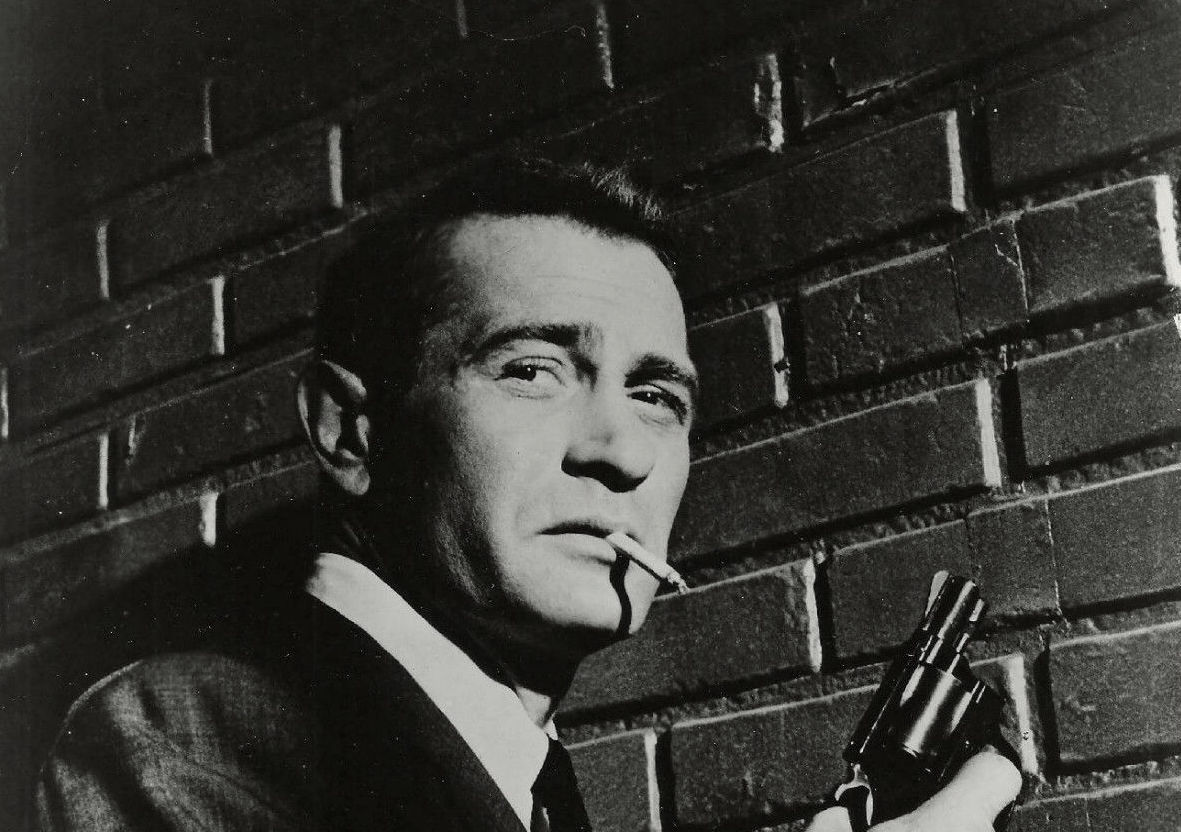
- Actor Darren McGavin
- Pronunciation: /dærən/
- Gender: Male

Other names
- Nicknames: Daz, Dazza
- Related names: Darin, Darrin, Darrell, Darragh, Dáire

Darren is a masculine given name of uncertain etymological origins. Some theories state that it originated from an Anglicisation of the Irish first name Darragh or Dáire, meaning "oak tree". According to other sources, it is thought to come from the Gaelic surname meaning "great", but is also linked to a Welsh mountain named Moel Darren. It is also believed to be a variant of Darrell, which originated from the French surname D'Airelle, meaning "of Airelle". The common spelling of Darren is found in the Welsh language, meaning "edge": Black Darren and Red Darren are found on the eastern side of the Hatterrall Ridge, west of Long Town. In New Zealand, the Darran Mountains are in the south of the country.

The name increased in use for boys after American author Zane Grey used the name Daren Lane for the hero of his 1922 novel The Beast; a number of American parents used the full name of the character, Daren Lane, as first and middle names for their sons. While the name is also in use as a surname, Grey might have coined the name for his character. Later, the name and its spelling variants increased in use in the 1960s and early 1970s due to various media influences including the popularity of actor Darren McGavin, actor and musician Bobby Darin, and the fictional character Darrin Stephens on the American television series Bewitched. Darren has several spelling variations including Daren, Darin, Daryn, Darrin, Darran and Darryn.

In the United Kingdom, its popularity peaked during the 1970s but declined sharply afterwards. In England and Wales, it first appeared in the early 1960s, ranking 66th in 1964, and had leapt to 15th by 1974, but fell to 33rd by 1984 and last appeared in the top 100 in 1994, when it ranked 100th.

== People ==
=== Arts and entertainment ===
- Darren Aronofsky, American filmmaker
- Darren Barnet, American actor
- Darren Bennett (dancer), British professional dancer
- Darren Bett, British weatherman for the BBC
- Darren Boyd, British actor
- Darren Criss, American actor and singer
- Darren Cullen (cartoonist), British satirical artist and writer
- Darren Dale, Australian filmmaker
- Darren Day, English actor, singer, and television presenter
- Darren Espanto, Filipino-Canadian singer
- Darren Farris, American singer/songwriter
- Darren Floyd, British writer, painter and puppeteer
- Darren Grant, American film and music video director
- Darren Hayes, Australian singer-songwriter, formerly of the group Savage Garden
- Darren Jessee, American drummer for the rock group Ben Folds Five
- Darren Jordon, British journalist and newsreader
- Darren Kennedy, Irish television presenter and entrepreneur based in London
- Darren Korb, American songwriter and composer
- Darren Leader, stage name Stix Zadinia, American drummer for the rock group Steel Panther
- Darren Lim, Singaporean actor
- Darren McGavin, American actor
- Darren McMullen, Scottish-Australian television and radio personality
- Darren Ockert, British singer-songwriter and producer based out of Miami
- Darren Robinson (rapper), American member of the 80s rap group The Fat Boys
- Darren O'Shaughnessy, Irish writer and novelist
- Darren "Whackhead" Simpson (born 1977), South African radio presenter
- Darren Star, American television/film producer and screenwriter
- Darren Styles, British record producer, disc jockey and singer-songwriter
- Darren Tate, British trance music producer and DJ
- Darren Watkins Jr., American online streamer
- Darren Wilson (musician), American drummer of the indie-rock group The Hush South

=== Politics ===
- Darren Chester, Australian politician
- Darren Hughes, New Zealand politician
- Darren Soto, American politician
- Darren Thorne, American politician

=== Sports ===
- Darren Anderton, English footballer
- Darren Andrews (born 1995), American football player
- Darren Bennett (football player), Australian who played both Australian rules football and American football
- Darren Bent, English footballer
- Darren Braithwaite, British sprinter
- Darren Bravo, West Indian cricketer
- Darren Beadman (born 1965), Australian jockey
- Darren Byfield, English footballer
- Darren Campbell, English sprint athlete
- Darren Collins (footballer born 1967), English footballer
- Darren Collison, American basketball player
- Darren Clarke, Irish professional golfer
- Darren Currie, English footballer
- Darren Daulton, American baseball player
- Darren Daye (born 1960), American basketball player
- Darren Dreger (born 1968), Canadian sports broadcaster
- Darren Drozdov (1969–2023), American professional wrestler
- Darren Erman, American basketball coach
- Darren Evans former football player
- Darren Fells, American football player
- Darren Fenn, American basketball player
- Darren Ferguson, Scottish footballer and manager
- Darren Fletcher, Scottish footballer
- Darren Flutie, American football player
- Darren Gerard (born 1984), English cricketer
- Darren Gilford, Maltese sprinter
- Darren Gough, English cricketer
- Darren Hall (disambiguation)
- Darren Harland (born 1979), English cricketer
- Darren Huckerby, English footballer
- Darren Hughes (English footballer), English footballer
- Darren Hughes (Gaelic footballer), Irish Gaelic footballer
- Darren Hughes (gridiron football), American football player
- Darren Jarman, Australian rules footballer
- Darren Kelly (born 1979), Northern Irish footballer
- Darren Lockyer, Australian rugby league footballer
- Darren Lange, Australian freestyle swimmer
- Darren Mackie, Scottish footballer
- Darren Matthews, best known as William Regal, English professional wrestler
- Darren McCarty, Canadian ice hockey player
- Darren McCaughan, American baseball player
- Darren Mead (born 1971), Australian rules footballer
- Darren Murphy, Irish footballer
- Darren Ng, China-Australian basketball player
- Darren O'Dea, Irish footballer
- Darren Pang, Canadian ice hockey goaltender
- Darryn Peterson (born 2007), American basketball player
- Darren Purse, English footballer
- Darren Ritchie (long jumper), Scottish long jumper
- Darren Rumble, Canadian ice hockey player
- Darren Rumble (footballer), Australian rules footballer
- Darren Sharper, American football player
- Darren Smith (rugby league), Australian rugby league player
- Darren Sproles, American football player
- Darren Tetley, English boxer
- Darren Till, British mixed martial artist
- Darren Turcotte, American ice hockey player
- Darren Twombly (born 1965), American football player
- Darren Waller, American football player
- Darren Webster, British darts player
- Darren Wood, English footballer
- Darren Yewchyn, Canadian football player
- Darren Young, ring name of American professional wrestler Fred Rosser

=== Other fields ===
- Darren Naish, British vertebrate palaeontologist and science writer
- Darren Storsley, founder of Top Teen of Canada
- Darren Kimura, American businessman, inventor and investor
- Darren Deon Vann, American serial killer
- Darren Woods, American businessman, CEO and chairman of ExxonMobil
- Darren Tanke, Canadian vertebrate paleontology field and lab technician, Royal Tyrrell Museum of Palaeontology

== Fictional characters ==
- Darren Cross, supervillain 'Yellowjacket' from the Marvel comic series Marvel MCU movie Ant-Man
- Darren Osborne, in the British soap opera Hollyoaks
- Darren Shan, main character of The Saga of Darren Shan novel and manga series

== See also ==
- Derren, a given name
- Derrin, a given name
- Darin (name), a given name and surname
- Daron, a given name and surname
- Darron, a given name
