= Darian =

Darian may refer to:

== People ==
=== Surname ===
- Anita Darian (1927–2015), American singer
- Yeghishe Darian, Lebanese footballer

=== Given name ===
- Darian Barnes (born 1980), American football player
- Darrian Beavers (born 1999), American football player
- Darian "Duce" Chestnut (born 2002), American football player
- Darian Cowgill (born 1972), American audio engineer
- Darian DeVries (born 1975), American basketball coach
- Darian Durant (born 1982), American football player
- Darian Forbes (born 1984), Turks and Caicos Islands sprinter
- Darian Grubb (born 1975), American NASCAR mechanic and racing crew chief
- Darian Hagan (born 1970), American football player
- Darian Jenkins (born 1995), female American soccer player
- Darian Faisury Jiménez (born 2000), Colombian Paralympic athlete
- Darian King (born 1992), Barbadian tennis player
- Darian Kinnard (born 1999), American football player
- Darian Lane, American music video director
- Darian Leader (born 1965), British psychoanalyst
- Darian Mensah, American football player
- Darian Sahanaja, Indonesian musician
- Darian Stevens (born 1996), female American Olympic freestyle skier
- Darian Stewart (born 1988), American football player
- Darian Thompson (born 1993), American football player
- Darian Townsend (born 1984), South African swimmer

=== Characters ===
- Darian Firkin, a fictional character in several novels by Mercedes Lackey
- Darian Hallenbeck, a child character in the film The Last Boy Scout

== Places ==
- Darian, Iran, a city in Fars Province, Iran
- Darian, Kermanshah, a village in Kermanshah Province, Iran
- Daryan, East Azerbaijan, a village in East Azerbaijan Province, Iran
- Darian Rural District, in Fars Province, Iran

== Other uses ==
- Darian calendar, a proposed system of timekeeping for the planet Mars

== See also ==
- Darien (disambiguation)
- Darion (disambiguation)
- Dıryan, Lankaran Rayon, Azerbaijan
