= Seh Daran =

Seh Daran or Seh Deran (Persian: سه دران) may refer to:

- Seh Daran, Bam, a village in Deh Bakri Rural District, in the Central District of Bam County, Kerman Province, Iran
- Seh Deran, Jiroft, a village in Sarduiyeh Rural District, Sarduiyeh District, Jiroft County, Kerman Province, Iran
