= Sedran =

Sedran may refer to:

- Barney Sedran (1891-1964), American Hall of Fame basketball player
- Sedran, Iran, a village in Kerman Province, Iran
