= Daryn =

Daryn is a masculine given name which may refer to:

- Daryn Colledge (born 1982), American former National Football League player
- Daryn Cresswell (born 1971), former Australian rules footballer
- Daryn Dupavillon (born 1994), South African cricketer
- Daryn Jones (born 1978), Canadian comedian and radio and television personality
- Daryn Kagan, American broadcast journalist and former CNN news anchor
- Daryn Okada (born 1960), American cinematographer
- Daryn Pittman (born 1978), American semi-retired professional racing driver
- Daryn Smit (born 1984), South African retired cricketer

== See also ==
- Derryn Hinch (1944–2026), New Zealand-born media personality, politician, actor, journalist and author
- Darren
- Darin (name)
