= Darren (surname) =

Darren is a surname. Notable people with the surname include:

- Eva Darren (born 1946), Filipina actress
- James Darren, stage name of American actor James Ercolani (1936–2024)
- Jenny Darren, British rock singer born Jennifer Harley (fl. 1962–present)
- Kurt Darren, South African singer, songwriter and television presenter born Kurt van Heerden (born 1970)

== See also ==
- Darrin (name), a list of people and fictional characters with the given name or surname
