= Derrin =

Derrin is a given name which may refer to:

- Derrin Ebert (born 1976), American former Major League Baseball pitcher
- Derrin Hansen (born 1967), American college basketball coach
- Derrin Horton, American sportscaster and voice actor
- Derrin Lamker (born c. 1975), American college football coach
- Derrin Owens, American politician
- Derrin Schlesinger (fl. 1990–present), British film and television producer

== See also ==
- Darren, a given name
- Darin (name), a given name and surname
- Derren, a given name
