= Daron =

Daron is a given name and surname. In Western Armenian, Daron is an alternative to the Armenian name Taron. Notable people with the name include:

== Given name ==
=== Daron ===
- Daron Acemoglu (born 1967), Armenian-American economist
- Daron Alcorn (born 1971), American football player
- Daron Beneby (born 1984), Bahamian soccer player
- Daron Clark (born 1985), American football player
- Daron Council (born 1964), American sprinter
- Daron Cruickshank (born 1985), American mixed martial artist
- Daron Cruickshank (cricketer) (born 1986), Trinidadian cricketer
- Daron Hagen (born 1961), American composer
- Daron Kirkreit (born 1972), American baseball pitcher
- Daron Joffe (born 1975), agribusiness and nonprofit executive
- Daron Jones (born 1976), American singer-songwriter
- Daron Ker, Cambodian-American filmmaker
- Daron Malakian (born 1975), Armenian-American musician
- Daron Murphy, film composer and musician
- Daron Norwood (1965–2015), American country music singer
- Daron Payne (born 1997), American football player
- Daron Roberts (born 1978), American football coach
- Daron Rahlves (born 1971), American alpine skier
- Daron Schoenrock (born 1961), American college basketball coach
- Daron Sutton (born 1969), American sports announcer

=== DaRon ===
- DaRon Bland (born 1999), American football player
- DaRon Gilbert (born 2001), American football player
- DaRon Holmes, American basketball player
- DaRon McGee, American politician

== Surname ==
- Anatoliy Daron (1926–2020), Russian rocket engineer and scientist
- David Daron (1397–1410), Dean of Bangor
- Lewys Daron (fl. c. 1495–c. 1530), Welsh-language poet

== See also ==
- Darron, given name
- Darin (name), given name and surname
- Deron, given name
