= Darion =

Darion is a masculine name; variants include Darian and Darien. Notable people with the name include:

== Given name ==
- Darion Atkins (born 1992), American professional basketball player
- Darion Anderson (born 1987), American basketball player
- Darion Clark (born 1994), American football player
- Darion Conner (born 1967), American football player convicted of vehicular homicide
- Darion Copeland (born 1993), American soccer player

== Surname ==
- Joe Darion (1917–2001), American musical theater lyricist
