= Deron =

Deron, also spelled DeRon or DeRonn, is a male given name. Notable people with this name include:

- Deron Bilous (born 1975), Canadian politician
- Deron Cherry (born 1959), American football player
- Deron Feldhaus (born 1968), American basketball player
- DeRon Jenkins (born 1973), American football player
- Deron Johnson (1938–1992), American baseball player
- Deron Johnson (musician), American jazz keyboardist
- Deron Mayo (born 1988), American football player
- Deron McBee (born 1961), American actor and sportsman
- Deron Miller (born 1976), American heavy metal musician
- DeRonn Scott (born 1991), American basketball player
- Deron Quint (born 1976), American ice hockey player
- Deron Washington (born 1985), American basketball player
- Deron Williams (born 1984), American basketball player

== See also ==
- Derron, given name
- Daron, given name and surname
