= Darien II =

Refugee ship

History
- Name: Pole Star (1892-1931); Orphir (1931-1939); Sophia S (1939-1940); Darien II (1940-1951)
- Builder: Fairfields, Glasgow
- Yard number: 367
- Launched: 1892
- In service: 1892
- Out of service: 1950
- Fate: Scrapped, 1951

General characteristics
- Type: Steamer
- Tonnage: 459 GRT; 207 NT
- Length: 175 ft 4 in (53.44 m)
- Beam: 26 ft 4 in (8.03 m)
- Depth: 13 ft 8 in (4.17 m)
- Propulsion: 6-cylinder triple expansion engine, 177 nhp, 2 shafts

Darien II was the last ship to bring Aliya Bet refugees to Haifa during World War II. A former lighthouse tender, she sailed from the Black Sea to Palestine in early 1941.

== Ship history ==
=== Early career ===
The ship was built by the Fairfield Shipbuilding and Engineering Company of Glasgow in 1892 for the Northern Lighthouse Board and served as a tender, named Pole Star, based at Stromness. She was renamed Orphir in 1931, and then sold to William Marshall of Glasgow for conversion to a salvage ship under the same name. In 1933 she was again sold to James M. Stewart of Glasgow. It was used in 1935 to discover the wreck of RMS Lusitania. In 1939 it was sold to P. Svolakis & Co., of Piraeus, Greece, renamed Sophia S, and registered at Colón, Panama.

=== Aliya Bet ===
In May 1940 the ship was purchased in Piraeus by Moshe Agami and Shmarya Zameret for $40,000. Zameret, who was a U.S. citizen, was the registered owner, and renamed the ship Darien II, still registered under the Panamanian flag. Both men were members of Mossad LeAliyah Bet, a branch of Haganah that organised illegal Jewish emigration from Europe to the British Mandate of Palestine. They planned to take the Darien II to Sulina, a port in Romania to rescue 822 Jews from Poland, Germany and Austria, who had attempted to leave Europe in the ship Uranus via the Danube, but had been stranded at Kladovo on the Romanian/Yugoslav border. This plan was abandoned after the entry of Italy into the war in June 1940 made entering the Adriatic too dangerous.

The ship then became involved in a struggle between two branches of Haganah, one dedicated to bringing Jewish refugees from Europe to Palestine in defiance of British restrictions, and the other actively co-operating with the British Special Operations Executive (SOE) to provide Jewish agents to carry out acts of sabotage and intelligence gathering in enemy territory. Various plans were put forward for the ship. Eliyahu Golomb suggested using her to simultaneously infiltrate agents and rescue Jewish refugees in Romania. Another suggestion was to sink the ship at the mouth of the Danube, blocking the entrance. A third plan involved occupying the port of Constanța, Romania, and appears to have received some support from the Royal Navy. Eventually the ship was sold to SOE for £15,000 to operate in the Balkans in cooperation with Haganah, though Zameret remained the registered owner and the ship remained under the control of Mossad LeAliyah Bet.

In August 1940 the Darien II sailed to Alexandria, then to Istanbul, and finally arrived at Constanța in November. There refugees from Romania and Poland boarded, and the ship sailed to Sulina where more refugees were expected. She waited until the end of December, but when they did not arrive, the ship finally left. On the return voyage to Constanța the Darien II hit a reef and had to be towed to a dry-dock for repairs. On 17 February 1941 Darien II left Constanța with 460 refugees on board, arriving at Varna, Bulgaria, the next day. When the Bulgarian authorities arrested the ship's captain, Olaf Bergenson, a former Norwegian naval officer, was appointed to command. On 28 February the ship sailed from Varna with 750 refugees aboard, arriving in Istanbul on 2 March. More refugees were embarked there bringing the total up to 792, which included survivors from the Salvador, another Aliyah Bet ship that sank in the Sea of Marmara on 14 December 1940 with the loss of 204, including 66 children.

On 15 March 1941, the ship sailed from Istanbul. It was not intercepted by the British, and could have landed the refugees on the coast. However the ship sailed directly into Haifa on 19 March, and the refugees were detained in the Atlit detainee camp, and were not all released until 22 May 1942.

Among the refugees aboard Darien II were Abba Berdichev, who joined SOE and was parachuted back into Europe only to be caught and executed by the Germans, and Shulamit, later wife of prime minister Yitzhak Shamir.

=== Later career and disposal ===
The Darien II was requisitioned by the British authorities, and under their control sailed to Tobruk in late 1941 following the lifting of the siege. She was then berthed at Alexandria, resuming convoy duties in early 1943 between ports in North Africa, and later Sicily, then shifting operations to ports in mainland Italy in 1944–1945.

She operated under the control of the Ministry of War Transport, and was managed by the Wilson Line in 1945, and was purchased from her owners by the Ministry of Transport in 1948 to operate in the Eastern Mediterranean. She was eventually laid up at Port Said in 1950, sold to Italian ship-breakers, and arrived at Spezia for breaking up in 1951.

== In media ==
The Darien Dilemma, a film that mixed a fictionalized retelling of the final Aliya Bet sailing with interviews of actual passengers, premièred at the Tel Aviv International Documentary Film Festival in April 2006.

== See also ==
- Ruth Klüger - Aliav
