= Atlit detainee camp =

Concentration camp in Mandatory Palestine

Coordinates: 32°42′45″N 34°56′57″E

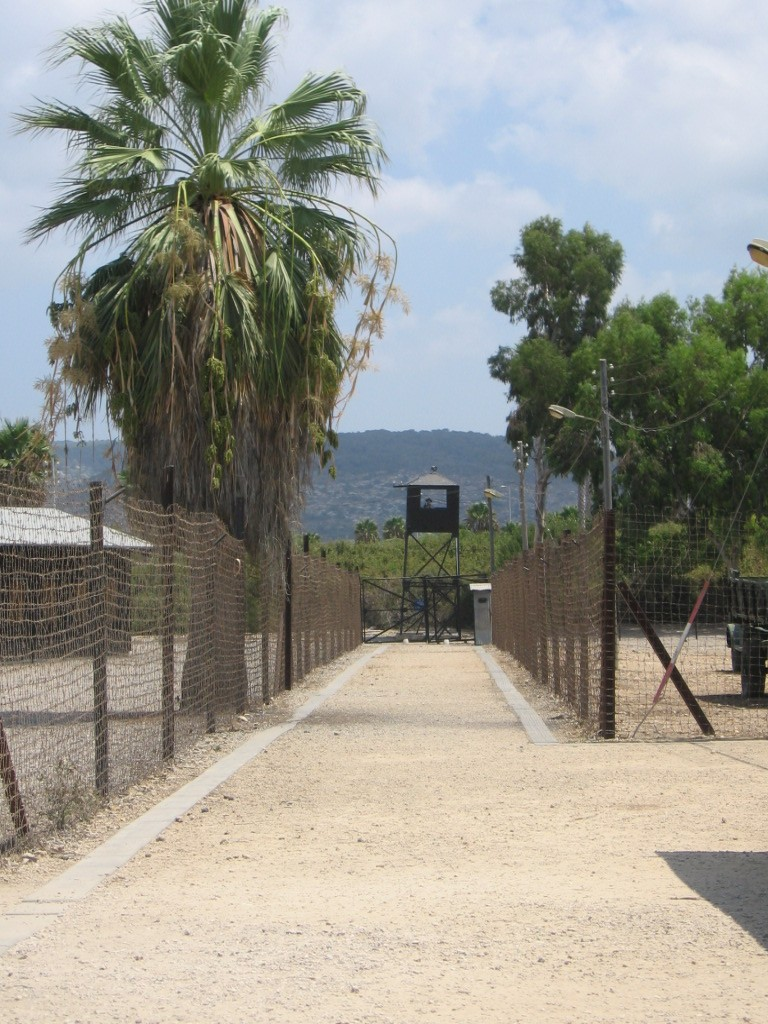
Entrance to the Aliyah Bet museum at the camp, 2007

The Atlit detainee camp was an internment camp established by the authorities of Mandatory Palestine in the late 1930s on what is now the Israeli coastal plain, 20 kilometres (12 mi) south of Haifa. Under British rule, it was primarily used to hold Jews and Arabs who were in administrative detention; it largely held Jewish immigrants who did not possess official entry permits. Tens of thousands of Jewish refugees were interned at the camp, which was surrounded by barbed wire and watchtowers.

The camp at Atlit now has a museum that covers the history of aliyah by non-permitted Jews. It was declared a National Heritage Site by Israel in 1987.

== History ==
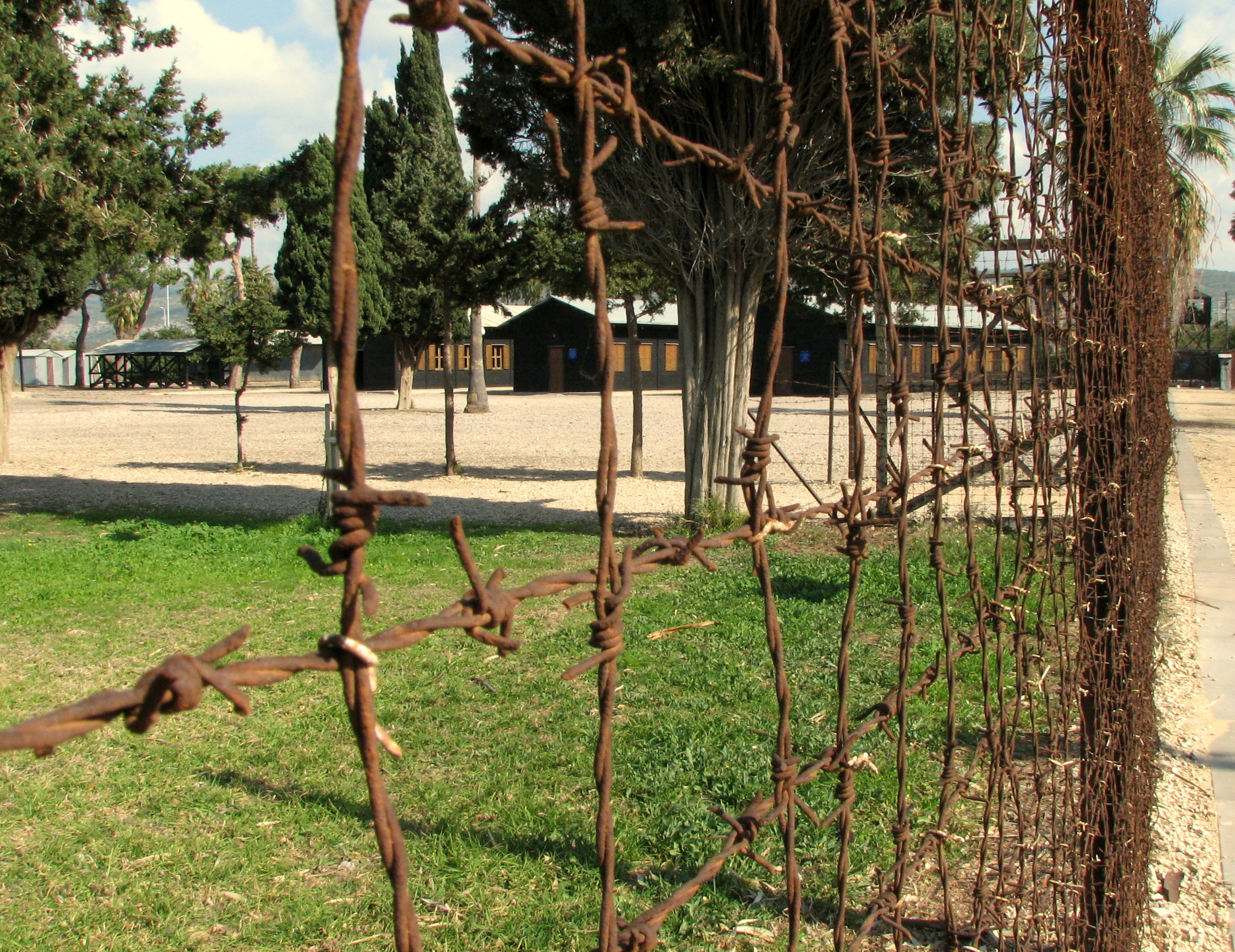
Old barbed-wire fence inside the camp, 2008

The camp at Atlit, established by the British government in the 1930s, was surrounded by barbed wire and watchtowers. Many of the detainees during the 1930s and 1940s were Jewish refugees from German-occupied Europe.

At Atlit camp, the men were sent to one side, women to the other. They were sprayed with DDT, then told to undress and enter the showers. In 1939–1948, tens of thousands of Jewish immigrants were interned here, men and women separated by barbed wire. Some internees stayed as long as 23 months.

=== WWII (camp active 1939-42) ===
Some of the Palestine Germans, including Templers living in their own colonies, who openly supported the Nazis, were declared enemy nationals by the British authorities and were detained at Atlit prior to deportation.

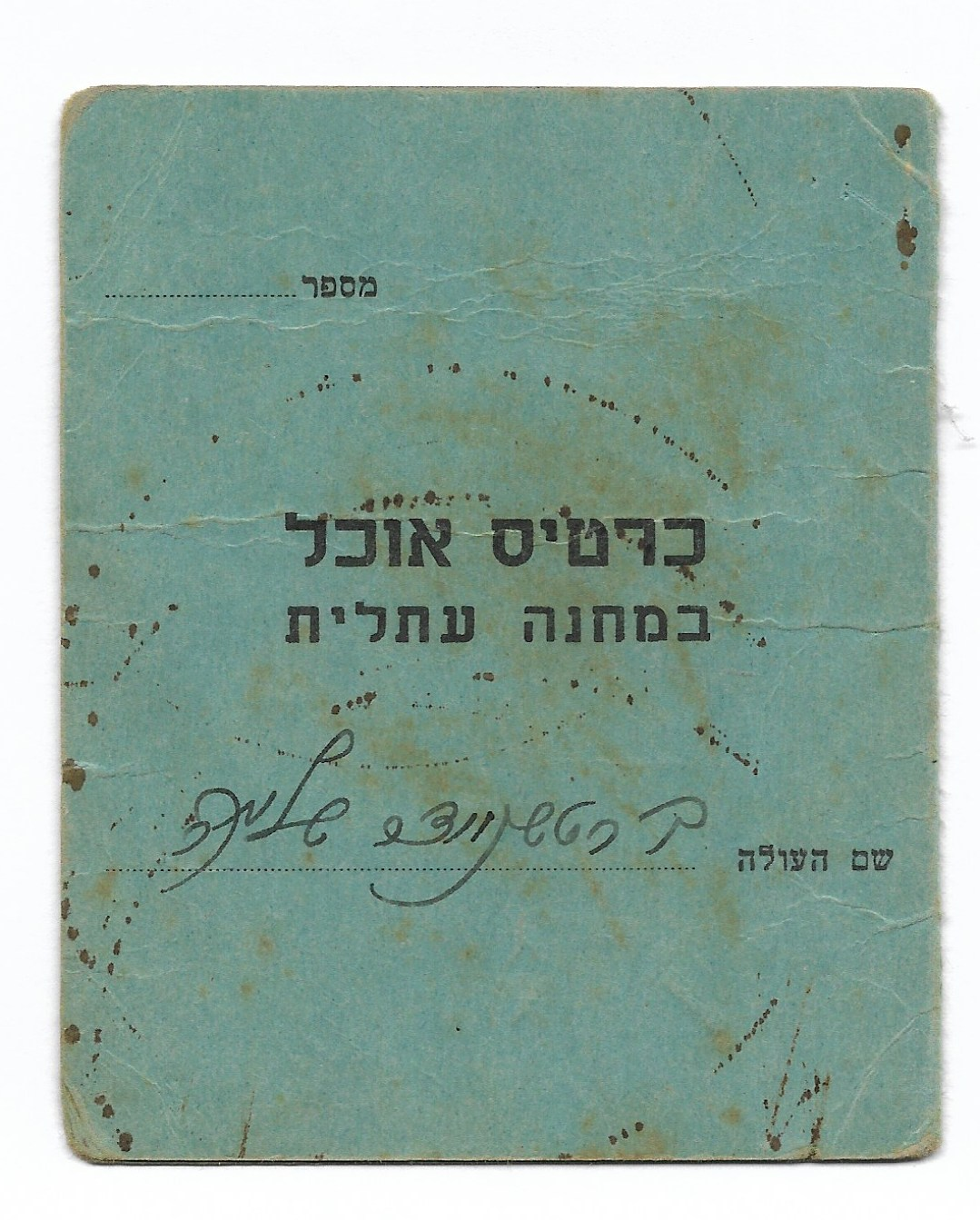
Meal-ration card for the camp's inmates from 1947

In November 1940, the British authorities decided to send 5000 immigrants to detention camps on Mauritius. One of these deporting ships was the Patria. To stop the deportation, the Haganah, the Jewish underground militia in Palestine, exploded a bomb in the ship's hold on November 25. The size of the explosive charge had been seriously miscalculated, and the ship sank quickly. On board were 1800 refugees; 216 drowned in the disaster. The survivors from the Patria were detained in Atlit and not deported to Mauritius. They were released after a few months.

The Darien II arrived with 800 refugees in March 1941. They were detained at the Atlit camp until September 1942, when the camp was shut down.

=== Post-WWII British camp (1945-1948) ===
The Atlit camp was reopened in 1945 following World War II, as more and more immigrants arrived in Palestine. Most of them were Holocaust survivors from DP camps in Europe who made the journey through the Berihah and Ha'apala ("Aliya Beth") clandestine immigration network.

On October 10, 1945, the Palmach (special forces unit of the Haganah) broke into the camp and released 208 detainees, who escaped. Yitzhak Rabin, then a young officer, planned the raid and Nachum Sarig commanded it. Following this event, the British deported immigrants to Cyprus internment camps. These camps operated from 1946 through the establishment of the State of Israel.

=== Israel's wars (1948-49, 1967-70) ===
During the 1948 Arab–Israeli War, Atlit detainee camp served as a prisoner of war (POW) camp and civil internment camp for local Arabs.

POWs from the 1967 war including soldiers from Egypt, Syria, and Jordan, as well as Lebanese citizens were also held at Atlith camp.

== Museum ==
One of the barracks has been restored, with clothes, books, dolls and everyday items donated by former inmates. Also displayed are boards on which prisoners scratched their names and countries of origin in the hopes of finding friends and family members from whom they had become separated during the Holocaust.

== Gallery ==
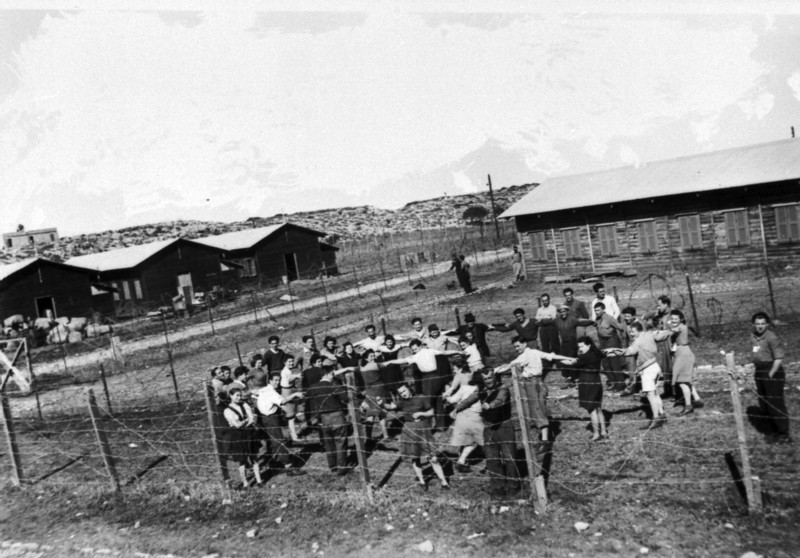
Jewish immigrants interned at Atlit

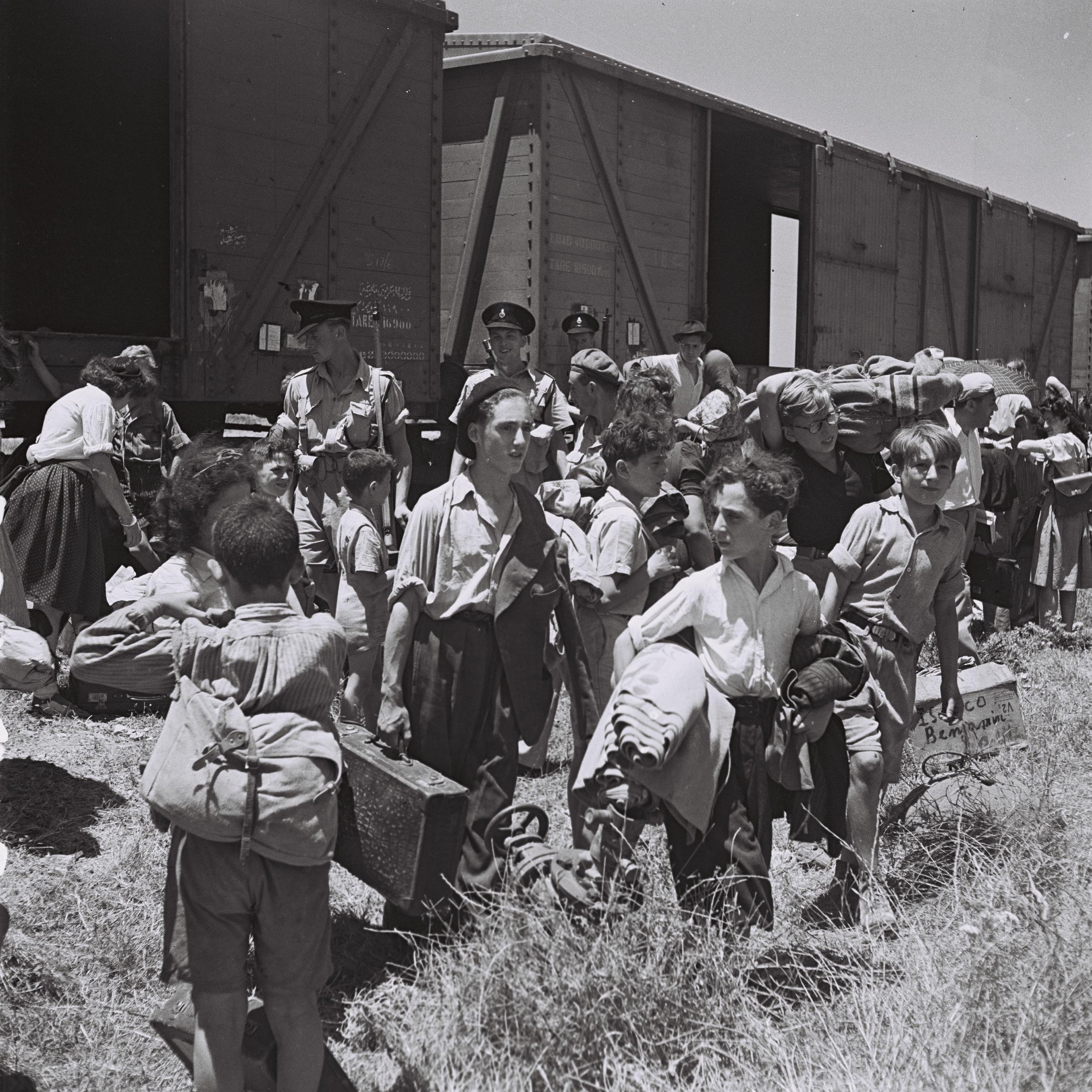
Young Holocaust survivors arriving at Atlit, 1945

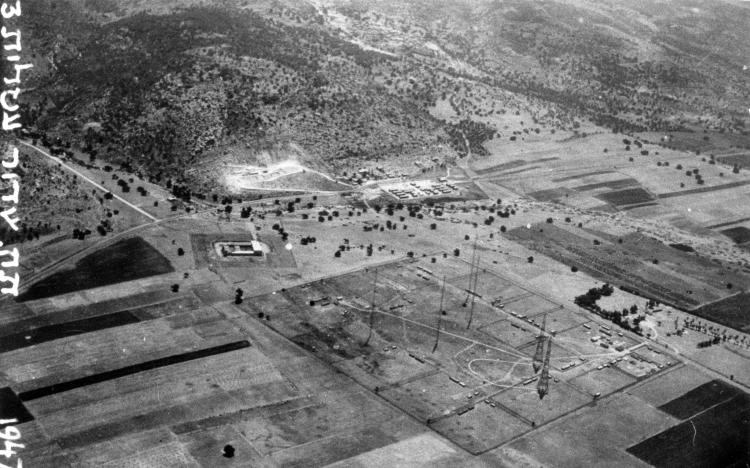
Atlit. Immigrant detention camp beyond broadcasting station, 1947

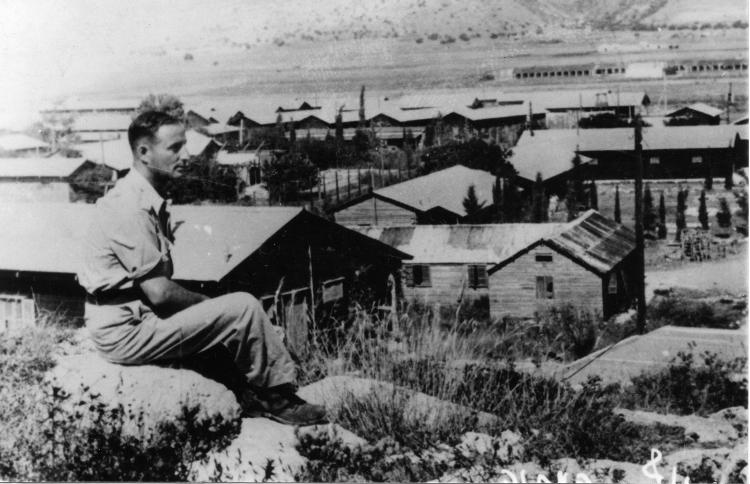
Atlit Camp, 1946

== See also ==
- Israeli POW and labor camps in the 1948 Arab–Israeli War
