= Daren (given name) =

Daren is a masculine given name which may refer to:

- DJ Ashba (born 1972), American musician, guitarist, songwriter, record producer and graphic designer
- Daren Bates (born 1990), American former National Football League player
- Daren Brown (born 1967), American baseball manager, and former player, player-coach, player-manager and coach
- Daren Dykes (born 1981), English retired footballer
- Daren Foster (born 1966), English former cricketer
- Daren Ganga (born 1979), Trinidadian former cricketer
- Daren Gilbert (1963–2022), American National Football League player
- Huang Daren (born 1945), Chinese mathematician and former president of Sun Yat-sen University
- Daren Kagasoff (born 1987), American actor
- Daren Kamali (born 1975), Fijian-born New Zealand poet, writer, musician, teacher and museum curator
- Daren King (born 1972), English novelist and children's writer
- Daren Lee (born 1965), English golfer
- Liew Daren (born 1987), Malaysian former badminton player
- Daren Metropoulos (born 1983), American businessman and real estate investor
- Daren Millard (born 1970), Canadian sportscaster
- Daren Mosengo (born 2006), French footballer
- Daren O'Leary (born 1973), English former rugby union player
- Ou Daren (1516–1596), Chinese Ming Dynasty poet and civil servant
- Daren Powell (born 1978), West Indian former international cricketer
- Daren Puppa (born 1965), Canadian former National Hockey League goaltender
- Daren Queenan (born 1966), American retired basketball player
- Daren Rolland (born 1998), French Muay Thai fighter
- Daren Sammy (born 1983), Saint Lucian cricketer
- Daren Stone (born 1985), American former football player
- Daren Sweeney (born 1970), West Indian former cricketer
- Daren Tan (born 1983), Singaporean singer
- Daren Tang (born 1972), Singaporean civil servant
- Daren Wilkinson (born 1972), American college football coach and former player
- Daren Zenner (1971–2020), Canadian boxer

== See also ==
- Fu Da-ren (1933–2018), Taiwanese basketball player and television presenter
- Darren
- Darin (disambiguation)
