= Darren Hall =

Darren Hall may refer to:

- Darren Hall (baseball) (born 1964), Major League Baseball pitcher
- Darren Hall (badminton) (born 1965), retired badminton player from Great Britain
- Darren Hall (American football) (born 2000), National Football League player
- Darren Hall (politician) (born 1969), Green Party politician
