= Deh-e Daran, Kerman =

Deh-e Daran ده دران
- Village
- Location within Iran
- Coordinates: 26°43′00″N 58°51′00″E
- Country: Iran
- Province: Kerman
- County: Qaleh Ganj
- Bakhsh: Chah Dadkhoda
- Rural District: Rameshk

Population (2006)
  - Total: 71
- Time zone: UTC+3:30 (IRST)
  - Summer (DST): UTC+4:30 (IRDT)

Deh-e Daran (Persian: ده دران, also Romanized as Deh-e Darān and Deh Darān) is a village in Rameshk Rural District, Chah Dadkhoda District, Qaleh Ganj County, Kerman Province, Iran. At the 2006 census, its population was 71, in 21 families.
