= Darian Lane =

American film writer, director, and producer

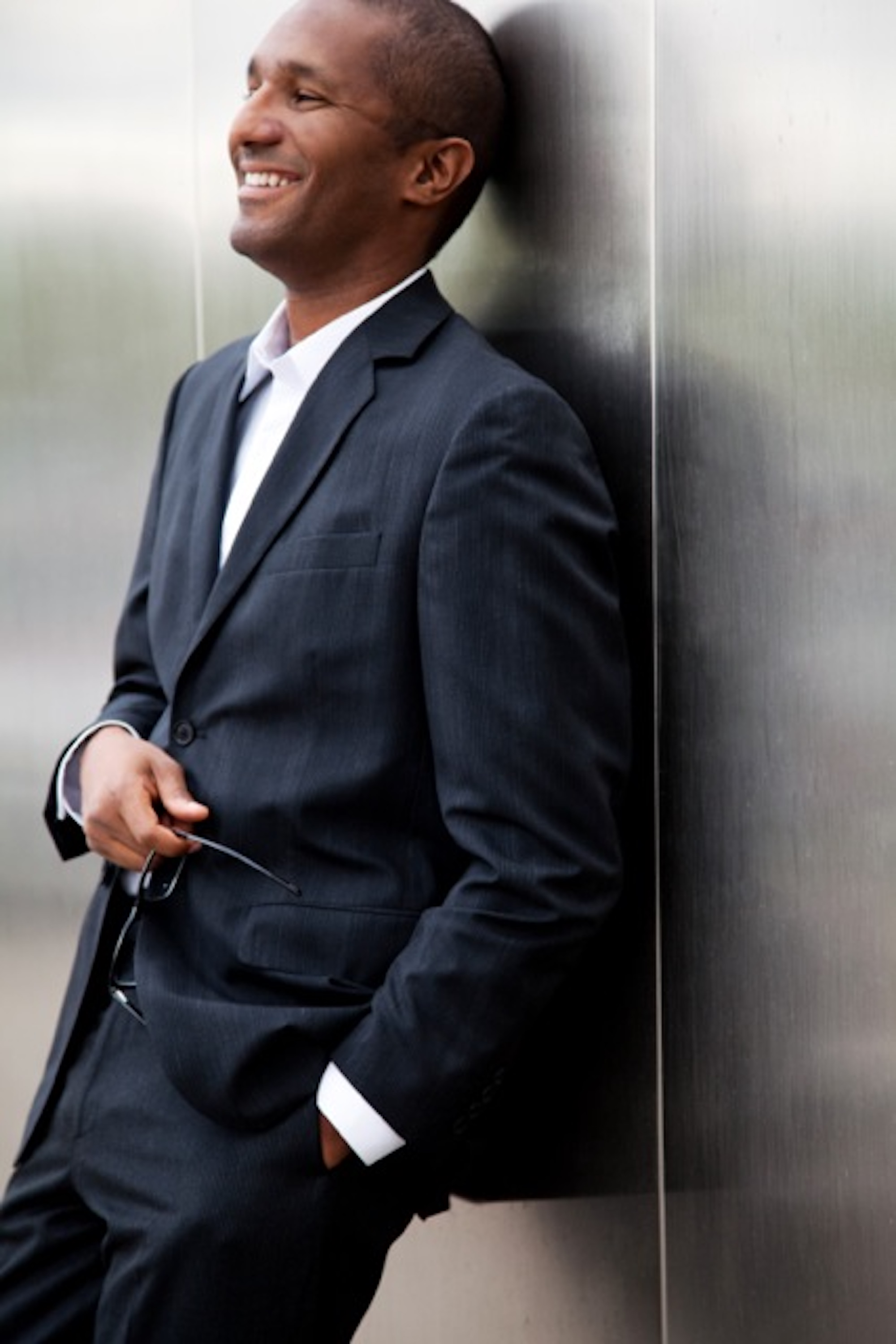
Darian Lane

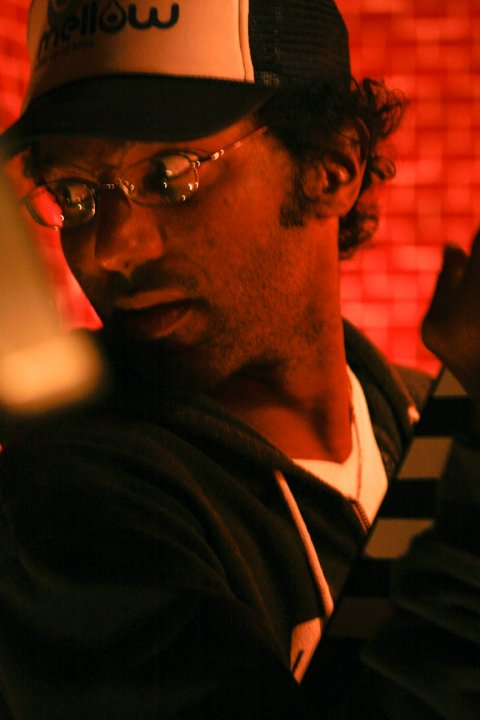
Darian Lane

Darian Lane is an American film writer, director, and producer, best known as an assistant director and producer of music videos and commercials. He has worked with Muhammad Ali, Beyoncé, 50 Cent, Snoop Dogg, Black Eyed Peas, Mary J. Blige, Pharrell, Gwen Stefani, Chris Brown, Audioslave, Nike, Reebok, PetSmart, Pepsi, and IBM.

Born in Philadelphia, Pennsylvania, and raised in Bethesda, Maryland, Darian Lane graduated from Arizona State University with a degree in communications and moved to Los Angeles.

In Los Angeles, Lane worked in an editing facility before working as a production assistant on music videos and commercials, and then as assistant director and producer. He began screenwriting and his first film, The Hitchhiking Game, based on a Milan Kundera short story went to Cannes. His film The Collector, went to the NY/LA International and Malibu Film Festivals.

Darian Lane is the creator of the television series "CABARET", the beach volleyball reality show "AVP", and the uncredited creator of the TV series Flesh & Bone on Starz.

He also wrote and directed a number of plays including: The Broadway Play, Beautiful Corpses, Contempt, Grisley Fables, The Painting, Backstage, and Birth of a Murderer.

Lane has also written articles for The New York Times, The Malibu Times, Los Angeles Times and Ebony as well as published 7 novels, "The Girlfriend Experience", "The Great American Novel", "unabridged", "GASLIGHT", "The Sci-Fi Fantasy", "The Novel (a memoir)", "BLACK LinkedIn" "Flashy Fiction (series)", "Hashtag" and True Hollywood Stories.
