= Darren Farris =

American singer-songwriter

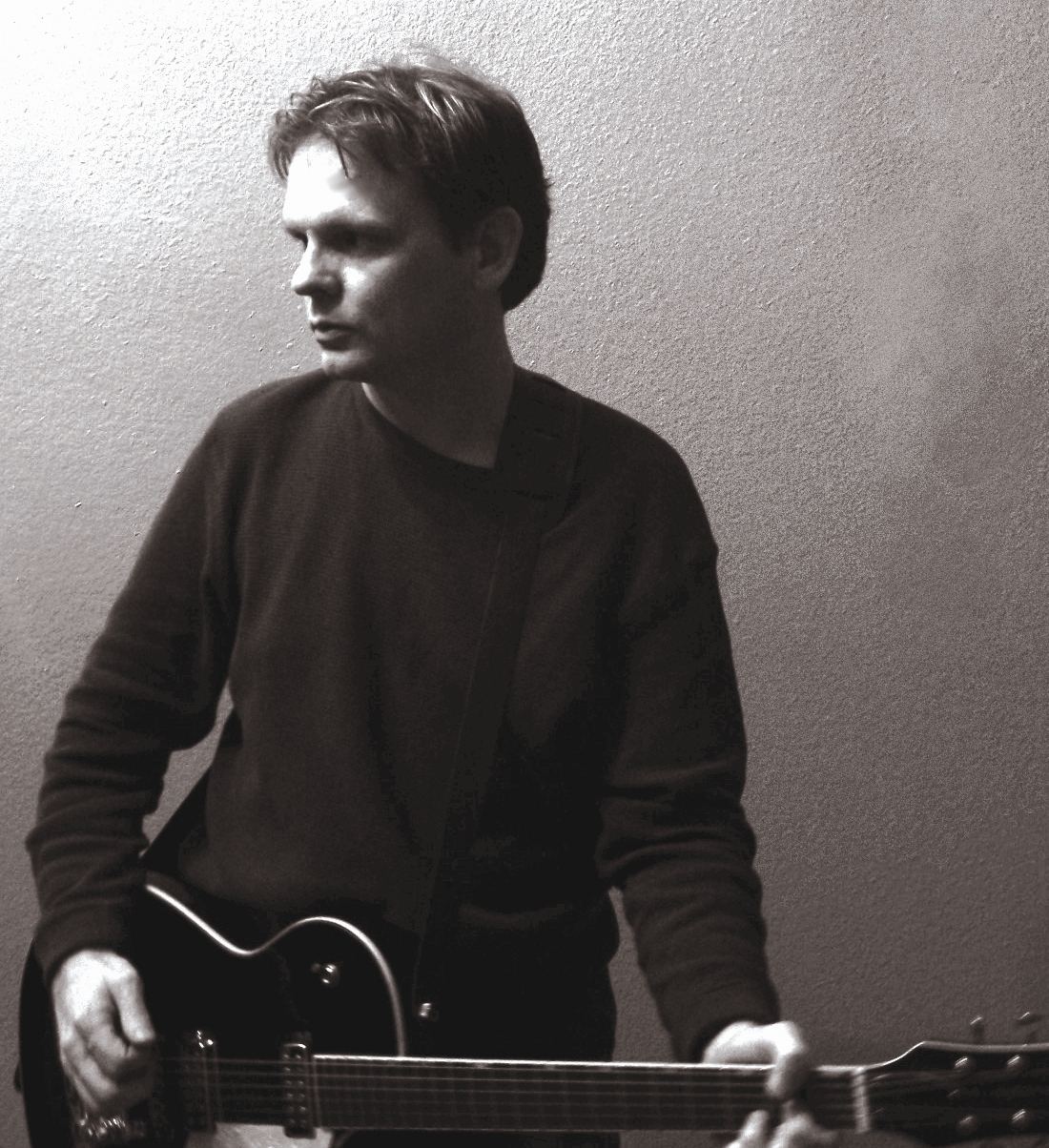
- Singer-songwriter Darren Farris.

Background information
- Born: Darren Farris; August 2, 1972 (age 53)
- Origin: Los Angeles, California, U.S.
- Genres: Power pop, pop rock, rock, AOR
- Occupations: Singer-songwriter, record producer
- Instruments: Guitar, keyboards
- Years active: 2007–present
- Label: GRM Records
- Website: darrenfarris.com

Darren Farris (born August 2, 1972) is an American singer-songwriter based out of Los Angeles, California. As a musician he is most notable for the self-penned 2008 singles "Jenna" and "Save Me", from the album Psychopathic Issues. Just weeks after the 2008 release of Psychopathic Issues, Farris' father died. The death of his father sent Farris into social reclusion for several months, distancing himself from the music industry and his new-found fans. In the spring of 2009 Farris emerged from his hiatus and resumed promotion efforts for Psychopathic Issues with a deep space, broadcast transmission of his single "Save Me". The deep space transmission garnered Farris some press headlines and put him second only to The Beatles for similar deep space broadcasts. However, despite several efforts Farris was unable to spawn another significant hit song from the album.

== Early years ==
After being raised the first five years of his life in Chicago, Illinois, the Farris' family relocated to Tennessee. Darren was so influenced by the music being pumped out of the Memphis airwaves, that he would ditch school to hang out at Beale Street dives. Later he would relocate to Los Angeles and study acting under the Hollywood-based acting coach Ellen Gerstein.
