= Darin (name) =

Darin is both a given name and a surname. Notable people with the name include:

== Given name ==
- Darin Ahmad (born 1979), Syrian artist, poet and writer
- Darin De Paul (born 1963), American voice actor
- Darin Erstad (born 1974), American baseball player and coach
- Darin LaHood (born 1968), American attorney and politician
- Darin Morgan (born 1966), American screenwriter and actor
- Darin Ruf (born 1986), American major league baseball player
- Darin Strauss (born 1970), American author
- Darin Zanyar (born 1987), known as Darin (singer), Swedish pop singer of Kurdish origin

== Surname ==
- Bobby Darin (1936–1973), American pop singer
- Chino Darín (born 1989), Argentine actor
- Mark Darin, American video game designer and writer
- Ricardo Darín (born 1957), Argentine actor
- Roxana Darín (1931–2018), Argentine actress

== See also ==
- Daron, a given name and surname
- Darren, a given name
- Derren, a given name
- Derrin, a given name
