= Duran Darreh =

Duran Darreh دوراندره
- Village
- Location within Iran
- Coordinates: 33°46′31″N 48°41′17″E
- Country: Iran
- Province: Lorestan
- County: Borujerd
- Bakhsh: Central
- Rural District: Hemmatabad

Population (2006)
  - Total: 24
- Time zone: UTC+3:30 (IRST)
  - Summer (DST): UTC+4:30 (IRDT)

Duran Darreh (Persian: دوراندره, also Romanized as Dūrān Darreh, Darrān Darreh, Darān Darreh, Darun Darreh, and Dowrān Darreh) is a village in Hemmatabad Rural District, in the Central District of Borujerd County, Lorestan Province, Iran. At the 2006 census, its population was 24, in 5 families.
