= Taron =

Taron may refer to:

== People ==
- Taron Egerton (born 1989), British actor
- Taron Johnson (born 1996), American football player
- Taron Margaryan (born 1978), Armenian politician and mayor of Yerevan
- Taron Vincent (born 2000), American football player
- Taron Voskanyan (born 1993), Armenian football player
- Taron people, an ethnic group in Burma

== Places ==
- Taron (historic Armenia), a historic province
- Mount Taron, New Ireland, Papua New Guinea

== Other uses ==
- Taron Malicos, a character in the video game Star Wars Jedi: Fallen Order
- Taron (gastropod), a genus of gastropods in the family Fasciolariidae
- Taron (roller coaster), at Phantasialand, Germany

== See also ==
- Grigor I of Taron (died 923/36), ruler of the southern Armenian region of Taron
- Khachatur of Taron (died 1184), Armenian poet, musician and religious figure
