= Daran, Azerbaijan =

Daran
- Location within Azerbaijan
- Coordinates: 39°36′21″N 48°08′17″E
- Country: Azerbaijan
- Rayon: Bilasuvar
- Time zone: UTC+4 (AZT)

Daran is a village in the Bilasuvar Rayon of Azerbaijan.
