= Ruth Klüger-Aliav =

Ukrainian-born Romanian and Israeli Jewish Zionist activist

Ruth Klüger Aliav (née Polishuk) (Hebrew: רות קלוגר-אליאב; April 27, 1910 – February 16, 1980) was a Ukrainian-born Romanian and Israeli Jewish Zionist activist, assisting in the Aliyah Bet before and after World War II.

== Childhood and studies ==
Born in Kiev, Ukraine (then in the Russian Empire until 1918, lived in her youth in Cernăuţi (Czernowitz), Bucovina, then part of the Kingdom of Romania, and nowadays in Ukraine), she was a graduate from the University of Vienna who could speak nine languages.

== Early activities ==
Ruth Klüger went to Palestine after her marriage in 1930 to Emanuel Klüger, and later joined Aliya Bet, being sent on missions to Romania and other European countries. She was one of ten original members of the Mossad LeAliyah Bet, a Zionist group dedicated to helping Jews escape the Holocaust in Europe. Fluent in nine languages, she raised funds and helped organize the ships the Tiger Hill (September 1939) and the Hilda (January 1940) to carry Jewish refugees to Palestine. After Romania became an Axis Power, she escaped to Istanbul, Turkey and there together with other Mossad agents organized the dispatch of the ship the Darien II in March 1941. A full account of these deeds is in her autobiography The Last Escape, which was a best seller in 1974, and filmed as The Darien Dilemma (2005).

She was a Mossad agent in Cairo from 1941 to 1944. In 1944, with Charles de Gaulle's help, she arrived in a liberated Paris and was the first Mossad agent to contact survivors of the Holocaust.

== 1945 ==
In October 1945, Klüger acquired a troopship, the Ascanious, from an American, Colonel Ernest Witte, of Dwight D. Eisenhower's staff. It was planned that the vessel would convey orphans to Palestine and it was soon crammed with 2,600 Holocaust survivors. On arrival in Haifa, the British government of Palestine had no choice but to let them in. The colonel wanted to repeat the passage, but it was vetoed by Eisenhower because of British pressure.

In October 1945, David Ben-Gurion arrived in Paris and, to avoid eavesdroppers, he and Klüger-Aliav went for a four-hour walk in the Bois de Boulogne. Ben-Gurion wanted to know if the Holocaust survivors would be ready to sail in the cramped Aliya Beth "nutshell" ships. Klüger-Aliav convinced him that after the Holocaust, the refugees would endure any hardship in order to reach the new homeland.

== Later career ==
Paris then became the headquarters of Aliya Beth; soon afterwards Klüger-Aliav left for South America and the United States, raising money and buying ships. After Israeli independence in 1948, she was public relations manager at ZIM, the Israeli shipping company.

Ruth and Emanuel Klüger divorced in 1940. Ben-Gurion suggested to Ruth a new Hebrew surname: Aliav, an acronym for Aliyah Bet (V and B are the same Hebrew letter).
