= Darrin (name) =

Darrin is both a masculine given name and a surname. Notable people with the name include:

== Given name ==
=== B ===
- Darrin Bell (born 1975), American editorial cartoonist
- Darrin Kenneth O'Brien (born 1969), stage name Snow (musician), Canadian musician
- Darrin Brown (born 1970), Canadian actor

=== C ===
- Darrin Camilleri (born 1992), American politician
- Darrin Canniff (born c. 1966), Canadian politician
- Darrin Chapin (born 1966), American baseball player
- Darrin Chappell, American politician
- Darrin Chiaverini (born 1977), American football player and coach

=== D ===
- Darrin DeLatte, former member of the American hard rock group Lillian Axe

=== F ===
- Darrin Fitzgerald, American basketball player
- Darrin Fletcher (born 1966), American baseball player

=== G ===
- Darrin P. Gayles (born 1966), American judge
- Darrin Govens (born 1988), American-Hungarian basketball player

=== H ===
- Darrin Hancock (born 1971), American basketball player
- Darrin Henson (born 1973), American choreographer and actor
- Darrin Hodgetts, New Zealand psychology academic
- Darrin Horn (born 1972), American college basketball head coach
- Darrin Huss (born 1965), Canadian musical artist

=== J ===
- Darrin Jackson (born 1963), African-American baseball player

=== M ===
- Darrin MacLeod (born 1994), Canadian soccer player
- Darrin Maharaj, Canadian television host and reporter
- Darrin McMahon (born 1965), American historian
- Darrin Miller (born 1965), American football player
- Darrin Mooney (born 1967), English musical artist
- Darrin Morris (1966–2000), American boxer
- Darrin Murray (born 1967), New Zealand cricketer

=== N ===
- Darrin Nelson (born 1959), American football player

=== P ===
- Darrin Patrick (1970–2020), American author and pastor
- Darrin Pfeiffer (born 1969), American musician
- Darrin Plab (born 1970), American athlete
- Darrin Pritchard (born 1966), Australian rules footballer

=== R ===
- Darrin Ramshaw (born 1965), Australian cricketer
- Darrin Reaves (born 1993), American football player
- Darrin Rose, Canadian actor

=== S ===
- Darrin Shannon (born 1969), Canadian ice hockey player
- Darrin Smith (born 1970), American football player
- Darrin Steele (born 1969), American bobsledder

=== V ===
- Darrin Van Horn (born 1968), American boxer
- Darrin Verhagen (born 1967), Australian musical artist

=== W ===
- Darrin Walls (born 1988), American football player
- Darrin Wiener, known as Plastiq Phantom, American musical artist
- Darrin Williams, American lawyer and politician
- Darrin Winston (1966–2008), American baseball player

=== Z ===
- Darrin Zammit Lupi (born 1968), Maltese photographer and journalist

== Surname ==
- Diana Darrin (born 1933), American actress and singer
- Howard "Dutch" Darrin (1897–1982), American automotive stylist
- Sonia Darrin (1924–2020), American actress

== Fictional characters ==
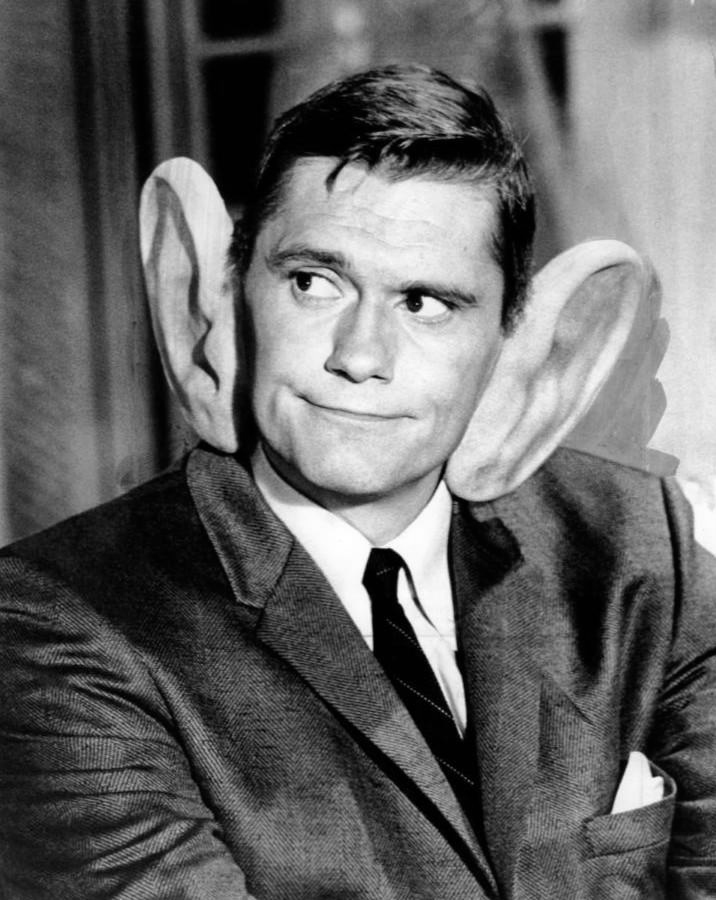
Dick York as Darrin Stephens in Bewitched

- Darrin "Doughboy" Baker, one of the main characters in the film Boyz n the Hood
- Darrin Stephens, one of the main characters in the television series Bewitched
- Darrin Tyler, one of the main characters in Wonderfalls

== See also ==
- Darren
