= Deh-e Daran, Khuzestan =

Deh-e Daran دهداران
- Village
- Location within Iran
- Coordinates: 32°05′22″N 49°50′53″E
- Country: Iran
- Province: Khuzestan
- County: Izeh
- Bakhsh: Susan
- Rural District: Susan-e Gharbi

Population (2006)
  - Total: 26
- Time zone: UTC+3:30 (IRST)
  - Summer (DST): UTC+4:30 (IRDT)

Deh-e Daran (Persian: دهداران, also Romanized as Deh-e Dārān and Dehdārān) is a village in Susan-e Gharbi Rural District, Susan District, Izeh County, Khuzestan Province, Iran. At the 2006 census, its population was 26, in 5 families.
