= Darron =

Darron is a given name. Notable people with the name include:

- Darron Brittman (born 1962), American basketball player
- Darron Cox (born 1967), former Major League Baseball player
- Darron Foy (born 1971), English former cricketer
- Darron Gee, English former footballer and assistant manager of York City
- Darron Gibson (born 1987), Irish footballer
- Darron Lee (born 1994), American football player
- Darron McDonough (born 1962), English former footballer
- Darron Nell (born 1980), South African rugby union player
- Darron Pickstock, Bahamian lawyer and politician
- Darron Reekers (born 1973), New Zealander-born Dutch cricketer
- Darron Stiles (born 1973), American golfer
- Darron Thomas (born 1990), college football quarterback
- Another name for Darrhon, an ancient Macedonian minor god of healing

== See also ==
- Daron
- Darren
- Derren
