= Darien =

Darien may refer to:

== Places ==
=== Central America ===
- Darién Gap, break in the Pan-American Highway between Colombia and Panama
- Darién National Park
- Darién Province
- Gulf of Darién
- "... a peak in Darien", phrase in Keats's poem "On First Looking into Chapman's Homer"

=== United States ===
- Darien, Connecticut
  - Darien (Metro-North station)
- Darien, Georgia
- Darien, Illinois
- Darien, Missouri
- Darien, New York
- Darien, Wisconsin
- Darien (town), Wisconsin

== People ==
=== First name ===
- Darien Angadi (1949–1984), British actor
- Darien Boswell (1938–2018), New Zealand rower
- Darien Brockington (born 1979), American singer
- Darien Butler (born 2000), American football player
- Darien Fenton (born 1954), New Zealand politician
- Darien Ferrer (born 1983), Cuban volleyball player
- Darien Graham-Smith (born 1975), British journalist
- Darien Porter (born 2001), American football player
- Darien Sills-Evans (born 1974), American actor
- Darien Takle, New Zealand actor

=== Surname ===
- Georges Darien (1862–1921), French writer

== Ships ==
- SS Darien (1924), a turbo-electric refrigerated cargo ship
- Darien II, World War II refugee ship

== Fictional characters ==
- Camila Darién, in Mexican telenovela Pasión
- Darien Fawkes, in The Invisible Man television series, 2000–2002
- Darien Lambert, a character in the 1990s television series Time Trax
- Darien Maugrim, a character in The Fionavar Tapestry novels by Guy Gavriel Kay
- Darien Shields (a.k.a. Tuxedo Mask), a protagonist in the anime Sailor Moon

== Other uses ==
- Darién, brand of bananas distributed in the U.S. by Turbana (company)
- Darien pocket gopher, rodent native to Panama
- Darien scheme, 17th century attempt to create a Scottish colony called "Caledonia"
- Darien Spirit, a progressive rock band signed to Charisma Records
- An alternative name for the extinct Cueva language spoken by the Cueva people

== See also ==
- Darian (disambiguation)
- Darion (disambiguation)
- Dairen, the Japanese name for Dalian, China
