= Daron Joffe =

American businessman

Daron Joffe (born 1976) is a U.S. agribusiness and nonprofit executive who is prominent in the organic farming and biodynamic agriculture movements. He is the founder and president of Farmer D and author of award-winning book, Citizen Farmers - The Biodynamic Way to Grow Healthy Food, Build Thriving Communities and Give Back to the Earth.

== Education and early career ==
Joffe was born in South Africa and moved with his family to Atlanta, Georgia, when he was three years old. When he was a student at the University of Wisconsin–Madison, he took an accredited apprenticeship on a nearby organic farm. Joffe dropped out of school in 1995 and returned to Georgia, where took an apprenticeship at a biodynamic farm. In 1996, he returned to Wisconsin and bought a farm, where he combined organic and biodynamic agricultural practices. In 1998, he was honored by the American Biodynamic Association as the organization's “rookie biodynamic farmer of the year.” Joffe would later recall that the farm was not profitable, and that he made more money selling organic pizza and falafel at a farmers’ market in Madison, Wisconsin.

In 2000, Joffe relocated to San Francisco, California, where he worked as a teacher with the San Francisco League of Urban Gardeners (SLUG). The program, which was based at the Log Cabin Ranch in the Santa Cruz Mountains and was run by the San Francisco Juvenile Probation Department, taught horticulture and farming to incarcerated teenagers.

Joffe, in an interview with the San Francisco Chronicle, praised the SLUG concept of bringing urban youth to a farm setting. "Gardening is a powerful teaching tool because food is so elemental and they get that," he said. "Out here, these kids grow food that they contribute to their communities back home. That's a life-changing experience for many of them."

== Nonprofit and corporate farming endeavors ==
Joffe returned to Georgia in 2002. In January 2003, he received a $60,000 grant from the philanthropic Joshua Venture to establish Gan Chaim (Hebrew for "Garden of Life"), which sought to bring involve the state's Jewish community in organic and biodynamic solutions to a farm in Athens, Georgia. Joffe compared the concept of Gan Chaim to an Israeli kibbutz, with its sense of community support and self-reliance.

Later in 2003, Joffe created Farmer D Organics, an agribusiness consulting company. The company expanded into producing a line of organic compost that is sold in U.S. natural products retail stores.

Joffe expanded his public profile through his work as vice-president of Georgia Organics, a nonprofit organization that promotes the state's organically grown foods, and through weekly video features presented on the Mother Nature Network environmental Web site. He has also developed organic farms for the University of Georgia and for low-income communities within the state. In 2005, he began operations for a 13-acre (53,000 m^{2}) organic farm at Hampton Island, a private community in Riceboro, Georgia.
