= Darin, Sistan and Baluchestan =

Darin درين
- Village
- Location within Iran
- Coordinates: 27°37′43″N 60°53′17″E
- Country: Iran
- Province: Sistan and Baluchestan
- County: Khash
- Bakhsh: Irandegan
- Rural District: Irandegan

Population (2006)
  - Total: 33
- Time zone: UTC+3:30 (IRST)
  - Summer (DST): UTC+4:30 (IRDT)

Darin (Persian: درين, also Romanized as Darīn) is a village in Irandegan Rural District, Irandegan District, Khash County, Sistan and Baluchestan Province, Iran. At the 2006 census, its population was 33, in 7 families.
