= Seh Daran, Bam =

Seh Daran سه دران
- Village
- Location within Iran
- Coordinates: 29°06′25″N 57°53′33″E
- Country: Iran
- Province: Kerman
- County: Bam
- Bakhsh: Central
- Rural District: Deh Bakri

Population (2006)
  - Total: 31
- Time zone: UTC+3:30 (IRST)
  - Summer (DST): UTC+4:30 (IRDT)

Seh Daran (Persian: سه دران, also Romanized as Seh Darān; also known as Seh Darūn) is a village in Deh Bakri Rural District, in the Central District of Bam County, Kerman Province, Iran. At the 2006 census, its population was 31, in 8 families.
