= Seh Deran, Jiroft =

Seh Deran سه دران
- Village
- Location within Iran
- Coordinates: 29°18′13″N 57°22′47″E
- Country: Iran
- Province: Kerman
- County: Jiroft
- Bakhsh: Sarduiyeh
- Rural District: Sarduiyeh

Population (2006)
  - Total: 425
- Time zone: UTC+3:30 (IRST)
  - Summer (DST): UTC+4:30 (IRDT)

Seh Deran (Persian: سه دران, also Romanized as Seh Derān and Seh Darān; also known as Sedran) is a village in Sarduiyeh Rural District, Sarduiyeh District, Jiroft County, Kerman Province, Iran. At the 2006 census, its population was 425, in 63 families.
