= Dıryan =

- Municipality
- Location within Azerbaijan
- Coordinates: 38°51′00″N 48°37′05″E
- Country: Azerbaijan
- Rayon: Lankaran

Population
  - Total: 878 (2,019)
- Time zone: UTC+4 (AZT)
  - Summer (DST): UTC+5 (AZT)

Dıryan (also, Diryan, Darian, and Dyr’yan) is a village and municipality in the Lankaran Rayon of Azerbaijan. Diryan village is a part of Gagiran municipality. Diryan is of talysh origin and the meaning of the word differs in different sources. Some say its meaning is "two roads", others say the meaning is "between two mountains" and so on. It has a population of 878. The area of the village is 515 ha. Diryan Village Mosque religious community functions in the village.
