= Derren =

- Gender: Male

Origin
- Origin: Unknown

Other names
- Related names: Darren

Derren is a masculine given name. It is a variant of Darren. It may refer to:

- Derren Brown, English psychological illusionist
- Derren Litten, British comedy writer and actor
- Derren Nesbitt, English actor popular in the 1950s
- Derren Witcombe, New Zealand Rugby Union footballer

== See also ==
- Darron
- Darren
