= Bab Bini =

Bab Bini باب بيني
- Village
- Location within Iran
- Coordinates: 29°31′55″N 57°23′12″E
- Country: Iran
- Province: Kerman
- County: Kerman
- Bakhsh: Rayen
- Rural District: Rayen

Population (2006)
  - Total: 201
- Time zone: UTC+3:30 (IRST)
  - Summer (DST): UTC+4:30 (IRDT)

Bab Bini (Persian: باب بيني, also Romanized as Bāb Bīnī and Bāb-e Bīnī; also known as Bābīnī, Dārbīnī, and Dermīnī Bābīnī) is a village in Rayen Rural District, Rayen District, Kerman County, Kerman Province, Iran. At the 2006 census, its population was 201, in 56 families.
