= Deh Shahverdi-ye Sofla =

Deh Shahverdi-ye Sofla ده شاهوردي سفلي
- Village
- Location within Iran
- Coordinates: 29°21′35″N 57°29′53″E
- Country: Iran
- Province: Kerman
- County: Kerman
- Bakhsh: Rayen
- Rural District: Hoseynabad-e Goruh

Population (2006)
  - Total: 23
- Time zone: UTC+3:30 (IRST)
  - Summer (DST): UTC+4:30 (IRDT)

Deh Shahverdi-ye Sofla (Persian: ده شاهوردي سفلي, also Romanized as Deh Shāhverdī-ye Soflá) is a village in Hoseynabad-e Goruh Rural District, Rayen District, Kerman County, Kerman Province, Iran. At the 2006 census, its population was 23, in 10 families.
