= Qasr-e Falanj =

Qasr-e Falanj قصرفلنج
- Village
- Location within Iran
- Coordinates: 29°26′46″N 57°39′18″E
- Country: Iran
- Province: Kerman
- County: Kerman
- Bakhsh: Rayen
- Rural District: Rayen

Population (2006)
  - Total: 106
- Time zone: UTC+3:30 (IRST)
  - Summer (DST): UTC+4:30 (IRDT)

Qasr-e Falanj (Persian: قصرفلنج, also Romanized as Qaşr-e Falanj; also known as Kūshk-e Palang) is a village in Rayen Rural District, Rayen District, Kerman County, Kerman Province, Iran. At the 2006 census, its population was 106, in 29 families.
