= Dozduiyeh =

Dozduiyeh دوزدوئيه
- Village
- Location within Iran
- Coordinates: 29°25′00″N 57°25′00″E
- Country: Iran
- Province: Kerman
- County: Kerman
- Bakhsh: Rayen
- Rural District: Hoseynabad-e Goruh

Population (2006)
  - Total: 76
- Time zone: UTC+3:30 (IRST)
  - Summer (DST): UTC+4:30 (IRDT)

Dozduiyeh (Persian: دوزدوئيه, also Romanized as Dozdū’īyeh) is a village in Hoseynabad-e Goruh Rural District, Rayen District, Kerman County, Kerman Province, Iran. At the 2006 census, its population was 76, in 23 families.
