= Divani =

Divani (Persian: ديواني) may refer to:

- Divani, Kerman
- Divani, Khuzestan
