= Gishigan-e Bala =

Village in Iran

Gishigan-e Bala گيشگان بالا
- Village
- Location within Iran
- Coordinates: 29°22′47″N 57°23′11″E
- Country: Iran
- Province: Kerman
- County: Kerman
- Bakhsh: Rayen
- Rural District: Hoseynabad-e Goruh

Population (2006)
  - Total: 50
- Time zone: UTC+3:30 (IRST)
  - Summer (DST): UTC+4:30 (IRDT)

Gishigan-e Bala (Persian: گيشگان بالا, also Romanized as Gīshīgān-e Bālā; also known as Geshīgān, Geshīgān-e Bālā, Gīshīgān, and Gīshīgān-e ‘Olyā) is a village in Hoseynabad-e Goruh Rural District, Rayen District, Kerman County, Kerman Province, Iran. At the 2006 census, its population was 50, in 18 families.
