= Khvoruiyeh =

Khvoruiyeh خوروئيه
- Village
- Location within Iran
- Coordinates: 29°21′35″N 57°23′25″E
- Country: Iran
- Province: Kerman
- County: Kerman
- Bakhsh: Rayen
- Rural District: Hoseynabad-e Goruh

Population (2006)
  - Total: 32
- Time zone: UTC+3:30 (IRST)
  - Summer (DST): UTC+4:30 (IRDT)

Khvoruiyeh (Persian: خوروئيه, also Romanized as Khvorū’īyeh, Khowrū’īyeh, and Khūrū’īyeh) is a village in Hoseynabad-e Goruh Rural District, Rayen District, Kerman County, Kerman Province, Iran. At the 2006 census, its population was 32, in 7 families.
