= Kahuiyeh =

Kahuiyeh (Persian: كهوييه) may refer to:

- Kahuiyeh, Kerman
- Kahuiyeh-ye Olya, Baft County
