= Dasht-e Bezanjun =

Dasht-e Bezanjun دشت بزنجون
- Village
- Location within Iran
- Coordinates: 29°25′34″N 57°43′41″E
- Country: Iran
- Province: Kerman
- County: Kerman
- Bakhsh: Rayen
- Rural District: Rayen

Population (2006)
  - Total: 45
- Time zone: UTC+3:30 (IRST)
  - Summer (DST): UTC+4:30 (IRDT)

Dasht-e Bezanjun (Persian: دشت بزنجون, also Romanized as Dasht-e Bezanjūn; also known as Dash-e Bezenjan and Dasht-e Bezanjān) is a village in Rayen Rural District, Rayen District, Kerman County, Kerman Province, Iran. At the 2006 census, its population was 45, in 10 families.
