= Tutak =

Tutak or Tootak (Persian: توتك) may refer to:

== Afghanistan ==
- Tutak, Badakhshan
- Tutak, Badghis
- Tutak, Daykundi
- Tutak, Farah
- Tutak, Ghor
- Tutak, Helmand
- Tutak, Herat
- Tutak, Khost
- Tutak, Takhar

== Iran ==
- Tutak, Isfahan
- Tutak, Gilan
- Tutak-e Olya, Kerman province
- Tutak-e Sofla, Kerman province
- Tutak, Sistan and Baluchestan
- Tutak, Iranshahr, Sistan and Baluchestan province
- Tutak, South Khorasan
- Tutak, Tehran
- Tutak, Marvast, Yazd province
- Tutak Rural District, Yazd province

== Pakistan ==
- Tutak, Pakistan

== Turkey ==
- Tutak, Turkey, Ağrı Province
- Tutak District, Ağrı Province

== Uzbekistan ==
- Tutak, Uzbekistan
