= Gishigan =

Gishigan گشيگان
- Village
- Location within Iran
- Coordinates: 29°22′41″N 57°23′46″E
- Country: Iran
- Province: Kerman
- County: Kerman
- Bakhsh: Rayen
- Rural District: Hoseynabad-e Goruh

Population (2006)
  - Total: 71
- Time zone: UTC+3:30 (IRST)
  - Summer (DST): UTC+4:30 (IRDT)

Gishigan (Persian: گشيگان, also Romanized as Gīshīgān; also known as Gīshīgān-e Pā’īn and Gīshīgān-e Soflá) is a village in Hoseynabad-e Goruh Rural District, Rayen District, Kerman County, Kerman Province, Iran. At the 2006 census, its population was 71, in 25 families.
