= Sarfeh =

Sarfeh صرفه
- Village
- Location within Iran
- Coordinates: 29°22′00″N 57°20′00″E
- Country: Iran
- Province: Kerman
- County: Kerman
- Bakhsh: Rayen
- Rural District: Hoseynabad-e Goruh

Population (2006)
  - Total: 44
- Time zone: UTC+3:30 (IRST)
  - Summer (DST): UTC+4:30 (IRDT)

Sarfeh (Persian: صرفه, also Romanized as Şarfeh) is a village in Hoseynabad-e Goruh Rural District, Rayen District, Kerman County, Kerman Province, Iran. At the 2006 census, its population was 44, in 12 families.
