= Kam Sorkh =

Kam Sorkh كمسرخ
- Village
- Location within Iran
- Coordinates: 29°21′44″N 57°17′59″E
- Country: Iran
- Province: Kerman
- County: Kerman
- Bakhsh: Rayen
- Rural District: Hoseynabad-e Goruh

Population (2006)
  - Total: 31
- Time zone: UTC+3:30 (IRST)
  - Summer (DST): UTC+4:30 (IRDT)

Kam Sorkh (Persian: كمسرخ; also known as Kamsurkh) is a village in Hoseynabad-e Goruh Rural District, Rayen District, Kerman County, Kerman Province, Iran. At the 2006 census, its population was 31, in 9 families.
