= Barsuz =

Barreh Suz برسوز
- Village
- Location within Iran
- Coordinates: 29°22′56″N 57°25′07″E
- Country: Iran
- Province: Kerman
- County: Kerman
- Bakhsh: Rayen
- Rural District: Hoseynabad-e Goruh

Population (2006)
  - Total: 39
- Time zone: UTC+3:30 (IRST)
  - Summer (DST): UTC+4:30 (IRDT)

Barreh Suz (Persian: برسوز, also Romanized as Barsūz; also known as Bahr Sūz and Barreh Sūz) is a village in Hoseynabad-e Goruh Rural District, Rayen District, Kerman County, Kerman Province, Iran. At the 2006 census, its population was 39, in 9 families.
