= Bab Goruiyeh =

Bab Goruiyeh باب گروييه
- Village
- Location within Iran
- Coordinates: 29°22′28″N 57°24′12″E
- Country: Iran
- Province: Kerman
- County: Kerman
- Bakhsh: Rayen
- Rural District: Hoseynabad-e Goruh

Population (2006)
  - Total: 21
- Time zone: UTC+3:30 (IRST)
  - Summer (DST): UTC+4:30 (IRDT)

Bab Goruiyeh (Persian: باب گروييه, also Romanized as Bāb Gorūīyeh; also known as Bāb Gorūh) is a village in Hoseynabad-e Goruh Rural District, Rayen District, Kerman County, Kerman Province, Iran. At the 2006 census, its population was 21, in 7 families.
