= Khich =

Khich خيچ
- Village
- Location within Iran
- Coordinates: 29°26′06″N 57°42′15″E
- Country: Iran
- Province: Kerman
- County: Kerman
- Bakhsh: Rayen
- Rural District: Rayen

Population (2006)
  - Total: 34
- Time zone: UTC+3:30 (IRST)
  - Summer (DST): UTC+4:30 (IRDT)

Khich (Persian: خيچ, also Romanized as Khīch; also known as Khīj) is a village in Rayen Rural District, Rayen District, Kerman County, Kerman Province, Iran. At the 2006 census, its population was 34, in 8 families.
