= Bahram Jerd =

Village in Kerman province, Iran

Bahram Jerd بهرامجرد
- Village
- Location within Iran
- Coordinates: 29°35′09″N 57°30′24″E
- Country: Iran
- Province: Kerman
- County: Kerman
- Bakhsh: Rayen
- Rural District: Rayen

Population (2006)
  - Total: 22
- Time zone: UTC+3:30 (IRST)
  - Summer (DST): UTC+4:30 (IRDT)

Bahram Jerd (Persian: بهرامجرد) (Note: Also Romanized as Bahrām Jerd) is a village in Rayen Rural District, Rayen District, Kerman County, Kerman province, Iran. At the 2006 census, its population was 22, in 6 families.
