= Senjed Boland-e Olya =

Senjed Boland-e Olya سنجدبلندبالا عليا
- Village
- Location within Iran
- Coordinates: 29°22′39″N 57°26′50″E
- Country: Iran
- Province: Kerman
- County: Kerman
- Bakhsh: Rayen
- Rural District: Hoseynabad-e Goruh

Population (2006)
  - Total: 41
- Time zone: UTC+3:30 (IRST)
  - Summer (DST): UTC+4:30 (IRDT)

Senjed Boland-e Olya (Persian: سنجدبلندبالا عليا, also Romanized as Senjed Boland-e ‘Olyā; also known as Sanjed Boland-e Bālā) is a village in Hoseynabad-e Goruh Rural District, Rayen District, Kerman County, Kerman Province, Iran. At the 2006 census, its population was 41, in 9 families.
