= Gahuiyeh =

Gahuiyeh (Persian: گهوييه) may refer to:

- Gahuiyeh, Baft
- Gahuiyeh, Kerman
