= Ney Bid =

Ney Bid ني بيد
- Village
- Location within Iran
- Coordinates: 29°41′59″N 57°37′48″E
- Country: Iran
- Province: Kerman
- County: Kerman
- Bakhsh: Rayen
- Rural District: Rayen

Population (2006)
  - Total: 25
- Time zone: UTC+3:30 (IRST)
  - Summer (DST): UTC+4:30 (IRDT)

Ney Bid (Persian: ني بيد, also Romanized as Ney Bīd; also known as Nabīd) is a village in Rayen Rural District, Rayen District, Kerman County, Kerman Province, Iran. At the 2006 census, its population was 25, in 6 families.
