= Zahrud-e Pain =

Village in Kerman, Iran

Zahrud-e Pain ظهرودپائين
- Village
- Location within Iran
- Coordinates: 29°35′47″N 57°20′53″E
- Country: Iran
- Province: Kerman
- County: Kerman
- Bakhsh: Rayen
- Rural District: Rayen

Population (2006)
  - Total: 18
- Time zone: UTC+3:30 (IRST)
  - Summer (DST): UTC+4:30 (IRDT)

Zahrud-e Pain (Persian: ظهرودپائين, also Romanized as Z̧ahrūd-e Pā’īn and Zahrūd Pāīn; also known as Z̧ahr Rūd-e Pā’īn, Z̧ahrūd, Z̧ahrūd-e Soflá, Zar Rūd, and Zar Rūd Pā’īn) is a village in Rayen Rural District, Rayen District, Kerman County, Kerman Province, Iran. At the 2006 census, its population was 18, in 6 families.
