= Hekmatabad-e Pain =

Village in Kerman, Iran

Hekmatabad-e Pain حكمت ابادپائين
- Village
- Location within Iran
- Coordinates: 29°32′07″N 57°32′05″E
- Country: Iran
- Province: Kerman
- County: Kerman
- Bakhsh: Rayen
- Rural District: Rayen

Population (2006)
  - Total: 19
- Time zone: UTC+3:30 (IRST)
  - Summer (DST): UTC+4:30 (IRDT)

Hekmatabad-e Pain (Persian: حكمت ابادپائين, also Romanized as Ḩekmatābād-e Pā’īn; also known as Ḩekmatābād) is a village in Rayen Rural District, Rayen District, Kerman County, Kerman Province, Iran. At the 2006 census, its population was 19, in 6 families.
