= Gazak, Kerman =

Village in Kerman province, Iran

Gazak Persian: گزك
- Village
- Location within Iran
- Coordinates: 29°40′15″N 57°22′42″E
- Country: Iran
- Province: Kerman
- County: Kerman
- District: Rayen
- Rural District: Rayen

Population (2016)
  - Total: 745
- Time zone: UTC+3:30 (IRST)

Gazak (Persian: گزك) (Note: Also known as Gask, Gaz, and Kask) is a village in Rayen Rural District of Rayen District, Kerman County, Kerman province, Iran.

== Demographics ==
=== Population ===
At the time of the 2006 National Census, the village's population was 622 in 168 households. The following census in 2011 counted 1,298 people in 335 households. The 2016 census measured the population of the village as 745 people in 217 households. It was the most populous village in its rural district.
