= Deh-e Mirza, Kerman =

Village in Kerman province, Iran

Deh-e Mirza Persian: ده ميرزا
- Village
- Location within Iran
- Coordinates: 29°35′34″N 57°29′05″E
- Country: Iran
- Province: Kerman
- County: Kerman
- District: Rayen
- Rural District: Rayen

Population (2016)
  - Total: 143
- Time zone: UTC+3:30 (IRST)

Deh-e Mirza (Persian: ده ميرزا) (Note: Also romanized as Deh Mīrzā and Deh-e Mīrzā) is a village in, and the capital of, Rayen Rural District of Rayen District, Kerman County, Kerman province, Iran.

== Demographics ==
=== Population ===
At the time of the 2006 National Census, the village's population was 169 in 44 households. The following census in 2011 counted 133 people in 40 households. The 2016 census measured the population of the village as 143 people in 43 households.
