= Qasr-e Mian =

Qasr-e Mian قصرميان
- Village
- Location within Iran
- Coordinates: 29°26′09″N 57°41′36″E
- Country: Iran
- Province: Kerman
- County: Kerman
- Bakhsh: Rayen
- Rural District: Rayen

Population (2006)
  - Total: 73
- Time zone: UTC+3:30 (IRST)
  - Summer (DST): UTC+4:30 (IRDT)

Qasr-e Mian (Persian: قصرميان, also Romanized as Qaşr-e Mīān, Qasr-e-Mīyan, Qasr-i- Mīān, and Qāsr-e Meyān; Dīvānī and Quer-i-Mīān) is a village in Rayen Rural District, Rayen District, Kerman County, Kerman Province, Iran. At the 2006 census, its population was 73, in 17 families.
