= Guder (disambiguation) =

Guder is a town in Ethiopia.

Guder may also refer to:

- Guder River, Ethiopia
- Guder, Iran, a village in Kerman Province, Iran
- Güder, Bayburt, a village in Bayburt Province, Turkey
- Güder, Vezirköprü, a village in Samsun Province, Turkey
- Darrell Guder, American theologian and professor at Princeton Theological Seminary
