= Gudar =

Gudar گودر
- Village
- Location within Iran
- Coordinates: 29°44′46″N 57°15′13″E
- Country: Iran
- Province: Kerman
- County: Kerman
- Bakhsh: Rayen
- Rural District: Rayen

Population (2006)
  - Total: 164
- Time zone: UTC+3:30 (IRST)
  - Summer (DST): UTC+4:30 (IRDT)

Gudar (Persian: گودر, also Romanized as Gūdar, Gowdar, and Gūder) is a village in Rayen Rural District, Rayen District, Kerman County, Kerman Province, Iran. At the 2006 census, its population was 164, in 33 families.

== See also ==
- Gudar people
