= Tutak-e Olya =

Tutak-e Olya توتك عليا
- Village
- Location within Iran
- Coordinates: 29°20′43″N 57°32′05″E
- Country: Iran
- Province: Kerman
- County: Kerman
- Bakhsh: Rayen
- Rural District: Hoseynabad-e Goruh

Population (2006)
  - Total: 25
- Time zone: UTC+3:30 (IRST)
  - Summer (DST): UTC+4:30 (IRDT)

Tutak-e Olya (Persian: توتك عليا, also Romanized as Tūtak-e ‘Olyā; also known as Tūtak, Tūtak Bālā, Tūtak-e Bālā, and Tūtang-e Bālā) is a village in Hoseynabad-e Goruh Rural District, Rayen District, Kerman County, Kerman Province, Iran. At the 2006 census, its population was 25, in 6 families.
