= Goruh, Kerman =

Village in Kerman province, Iran

Goruh Persian: گروه
- Village
- Location within Iran
- Coordinates: 29°21′17″N 57°21′30″E
- Country: Iran
- Province: Kerman
- County: Kerman
- District: Rayen
- Rural District: Hoseynabad-e Goruh

Population (2016)
  - Total: 580
- Time zone: UTC+3:30 (IRST)

Goruh (Persian: گروه) (Note: Also romanized as Gorooh, Gorūh, and Gorveh; also known as Gorū, Gooroo, and Guru) is a village in, and the capital of, Hoseynabad-e Goruh Rural District of Rayen District, Kerman County, Kerman province, Iran.

== Demographics ==
=== Population ===
At the time of the 2006 National Census, the village's population was 453 in 107 households. The following census in 2011 counted 1,230 people in 350 households. The 2016 census measured the population of the village as 580 people in 184 households. It was the most populous village in its rural district.
