= Tutak-e Sofla =

Village in Kerman, Iran

Tutak-e Sofla توتك سفلي
- Village
- Location within Iran
- Coordinates: 29°20′27″N 57°32′13″E
- Country: Iran
- Province: Kerman
- County: Kerman
- Bakhsh: Rayen
- Rural District: Hoseynabad-e Goruh

Population (2006)
  - Total: 32
- Time zone: UTC+3:30 (IRST)
  - Summer (DST): UTC+4:30 (IRDT)

Tutak-e Sofla (Persian: توتك سفلي, also Romanized as Tūtak-e Soflá; also known as Tootak, Tūtak, Tūtak-e Pā’īn, Tūtak-Pā’īn, and Tūtang-e Pā’īn) is a village in Hoseynabad-e Goruh Rural District, Rayen District, Kerman County, Kerman Province, Iran. At the 2006 census, its population was 32, in 7 families.
