= Rayen Castle =

Medieval fortress in Iran

Coordinates: 29.5931°N 57.4381°E

Rayen Citadel ارگ راین
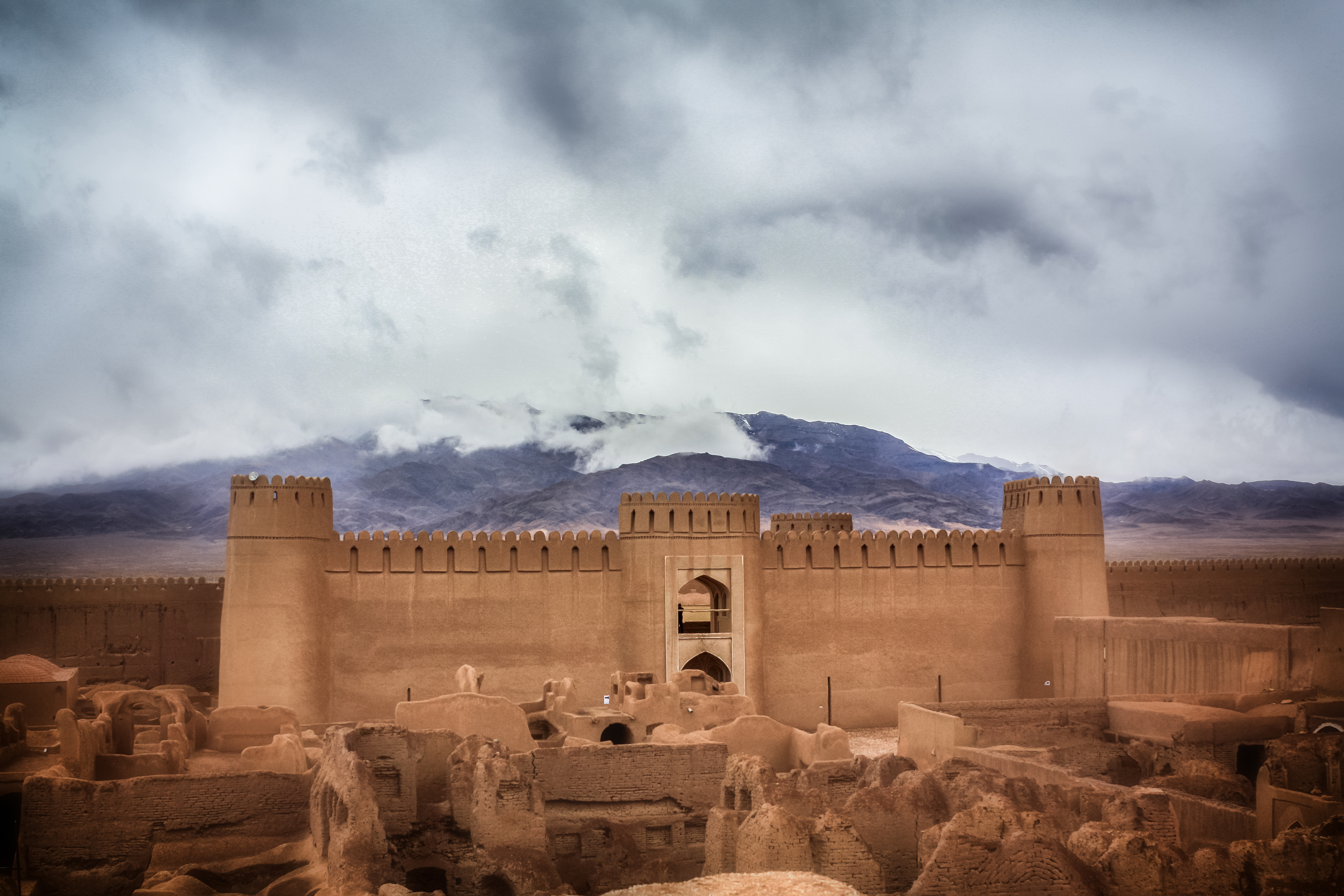
- A view of Arg-e Rayen
- Interactive map of Rayen Citadel ارگ راین
- Type: Castle
- Location: Kerman, Iran
- Region: Rayen

Site notes
- Material: Adobe
- Elevation: 2,200 m (7,200 ft)
- Length

Iran National Heritage List
- Official name: Rayen Fortress
- Type: Citadel
- Designated: 1966
- Reference no.: 520
- Conservation organization: Cultural Heritage, Handicrafts and Tourism Organization of Iran
- Public access: yes

The Rayen Citadel (Persian: ارگ راين, romanized: Arg-e Rāyen) is a historic adobe fortress situated in the city of Rayen, about 100 kilometers south of Kerman, Iran. The castle and the mudbrick city it protects display numerous architectural elements and design strategies recognized as hallmarks of Iranian citadels. The complex is well preserved despite numerous natural disasters that have destroyed similar structures nearby, including Arg-e Bam, which was destroyed in an earthquake in December 2003.

Rayen is assumed to have been inhabited until 1868. Although believed to be at least 1,000 years old, it may have foundations dating to the pre-Islamic Sasanian era, with later additions and renovations during the Islamic era. According to contemporary documents, it was situated on an important trade route and was a centre for trading valuable goods and quality textiles, as well as for sword and knife manufacturing and, later, guns. During the reign of the last Sasanian king, Yazdegerd III, the Arabs failed to conquer the city presumably due to its high walls. Today, Rayen Castle is a popular tourist destination, with efforts being made to preserve its cultural significance and secure its proposed inclusion on the list of UNESCO World Heritage Sites.

== Gallery ==
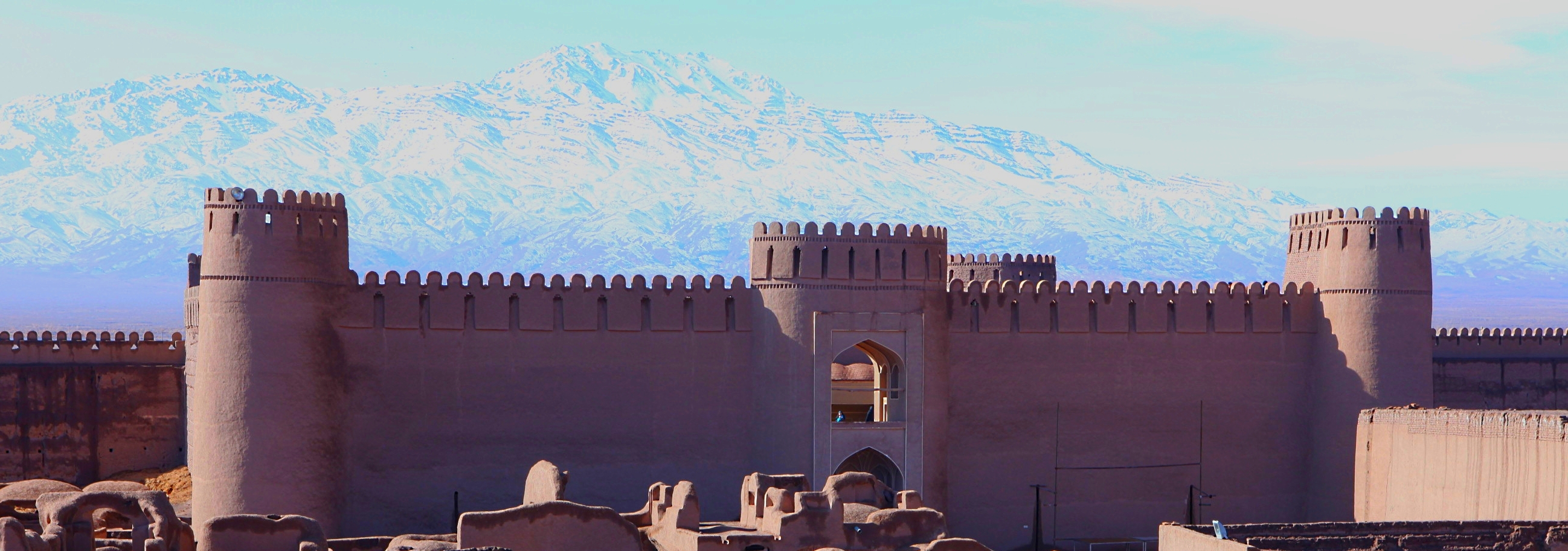
Castle's gate

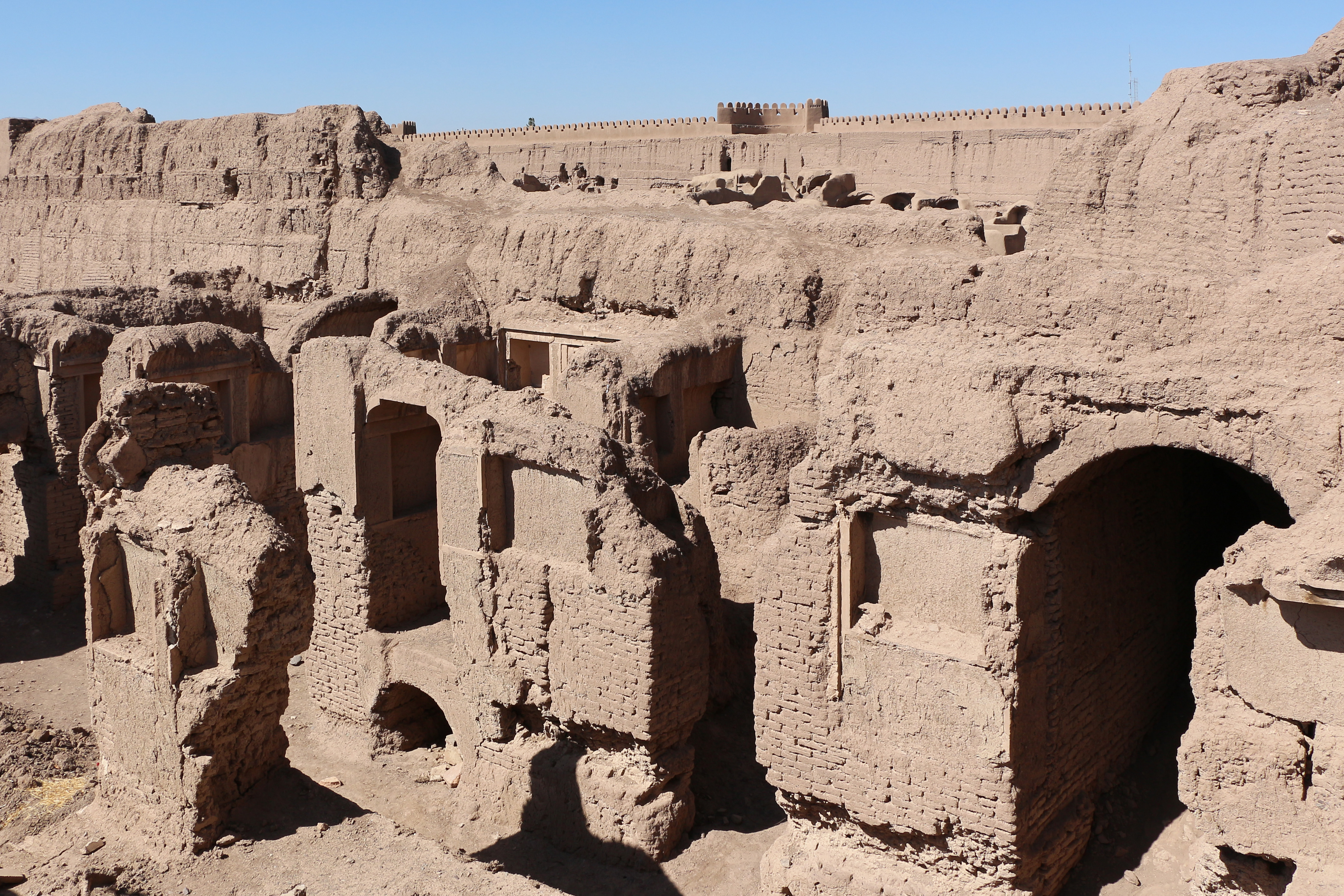
Inside of the castle

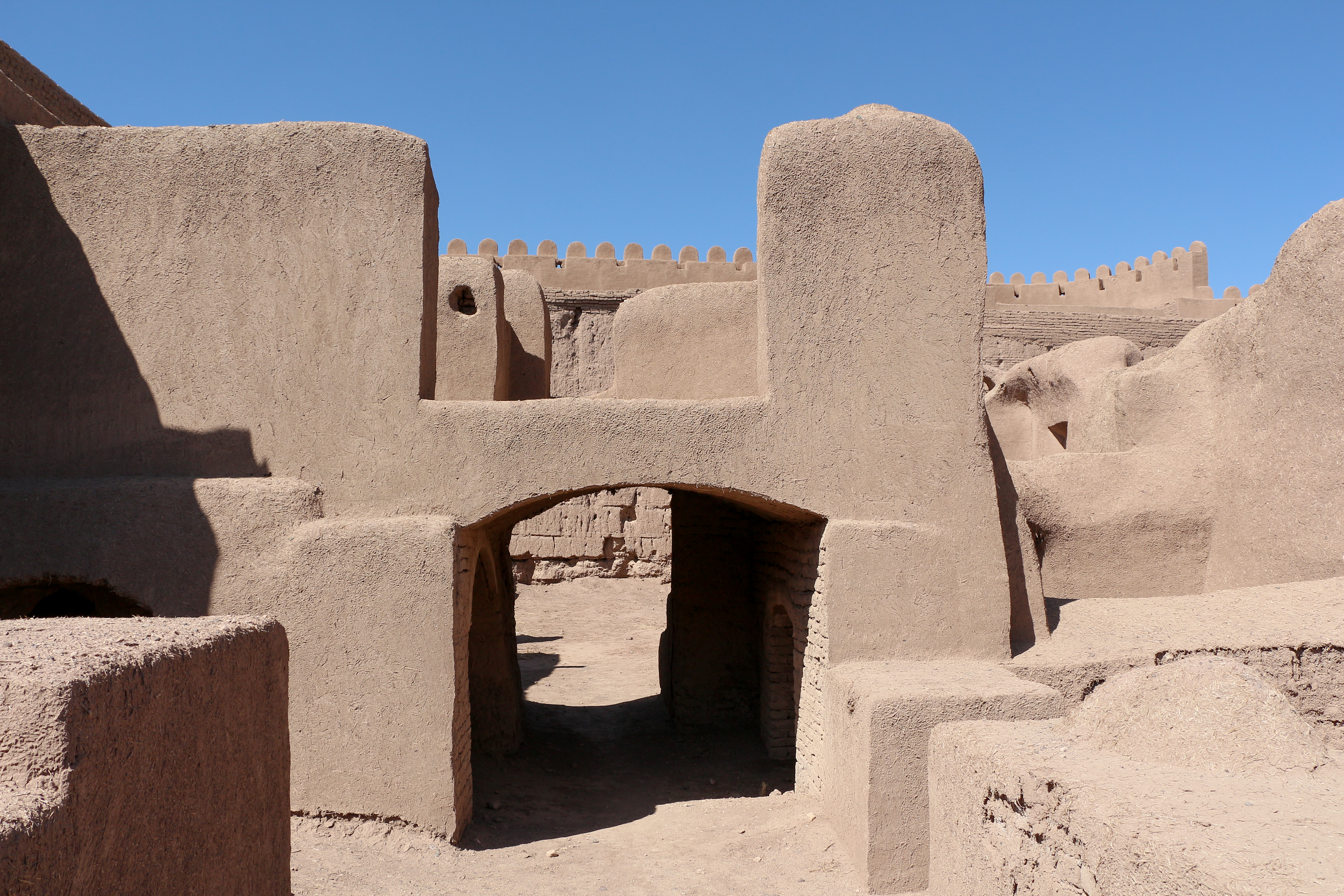

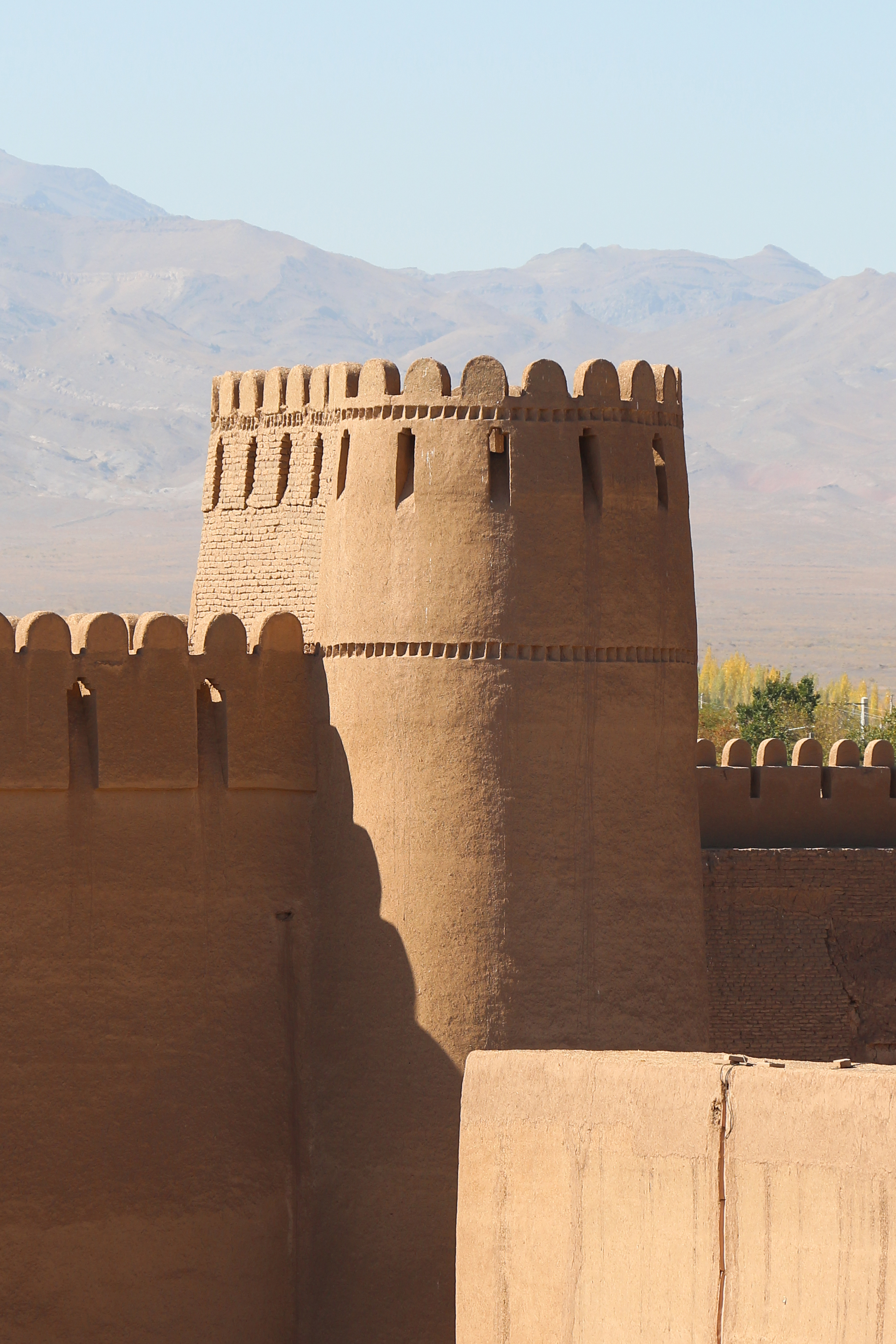
A tower of the castle

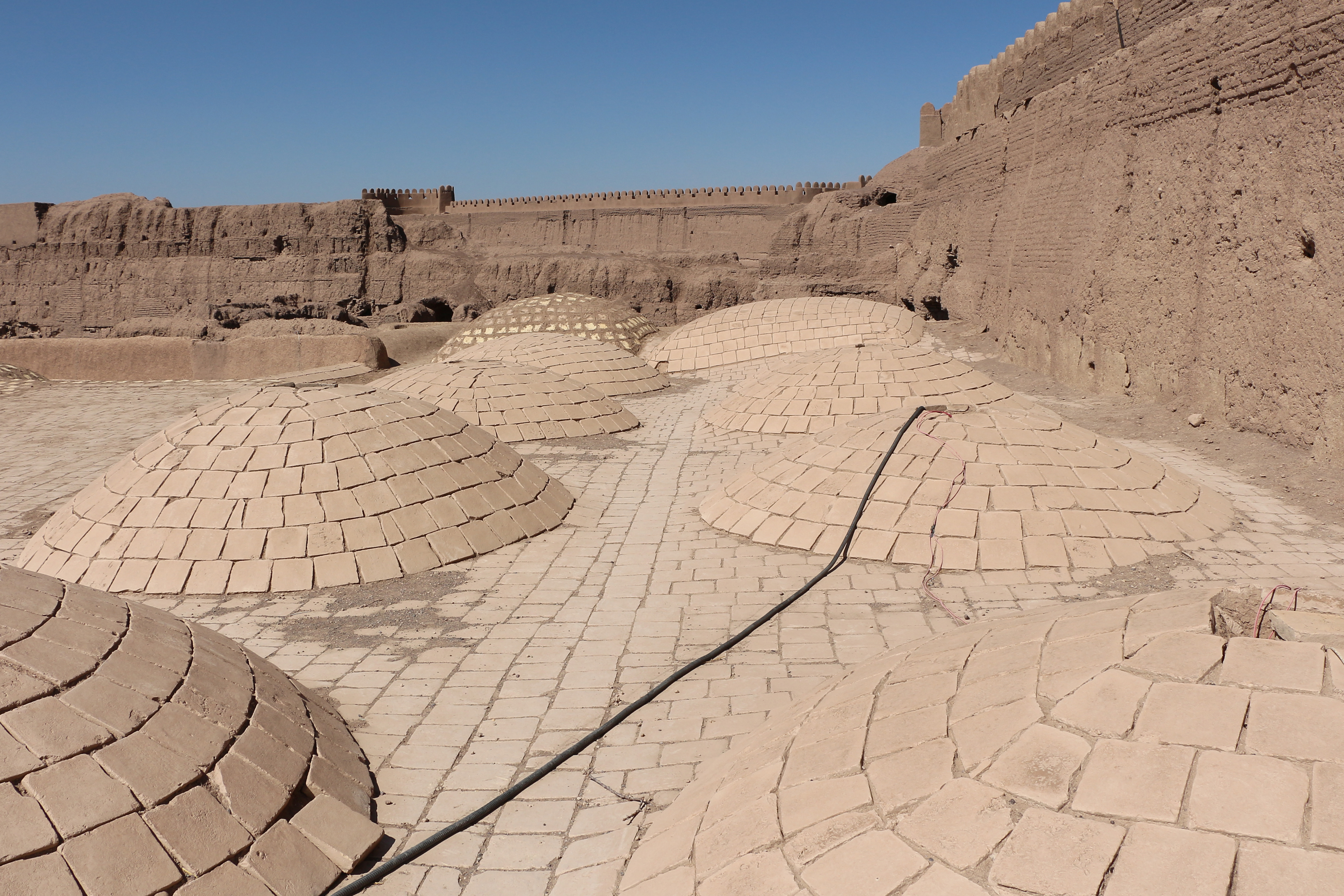

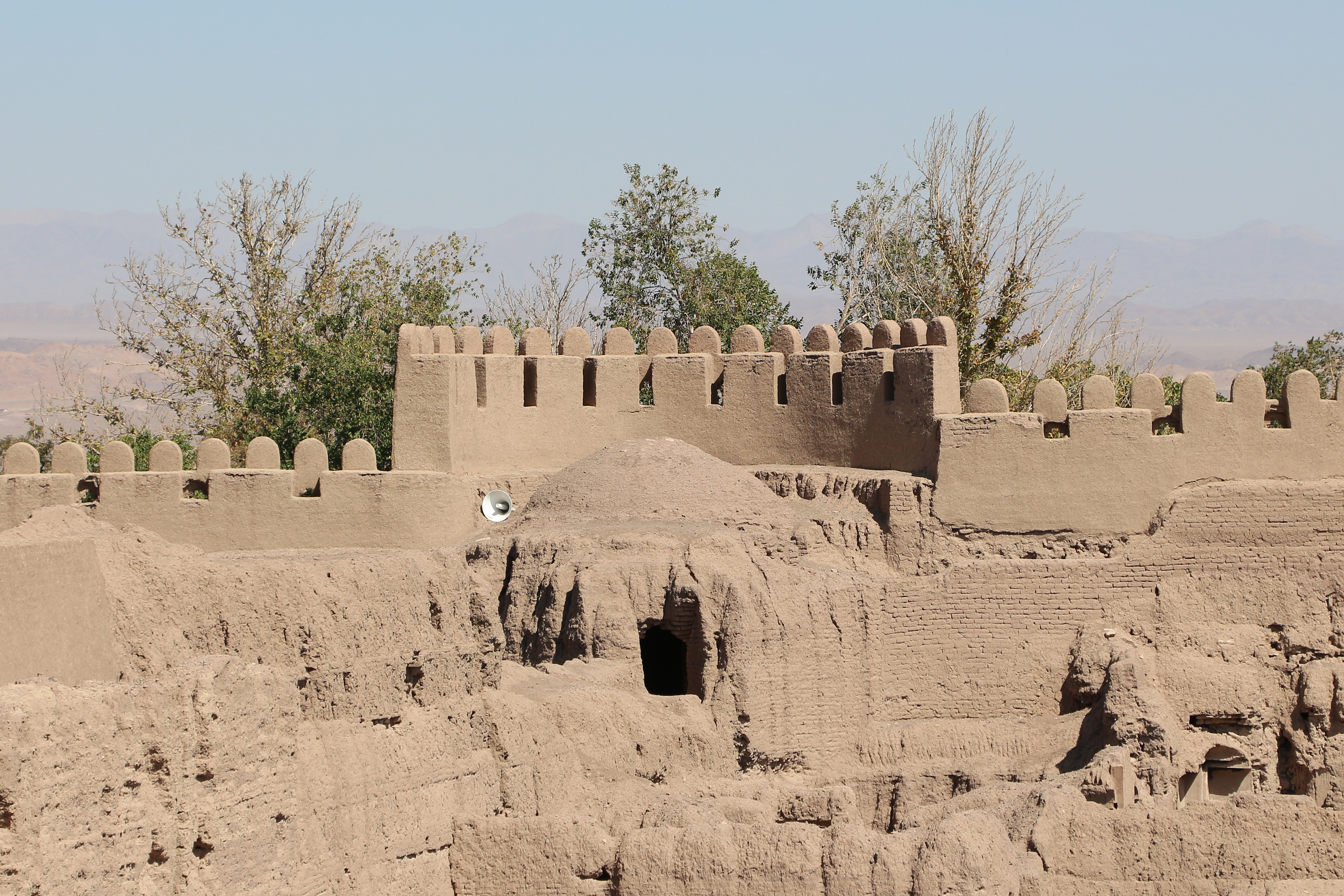

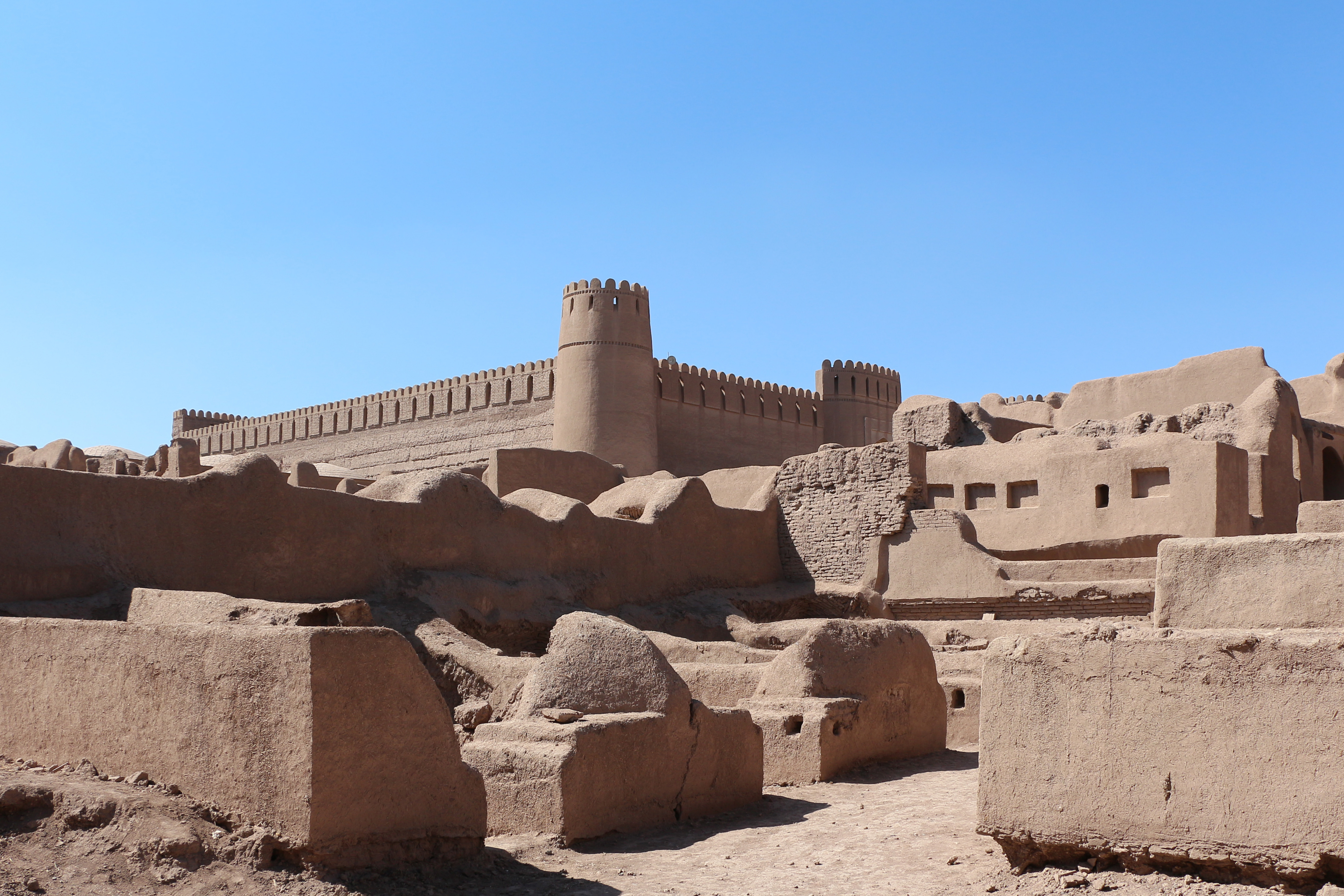

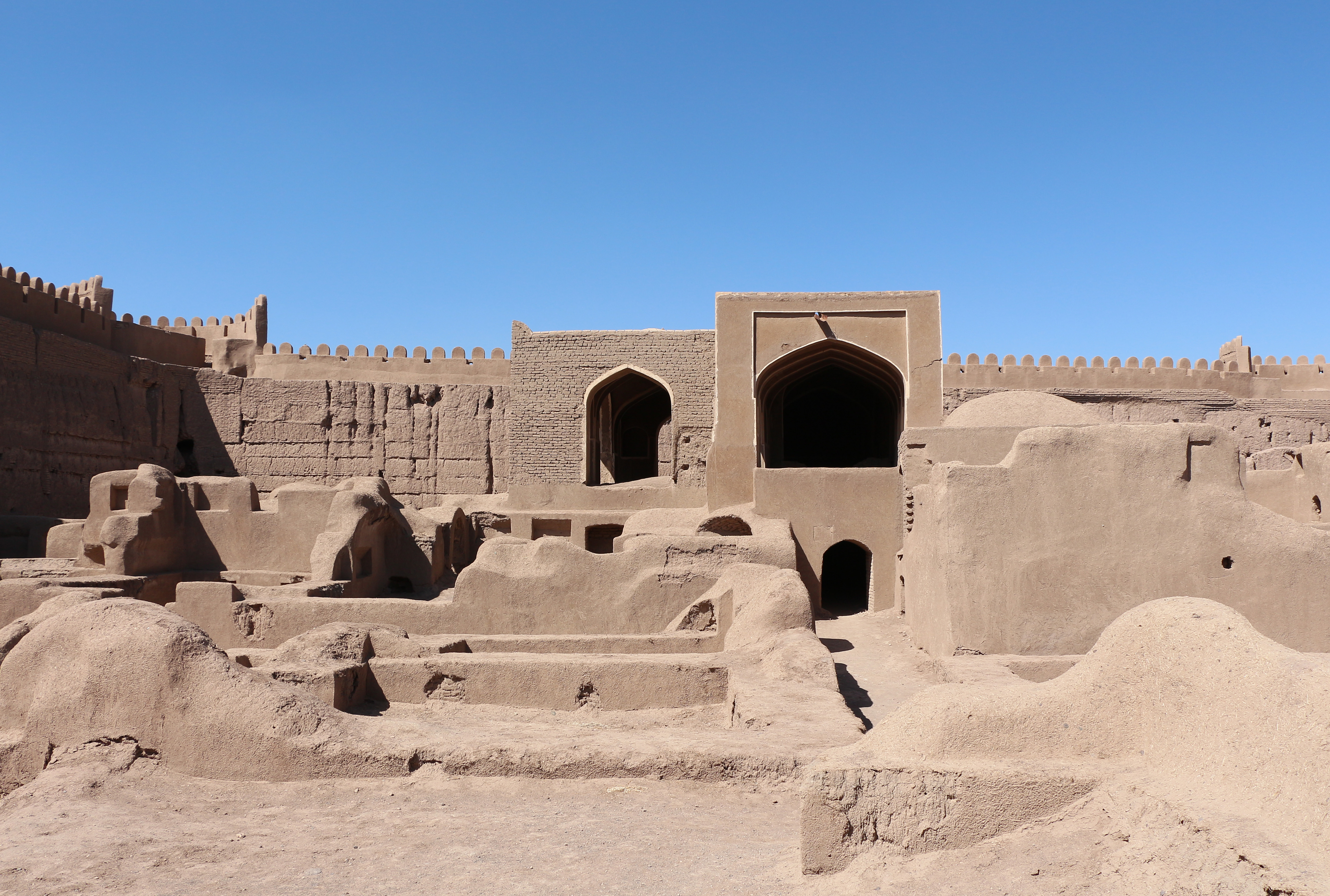

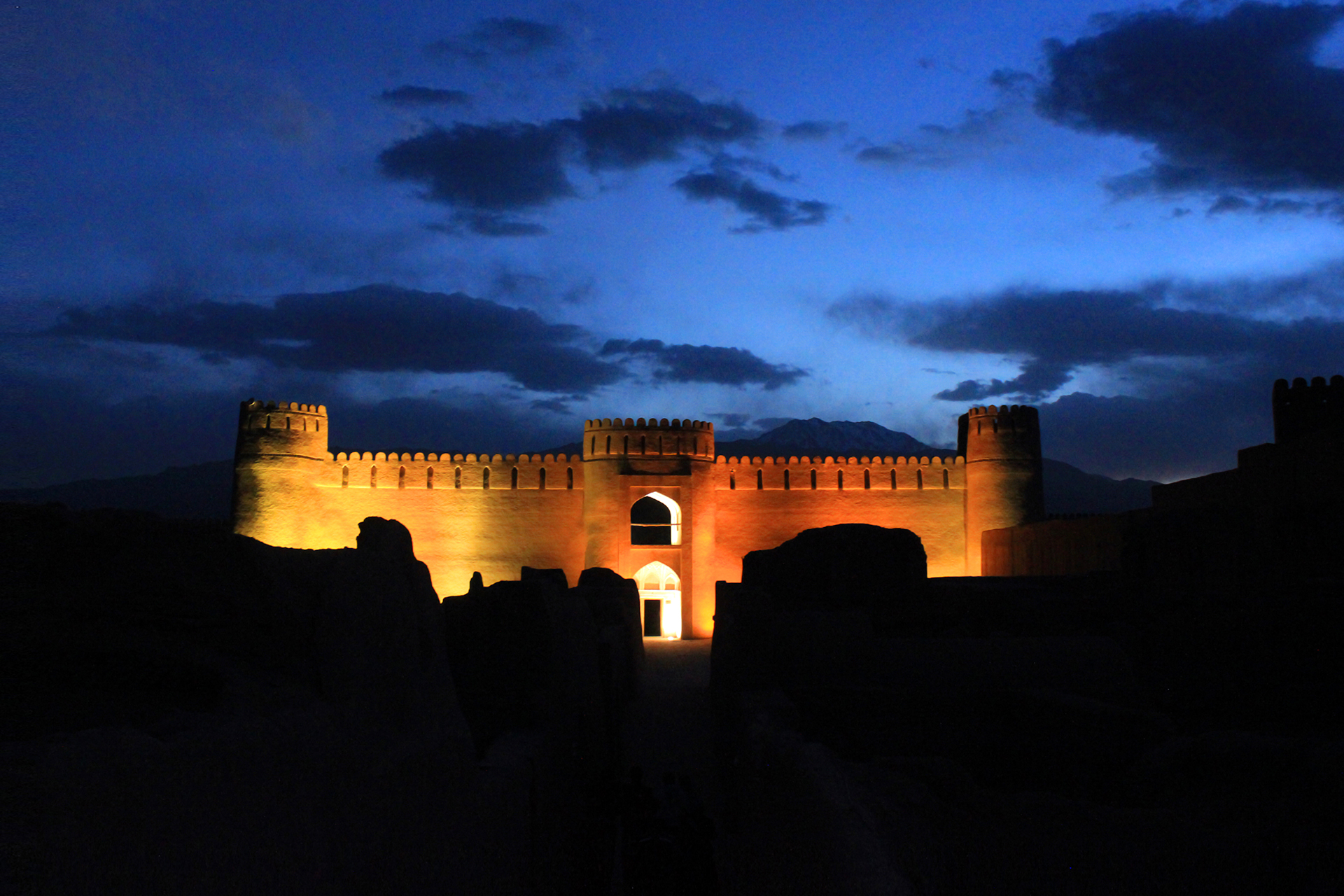
View at night

== See also ==
- List of Iranian castles
- Iranian architecture
