= Gahuiyeh, Kerman =

Gahuiyeh گهوييه
- Village
- Location within Iran
- Coordinates: 29°24′20″N 57°24′47″E
- Country: Iran
- Province: Kerman
- County: Kerman
- Bakhsh: Rayen
- Rural District: Hoseynabad-e Goruh

Population (2006)
  - Total: 65
- Time zone: UTC+3:30 (IRST)
  - Summer (DST): UTC+4:30 (IRDT)

Gahuiyeh (Persian: گهوييه, also Romanized as Gahū’īyeh; also known as Gahu and Kahū’īyeh) is a village in Hoseynabad-e Goruh Rural District, Rayen District, Kerman County, Kerman Province, Iran. At the 2006 census, its population was 65, in 19 families.
