= Rayen =

City in Kerman province, Iran

Rayen Persian: راین
- City
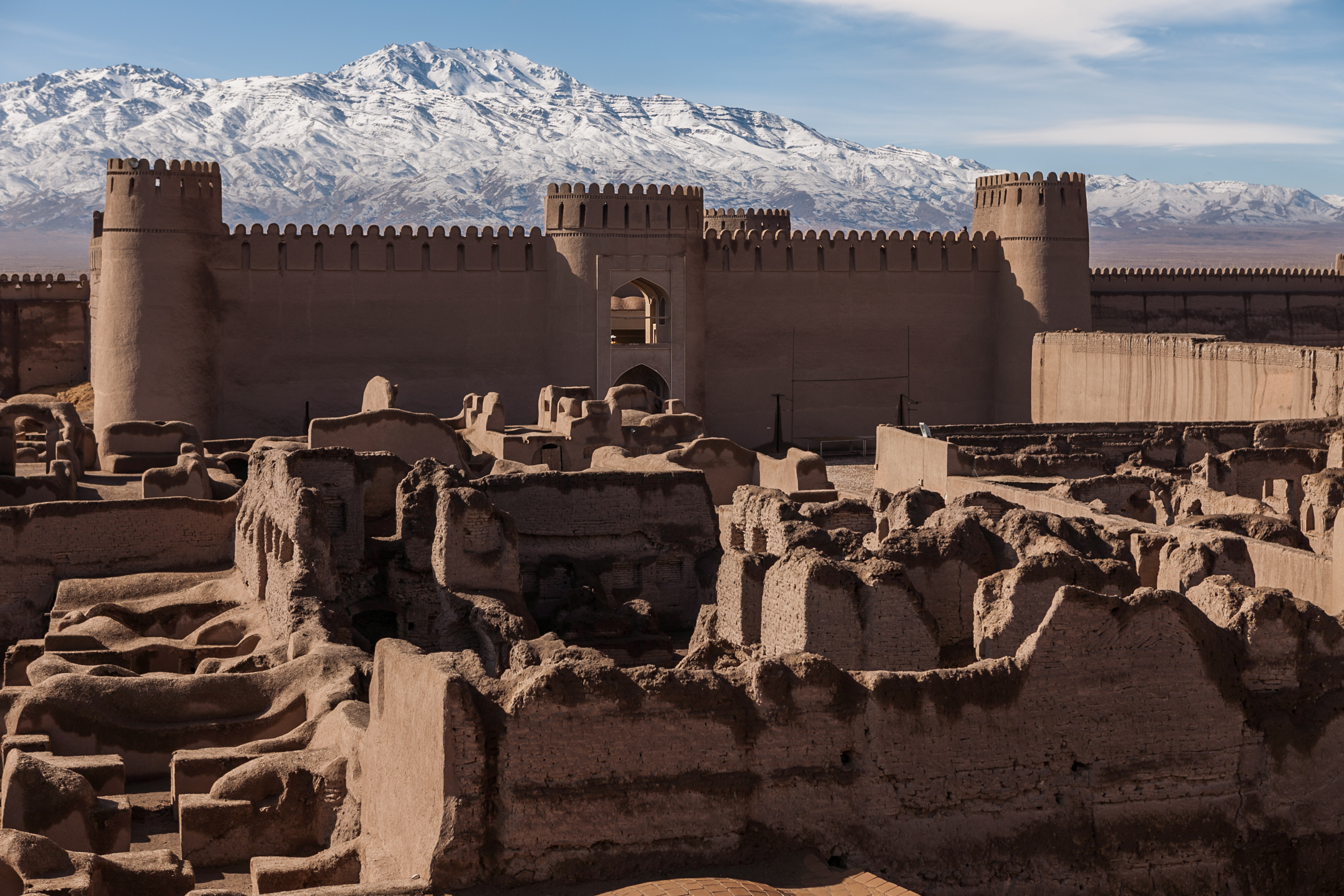

- Location within Iran
- Coordinates: 29°35′53″N 57°26′18″E
- Country: Iran
- Province: Kerman
- County: Kerman
- District: Rayen

Population (2016)
  - Total: 10,286
- Time zone: UTC+3:30 (IRST)

Rayen (Persian: راین) (Note: Also romanized as Rāyen; also known as Rāyni) is a city in, and the capital of, Rayen District of Kerman County, Kerman province, Iran.

== Demographics ==
=== Population ===
At the time of the 2006 National Census, the city's population was 9,623 in 2,405 households. The following census in 2011 counted 11,006 people in 2,895 households. The 2016 census measured the population of the city as 10,286 people in 3,041 households.

== Historical monuments ==
Rayen Castle is located in the city, a site of notable historical events.

== See also ==
Rayene chaib
