= Gahuiyeh, Baft =

Gahuiyeh گهوييه
- Village
- Location within Iran
- Coordinates: 29°23′31″N 56°20′01″E
- Country: Iran
- Province: Kerman
- County: Baft
- Bakhsh: Central
- Rural District: Fathabad

Population (2006)
  - Total: 18
- Time zone: UTC+3:30 (IRST)
  - Summer (DST): UTC+4:30 (IRDT)

Gahuiyeh (Persian: گهوييه, also Romanized as Gahū’īyeh; also known as Gahūeeyeh) is a village in Fathabad Rural District, in the Central District of Baft County, Kerman Province, Iran. At the 2006 census, its population was 18, in 5 families.
