= Rayen Rural District =

Rural district in Kerman province, Iran

Rayen Rural District Persian: دهستان راين
- Rural District
- Location within Iran
- Coordinates: 29°37′01″N 57°29′17″E
- Country: Iran
- Province: Kerman
- County: Kerman
- District: Rayen
- Capital: Deh-e Mirza

Population (2016)
  - Total: 2,798
- Time zone: UTC+3:30 (IRST)

Rayen Rural District (Persian: دهستان راين) is in Rayen District of Kerman County, Kerman province, Iran. Its capital is the village of Deh-e Mirza.

== Demographics ==
=== Population ===
At the time of the 2006 National Census, the rural district's population was 2,195 in 567 households. There were 3,770 inhabitants in 1,018 households at the following census of 2011. The 2016 census measured the population of the rural district as 2,798 in 850 households. The most populous of its 137 villages was Gazak, with 745 people.
