= Hoseynabad-e Goruh Rural District =

Rural district in Kerman province, Iran

Hoseynabad-e Goruh Rural District Persian: دهستان حسين آباد گروه
- Rural District
- Location within Iran
- Coordinates: 29°21′52″N 57°26′29″E
- Country: Iran
- Province: Kerman
- County: Kerman
- District: Rayen
- Capital: Goruh

Population (2016)
  - Total: 2,588
- Time zone: UTC+3:30 (IRST)

Hoseynabad va Goruh Rural District (Persian: دهستان حسين آباد و گروه) is in Rayen District of Kerman County, Kerman province, Iran. Its capital is the village of Goruh.

== Demographics ==
=== Population ===
At the time of the 2006 National Census, the rural district's population was 2,085 in 541 households. There were 3,274 inhabitants in 948 households at the following census of 2011. The 2016 census measured the population of the rural district as 2,588 in 832 households. The most populous of its 67 villages was Goruh, with 580 people.
