= Rayen District =

District in Kerman province, Iran

Rayen District Persian: بخش راین
- District
- Location within Iran
- Coordinates: 29°34′34″N 57°29′17″E
- Country: Iran
- Province: Kerman
- County: Kerman
- Capital: Rayen

Population (2016)
  - Total: 15,672
- Time zone: UTC+3:30 (IRST)

Rayen District (Persian: بخش راین) is in Kerman County, Kerman province, Iran. Its capital is the city of Rayen.

== Demographics ==
=== Population ===
At the time of the 2006 National Census, the district's population was 13,903 in 3,513 households. The following census in 2011 counted 18,050 people in 4,861 households. The 2016 census measured the population of the district as 15,672 inhabitants in 4,723 households.

=== Administrative divisions ===
Rayen District Population
Administrative Divisions	2006	2011	2016
Hoseynabad-e Goruh RD	2,085	3,274	2,588
Rayen RD	2,195	3,770	2,798
Rayen (city)	9,623	11,006	10,286
Total	13,903	18,050	15,672
RD = Rural District
