= Karimabad, Kalat =

Village in Razavi Khorasan province, Iran

Karimabad Persian: كريم اباد
- Village
- Location within Iran
- Coordinates: 37°09′10″N 59°31′59″E
- Country: Iran
- Province: Razavi Khorasan
- County: Kalat
- District: Hezarmasjed
- Rural District: Layen

Population (2016)
  - Total: 397
- Time zone: UTC+3:30 (IRST)

Karimabad (Persian: كريم اباد) (Note: Also romanized as Karīmābād) is a village in Layen Rural District of Hezarmasjed District in Kalat County, Razavi Khorasan province, Iran.

== Demographics ==
=== Population ===
At the time of the 2006 National Census, the village's population was 393 in 89 households, when it was in Hezarmasjed Rural District of the Central District. The following census in 2011 counted 379 people in 96 households. The 2016 census measured the population of the village as 397 people in 112 households.

In 2021, the rural district was separated from the district in the formation of Hezarmasjed District, and Karimabad was transferred to Layen Rural District created in the new district.
