= Robat, Hezarmasjed =

Village in Razavi Khorasan province, Iran

Robat Persian: رباط
- Village
- Location within Iran
- Coordinates: 37°05′08″N 59°28′41″E
- Country: Iran
- Province: Razavi Khorasan
- County: Kalat
- District: Hezarmasjed
- Rural District: Layen

Population (2016)
  - Total: 364
- Time zone: UTC+3:30 (IRST)

Robat (Persian: رباط) (Note: Also romanized as Robāţ) is a village in Layen Rural District of Hezarmasjed District in Kalat County, Razavi Khorasan province, Iran.

== Demographics ==
=== Population ===
At the time of the 2006 National Census, the village's population was 362 in 92 households, when it was in Hezarmasjed Rural District of the Central District. The following census in 2011 counted 311 people in 97 households. The 2016 census measured the population of the village as 364 people in 127 households.

In 2021, the rural district was separated from the district in the formation of Hezarmasjed District, and Robat was transferred to Layen Rural District created in the new district.
