= Sirzar =

Sirzar or Sir Zar (Persian: سيرزار) may refer to:

- Sirzar, Lorestan
- Sirzar, Kalat, Razavi Khorasan Province
- Sir Zar, Zavin, Razavi Khorasan Province
- Sirzar, Mashhad, Razavi Khorasan Province
