= Baba Ramazan =

Village in Razavi Khorasan province, Iran

Baba Ramazan Persian: بابارمضان
- Village
- Location within Iran
- Coordinates: 37°04′46″N 59°26′49″E
- Country: Iran
- Province: Razavi Khorasan
- County: Kalat
- District: Hezarmasjed
- Rural District: Layen

Population (2016)
  - Total: 278
- Time zone: UTC+3:30 (IRST)

Baba Ramazan (Persian: بابارمضان) (Note: Also romanized as Bābā Ramaẕān) is a village in Layen Rural District of Hezarmasjed District in Kalat County, Razavi Khorasan province, Iran.

Baba Ramazan is 48 kilometers from Kalat-e Nader and 190 kilometers from Mashhad, the provincial capital, near the Hazarmasjed Mountains. The villagers speak Turkish and Kurdish. The area thrives on agriculture and tourism. Local dishes include grilled chicken, grilled fish, chelow kebab, abgoosht (a traditional meat stew), ashkeneh kashk (a type of yogurt soup), and herb kuku (a type of Persian frittata).

== Demographics ==
=== Population ===
At the time of the 2006 National Census, the village's population was 273 in 69 households, when it was in Hezarmasjed Rural District of the Central District. The following census in 2011 counted 217 people in 73 households. The 2016 census measured the population of the village as 278 people in 92 households.

In 2021, the rural district was separated from the district in the formation of Hezarmasjed District, and Baba Ramazan was transferred to Layen Rural District created in the new district.

== Geography ==
A key attraction of the village is the perennial and abundant Layn-e Now (Baba Ramazan) River, which originates from the Hazarmasjed Mountains. After traveling a long path, it reaches Baba Ramazan village and then flows to the city of Hasanabad Layn-e Now, enriching the environment with lush greenery. This village, located in the Central District of Kalat County, has been recognized as the first organic village in Iran and has received an international certification from BCS Germany, the first organic product inspection company in Europe. Below are brief descriptions of some attractions:

=== Baba Ramazan Waterfall ===
Located in the village of Baba Ramazan at the foothills of the Hazarmasjed Mountains, this waterfall is also known as Layn-e Now Waterfall. It has a height of 10 meters and a powerful water flow that creates a thunderous sound.

=== Arghoon Shah Castle ===
Situated 44 kilometers from Baba Ramazan village, Arghoon Shah Castle dates back to the Ilkhanate era. The historical structure was guarded by towers on either side, the most notable being the Arghoon Shah Tower, a partially conical brick building standing 35 meters above the riverbed of Zharf River.

== Tourism ==
The primary attraction drawing visitors to Baba Ramazan is its perennial and abundant river. The village is a scenic destination with enticing hiking heights, lush valleys, and roaring rivers. Notable tourist sites include the Sun Palace, Naderi Inscription, Naderi Dam, Arghoon Shah Castle, Artakand Waterfall, Qara Soo Waterfall, and Charm Waterfall.
