= Sang Divar =

Village in Razavi Khorasan province, Iran

Sang Divar Persian: سنگديوار
- Village
- Location within Iran
- Coordinates: 37°10′23″N 59°32′24″E
- Country: Iran
- Province: Razavi Khorasan
- County: Kalat
- District: Hezarmasjed
- Rural District: Layen

Population (2016)
  - Total: 252
- Time zone: UTC+3:30 (IRST)

Sang Divar (Persian: سنگديوار) (Note: Also romanized as Sang Dīvār; also known as Sangetown, Sangīfān, and Sangyufan) is a village in Layen Rural District of Hezarmasjed District in Kalat County, Razavi Khorasan province, Iran.

== Demographics ==
=== Population ===
At the time of the 2006 National Census, the village's population was 220 in 50 households, when it was in Hezarmasjed Rural District of the Central District. The following census in 2011 counted 182 people in 48 households. The 2016 census measured the population of the village as 252 people in 83 households.

In 2021, the rural district was separated from the district in the formation of Hezarmasjed District, and Sang Divar was transferred to Layen Rural District created in the new district.
