= Ahmadabad, Kalat =

Village in Razavi Khorasan province, Iran

Ahmadabad Persian: احمداباد
- Village
- Location within Iran
- Coordinates: 37°06′37″N 59°29′49″E
- Country: Iran
- Province: Razavi Khorasan
- County: Kalat
- District: Hezarmasjed
- Rural District: Layen

Population (2016)
  - Total: 480
- Time zone: UTC+3:30 (IRST)

Ahmadabad (Persian: احمداباد) (Note: Also romanized as Aḩmadābād) is a village in, and the capital of, Layen Rural District in Hezarmasjed District of Kalat County, Razavi Khorasan province, Iran.

== Demographics ==
=== Population ===
At the time of the 2006 National Census, the village's population was 454 in 112 households, when it was in Hezarmasjed Rural District of the Central District. The following census in 2011 counted 406 people in 116 households. The 2016 census measured the population of the village as 480 people in 141 households.

In 2021, the rural district was separated from the district in the formation of Hezarmasjed District, and Ahmadabad was transferred to Layen Rural District created in the new district.
