= Zow-e Bala =

Village in Razavi Khorasan province, Iran

Zow-e Bala Persian: زوبالا
- Village
- Country: Iran
- Province: Razavi Khorasan
- County: Kalat
- District: Hezarmasjed
- Rural District: Layen

Population (2016)
  - Total: 0
- Time zone: UTC+3:30 (IRST)

Zow-e Bala (Persian: زوبالا) (Note: Also romanized as Zow-e Bālā) is a village in Layen Rural District of Hezarmasjed District in Kalat County, Razavi Khorasan province, Iran.

== Demographics ==
=== Population ===
At the time of the 2006 National Census, the village's population was 10 in four households, when it was in Hezarmasjed Rural District of the Central District. The village did not appear in the following census of 2011. The 2016 census measured the population of the village as zero.

In 2021, the rural district was separated from the district in the formation of Hezarmasjed District, and Zow-e Bala was transferred to Layen Rural District created in the new district.
