= Jushin =

Jushin or Jooshin or Jowshin (Persian: جوشين) may refer to:

- Jushin, East Azerbaijan
- Jushin, Kerman
- Jushin, South Khorasan
- Jushin Rural District, in East Azerbaijan Province

== See also ==
- Jushin Liger (born 1964), Japanese wrestler
