= Azizabad, Kalat =

Village in Razavi Khorasan province, Iran

Azizabad Persian: عزيزاباد
- Village
- Location within Iran
- Country: Iran
- Province: Razavi Khorasan
- County: Kalat
- District: Hezarmasjed
- Rural District: Layen

Population (2016)
  - Total: 20
- Time zone: UTC+3:30 (IRST)

Azizabad (Persian: عزيزاباد) (Note: Also romanized as ‘Azīzābād) is a village in Layen Rural District of Hezarmasjed District in Kalat County, Razavi Khorasan province, Iran.

== Demographics ==
=== Population ===
At the time of the 2006 National Census, the village's population was 45 in nine households, when it was in Hezarmasjed Rural District of the Central District. The following census in 2011 counted 32 people in 10 households. The 2016 census measured the population of the village as 20 people in six households.

In 2021, the rural district was separated from the district in the formation of Hezarmasjed District, and Azizabad was transferred to Layen Rural District created in the new district.
