= Chahar Rah, Razavi Khorasan =

Village in Razavi Khorasan province, Iran

Chahar Rah Persian: چهارراه
- Village
- Location within Iran
- Coordinates: 37°02′45″N 59°25′38″E
- Country: Iran
- Province: Razavi Khorasan
- County: Kalat
- District: Hezarmasjed
- Rural District: Layen

Population (2016)
  - Total: 30
- Time zone: UTC+3:30 (IRST)

Chahar Rah (Persian: چهارراه) (Note: Also romanized as Chahār Rāh) is a village in Layen Rural District of Hezarmasjed District in Kalat County, Razavi Khorasan province, Iran.

== Demographics ==
=== Population ===
At the time of the 2006 National Census, the village's population was 52 in 15 households, when it was in Hezarmasjed Rural District of the Central District. The following census in 2011 counted 25 people in eight households. The 2016 census measured the population of the village as 30 people in 11 households.

In 2021, the rural district was separated from the district in the formation of Hezarmasjed District, and Chahar Rah was transferred to Layen Rural District created in the new district.
