= Layen-e Kohneh =

Village in Razavi Khorasan province, Iran

Layen-e Kohneh Persian: لائين كهنه
- Village
- Location within Iran
- Coordinates: 37°03′41″N 59°24′02″E
- Country: Iran
- Province: Razavi Khorasan
- County: Kalat
- District: Hezarmasjed
- Rural District: Layen

Population (2016)
  - Total: 32
- Time zone: UTC+3:30 (IRST)

Layen-e Kohneh (Persian: لائين كهنه) (Note: Also romanized as Lāyen-e Kohneh) is a village in Layen Rural District of Hezarmasjed District in Kalat County, Razavi Khorasan province, Iran.

== Demographics ==
=== Population ===
At the time of the 2006 National Census, the village's population was 86 in 18 households, when it was in Hezarmasjed Rural District of the Central District. The following census in 2011 counted 27 people in nine households. The 2016 census measured the population of the village as 32 people in 12 households.

In 2021, the rural district was separated from the district in the formation of Hezarmasjed District, and Layen-e Kohneh was transferred to Layen Rural District created in the new district.
