= Khakestar =

Village in Razavi Khorasan province, Iran

Khakestar Persian: خاكستر
- Village and Historical Settlement
- Location within Iran
- Coordinates: 37°03′12″N 59°26′59″E
- Country: Iran
- Province: Razavi Khorasan
- County: Kalat
- District: Hezarmasjed
- Rural District: Layen

Population (2016)
  - Total: 21
- Time zone: UTC+3:30 (IRST)

Khakestar (Persian: خاکستر) (Note: Also romanized as Khākestar; also known as Rībāt-i-Khākistar) is a village, historical settlement, and caravanserai in Layen Rural District of Hezarmasjed District in Kalat County, Razavi Khorasan province, Iran.

Khakestar is in Khorasan in the mountains that now separate Iran from Turkmenistan. Formerly a customs post on the border between Qajar Iran and Imperial Russia, it is on the banks of the Layen stream, which flows down from there to Kaakhka in Turkmenistan. It is surrounded by hills with a large sugar loaf-shaped mountain on one side, and it has a spring.

== History ==
The 11th-century Seljuk emir Savtegin was born at Khakestar, and he later built a ribat (i.e. caravanserai) here.

In the late 1800s, Mirza Reza Khan Arfa od-Dowleh visited the village of Khakestar after hearing a story about its inhabitants' longevity. He wrote that it was close enough to Quchan that someone could leave Quchan in the morning, eat lunch in Khakestar, and be back in Quchan by the evening. Its buildings were made of mud, with roofs variously made from wood or reeds. There were 80 families and many of the villagers were old; there was virtually no surplus food production; when young people matured and married they would emigrate from the village. In years where the harvest was good, their diet consisted of wheat bread and dairy products: milk, cheese, and yogurt. When the wheat harvest was poor, they would eat barley bread. Their main subsistence was from keeping livestock and selling wool in the markets at Quchan or Shirvan; they had no fruit orchards and bought fruit, clothes, and dishes at the markets.

In 1918, the British agent Reginald Teague-Jones stopped at Khakestar on his way from Mashhad into Russian territory; at that time, Khakestar was a quarantine post for travellers coming into Iran from Russia, where there was an outbreak of cholera at the time.

== Demographics ==
=== Population ===
At the time of the 2006 National Censuses, the village's population was below the reporting threshold, when it was in Hezarmasjed Rural District of the Central District. The 2016 census measured the population of the village as 21 people in nine households.

In 2021, the rural district was separated from the district in the formation of Hezarmasjed District, and Khakestar was transferred to Layen Rural District created in the new district.
