= Hesar-e Hajji Esmail =

Village in Razavi Khorasan province, Iran

Hesar-e Hajji Esmail Persian: حصارحاجي اسماعيل
- Village
- Location within Iran
- Coordinates: 37°05′40″N 59°36′47″E
- Country: Iran
- Province: Razavi Khorasan
- County: Kalat
- District: Central
- Rural District: Charam

Population (2016)
  - Total: 151
- Time zone: UTC+3:30 (IRST)

Hesar-e Hajji Esmail (Persian: حصارحاجي اسماعيل) (Note: Also romanized as Ḩeşār-e Ḩājjī Esmāʿīl; also known as Ḩeşār) is a village in Charam Rural District of the Central District in Kalat County, Razavi Khorasan province, Iran.

== Demographics ==
=== Population ===
At the time of the 2006 National Census, the village's population was 157 in 42 households, when it was in Kabud Gonbad Rural District. The following census in 2011 counted 145 people in 43 households. The 2016 census measured the population of the village as 151 people in 43 households.

In 2021, Hesar-e Hajji Esmail was transferred to the new Charam Rural District.
