= Hajjiabad, Kalat =

Village in Razavi Khorasan province, Iran

Hajjiabad Persian: حاجي اباد
- Village
- Location within Iran
- Coordinates: 37°08′47″N 59°30′33″E
- Country: Iran
- Province: Razavi Khorasan
- County: Kalat
- District: Hezarmasjed
- Rural District: Hezarmasjed

Population (2016)
  - Total: 236
- Time zone: UTC+3:30 (IRST)

Hajjiabad (Persian: حاجي اباد) (Note: Also romanized as Ḩājjīābād) is a village in Hezarmasjed Rural District of Hezarmasjed District in Kalat County, Razavi Khorasan province, Iran.

== Demographics ==
=== Population ===
At the time of the 2006 National Census, the village's population was 221 in 51 households, when it was in the Central District). The following census in 2011 counted 201 people in 52 households. The 2016 census measured the population of the village as 236 people in 70 households.

In 2021, the rural district was separated from the district in the formation of Hezarmasjed District.
