= Sini-ye Now =

Village in Razavi Khorasan province, Iran

Sini-ye Now Persian: سيني نو
- Village
- Location within Iran
- Coordinates: 37°04′04″N 59°36′23″E
- Country: Iran
- Province: Razavi Khorasan
- County: Kalat
- District: Central
- Rural District: Charam

Population (2016)
  - Total: 119
- Time zone: UTC+3:30 (IRST)

Sini-ye Now (Persian: سيني نو) (Note: Also romanized as Sīnī-ye Now) is a village in Charam Rural District of the Central District in Kalat County, Razavi Khorasan province, Iran.

== Demographics ==
=== Population ===
At the time of the 2006 National Census, the village's population was 144 in 40 households, when it was in Kabud Gonbad Rural District. The following census in 2011 counted 120 people in 34 households. The 2016 census measured the population of the village as 119 people in 41 households.

In 2021, Sini-ye Now was transferred to the new Charam Rural District.
