= Asadabad, Kalat =

Village in Razavi Khorasan province, Iran

Asadabad Persian: اسداباد
- Village
- Location within Iran
- Country: Iran
- Province: Razavi Khorasan
- County: Kalat
- District: Hezarmasjed
- Rural District: Hezarmasjed

Population (2016)
  - Total: 122
- Time zone: UTC+3:30 (IRST)

Asadabad (Persian: اسداباد) (Note: Also romanized as Asadābād) is a village in Hezarmasjed Rural District of Hezarmasjed District in Kalat County, Razavi Khorasan province, Iran.

== Demographics ==
=== Population ===
At the time of the 2006 National Census, the village's population was 156 in 35 households, when it was in the Central District). The following census in 2011 counted 128 people in 37 households. The 2016 census measured the population of the village as 122 people in 37 households.

In 2021, the rural district was separated from the district in the formation of Hezarmasjed District.
