= Sini, Razavi Khorasan =

Village in Razavi Khorasan province, Iran

Sini Persian: سيني
- Village
- Location within Iran
- Coordinates: 37°00′45″N 59°35′16″E
- Country: Iran
- Province: Razavi Khorasan
- County: Kalat
- District: Central
- Rural District: Charam

Population (2016)
  - Total: 378
- Time zone: UTC+3:30 (IRST)

Sini (Persian: سيني) (Note: Also romanized as Sīnī) is a village in Charam Rural District of the Central District in Kalat County, Razavi Khorasan province, Iran.

== Demographics ==
=== Population ===
At the time of the 2006 National Census, the village's population was 529 in 144 households, when it was in Kabud Gonbad Rural District. The following census in 2011 counted 354 people in 115 households. The 2016 census measured the population of the village as 378 people in 137 households.

In 2021, Sini was transferred to the new Charam Rural District.
