= Kalu, Kalat =

Village in Razavi Khorasan province, Iran

Kalu Persian: كالو
- Village
- Location within Iran
- Coordinates: 37°09′30″N 59°26′53″E
- Country: Iran
- Province: Razavi Khorasan
- County: Kalat
- District: Hezarmasjed
- Rural District: Hezarmasjed

Population (2016)
  - Total: 588
- Time zone: UTC+3:30 (IRST)

Kalu (Persian: كالو) (Note: Also romanized as Kālū) is a village in, and the capital of, Hezarmasjed Rural District in Hezarmasjed District of Kalat County, Razavi Khorasan province, Iran. The previous capital of the rural district was the village of Hasanabad, now the city of Hasanabad-e Layen-e Now.

== Demographics ==
=== Population ===
At the time of the 2006 National Census, the village's population was 594 in 140 households, when it was in the Central District). The following census in 2011 counted 545 people in 155 households. The 2016 census measured the population of the village as 588 people in 181 households.

In 2021, the rural district was separated from the district in the formation of Hezarmasjed District.
