= Archangan =

Village in Razavi Khorasan province, Iran

Archangan Persian: ارچنگان
- Village
- Location within Iran
- Coordinates: 37°06′58″N 59°35′56″E
- Country: Iran
- Province: Razavi Khorasan
- County: Kalat
- District: Central
- Rural District: Charam

Population (2016)
  - Total: 224
- Time zone: UTC+3:30 (IRST)

Archangan (Persian: ارچنگان) (Note: Also romanized as Archangān; also known as Archanangūān) is a village in Charam Rural District of the Central District in Kalat County, Razavi Khorasan province, Iran.

== Demographics ==
=== Population ===
At the time of the 2006 National Census, the village's population was 260 in 75 households, when it was in Kabud Gonbad Rural District. The following census in 2011 counted 239 people in 80 households. The 2016 census measured the population of the village as 224 people in 71 households.

In 2021, Archangan was transferred to the new Charam Rural District.
