= Qabakh =

Village in Razavi Khorasan province, Iran

Qabakh Persian: قاباخ
- Village
- Location within Iran
- Coordinates: 37°05′39″N 59°34′32″E
- Country: Iran
- Province: Razavi Khorasan
- County: Kalat
- District: Central
- Rural District: Charam

Population (2016)
  - Total: 268
- Time zone: UTC+3:30 (IRST)

Qabakh (Persian: قاباخ) (Note: Also romanized as Qābākh) is a village in Charam Rural District of the Central District in Kalat County, Razavi Khorasan province, Iran.

== Demographics ==
=== Population ===
At the time of the 2006 National Census, the village's population was 242 in 72 households, when it was in Kabud Gonbad Rural District. The following census in 2011 counted 216 people in 71 households. The 2016 census measured the population of the village as 268 people in 87 households.

In 2021, Qabakh was transferred to the new Charam Rural District.
