= Hammam Qaleh =

Village in Razavi Khorasan province, Iran

Hammam Qaleh Persian: حمامقلعه
- Village
- Location within Iran
- Coordinates: 36°55′41″N 59°45′47″E
- Country: Iran
- Province: Razavi Khorasan
- County: Kalat
- District: Central
- Rural District: Charam

Population (2016)
  - Total: 631
- Time zone: UTC+3:30 (IRST)

Hammam Qaleh (Persian: حمامقلعه) (Note: Also romanized as Ḩammām Qal‘eh) is a village in Charam Rural District of the Central District in Kalat County, Razavi Khorasan province, Iran.

== Demographics ==
=== Population ===
At the time of the 2006 National Census, the village's population was 883 in 208 households, when it was in Kabud Gonbad Rural District. The following census in 2011 counted 822 people in 236 households. The 2016 census measured the population of the village as 631 people in 185 households.

In 2021, Hammam Qaleh was transferred to the new Charam Rural District.
