= Karnaveh-ye Shirin =

Village in Razavi Khorasan province, Iran

Karnaveh-ye Shirin Persian: كرناوه شيرين
- Village
- Location within Iran
- Coordinates: 37°14′11″N 59°26′47″E
- Country: Iran
- Province: Razavi Khorasan
- County: Kalat
- District: Hezarmasjed
- Rural District: Hezarmasjed

Population (2016)
  - Total: 381
- Time zone: UTC+3:30 (IRST)

Karnaveh-ye Shirin (Persian: كرناوه شيرين) (Note: Also romanized as Karnāveh-ye Shīrīn; also known as Karnāveh-ye Shīrān) is a village in Hezarmasjed Rural District of Hezarmasjed District in Kalat County, Razavi Khorasan province, Iran.

== Demographics ==
=== Population ===
At the time of the 2006 National Census, the village's population was 471 in 94 households, when it was in the Central District). The following census in 2011 counted 373 people in 100 households. The 2016 census measured the population of the village as 381 people in 110 households.

In 2021, the rural district was separated from the district in the formation of Hezarmasjed District.
