= Idah Lik =

Village in Razavi Khorasan province, Iran

Idah Lik Persian: ايده ليك
- Village
- Location within Iran
- Coordinates: 37°03′24″N 59°32′49″E
- Country: Iran
- Province: Razavi Khorasan
- County: Kalat
- District: Central
- Rural District: Charam

Population (2016)
  - Total: 664
- Time zone: UTC+3:30 (IRST)

Idah Lik (Persian: ايده ليك) (Note: Also romanized as Īdah Līk; also known as Īdalīk, Igdālīq, and Īldalīk) is a village in Charam Rural District of the Central District in Kalat County, Razavi Khorasan province, Iran.

== Demographics ==
=== Population ===
At the time of the 2006 National Census, the village's population was 914 in 227 households, when it was in Kabud Gonbad Rural District. The following census in 2011 counted 764 people in 236 households. The 2016 census measured the population of the village as 664 people in 221 households.

In 2021, Idah Lik was transferred to the new Charam Rural District.
