= Qeshlaq-e Hajjilar =

Qeshlaq-e Hajjilar or Qeshlaq Hajjilar (Persian: قشلاق حاجيلار) may refer to:

- Qeshlaq-e Hajjilar, Ahar
- Qeshlaq-e Hajjilar, Varzaqan
- Qeshlaq-e Hajjilar, alternate name of Hajjilar, Iran, Varzaqan County
