= Soltanabad, Kalat =

Village in Razavi Khorasan province, Iran

Soltanabad Persian: سلطان اباد
- Village
- Location within Iran
- Coordinates: 37°05′25″N 59°33′42″E
- Country: Iran
- Province: Razavi Khorasan
- County: Kalat
- District: Central
- Rural District: Charam

Population (2016)
  - Total: 153
- Time zone: UTC+3:30 (IRST)

Soltanabad (Persian: سلطان اباد) (Note: Also romanized as Solţānābād) is a village in Charam Rural District of the Central District in Kalat County, Razavi Khorasan province, Iran.

== Demographics ==
=== Population ===
At the time of the 2006 National Census, the village's population was 150 in 34 households, when it was in Kabud Gonbad Rural District. The following census in 2011 counted 146 people in 45 households. The 2016 census measured the population of the village as 153 people in 47 households.

In 2021, Soltanabad was transferred to the new Charam Rural District.
