= Ali Yar =

Ali Yar (Persian: علي يار) may refer to:

- Ali Yar, East Azerbaijan
- Ali Yar, Khuzestan
- Ali Yar, West Azerbaijan

== See also ==
- Aliar (disambiguation)
- Yar Ali (disambiguation)
