= Qarah Su, Razavi Khorasan =

Village in Razavi Khorasan province, Iran

Qarah Su Persian: قره سو
- Village
- Location within Iran
- Coordinates: 36°58′17″N 59°40′52″E
- Country: Iran
- Province: Razavi Khorasan
- County: Kalat
- District: Central
- Rural District: Charam

Population (2016)
  - Total: 16
- Time zone: UTC+3:30 (IRST)

Qarah Su (Persian: قره سو) (Note: Also romanized as Qarah Sū and Qareh Sū; also known as Qara Sū) is a village in Charam Rural District of the Central District in Kalat County, Razavi Khorasan province, Iran.

== Demographics ==
=== Population ===
At the time of the 2006 National Census, the village's population was 46 in 13 households, when it was in Kabud Gonbad Rural District. The following census in 2011 counted 48 people in 12 households. The 2016 census measured the population of the village as 16 people in seven households.

In 2021, Qarah Su was transferred to the new Charam Rural District.
