= Jalilabad, Kalat =

Village in Razavi Khorasan province, Iran

Jalilabad Persian: جليل اباد
- Village
- Location within Iran
- Coordinates: 36°57′48″N 59°45′04″E
- Country: Iran
- Province: Razavi Khorasan
- County: Kalat
- District: Central
- Rural District: Kabud Gonbad

Population (2016)
  - Total: 169
- Time zone: UTC+3:30 (IRST)

Jalilabad (Persian: جليل اباد) (Note: Also romanized as Jalīlābād) is a village in, and the capital of, Kabud Gonbad Rural District in the Central District of Kalat County, Razavi Khorasan province, Iran.

== Demographics ==
=== Population ===
At the time of the 2006 National Census, the village's population was 177 in 44 households. The following census in 2011 counted 184 people in 48 households. The 2016 census measured the population of the village as 169 people in 51 households.
