= Khalaj-e Sofla =

Village in Razavi Khorasan province, Iran

Khalaj-e Sofla Persian: خلج سفلي
- Village
- Location within Iran
- Coordinates: 37°00′10″N 59°51′10″E
- Country: Iran
- Province: Razavi Khorasan
- County: Kalat
- District: Central
- Rural District: Kabud Gonbad

Population (2016)
  - Total: 31
- Time zone: UTC+3:30 (IRST)

Khalaj-e Sofla (Persian: خلج سفلي) (Note: Also romanized as Khalaj-e Soflá; also known as Khalaj-e Pā’īn) is a village in Kabud Gonbad Rural District of the Central District in Kalat County, Razavi Khorasan province, Iran.

== Demographics ==
=== Population ===
At the time of the 2006 National Census, the village's population was 82 in 20 households. The following census in 2011 counted 49 people in 15 households. The 2016 census measured the population of the village as 31 people in 11 households.
