= Charam, Iran (disambiguation) =

Charam, Iran is a city in Kohgiluyeh and Boyer-Ahmad Province, Iran

Charam (Persian: چرام) in Iran may also refer to:

- Charam-e Kohneh, Razavi Khorasan Province
- Charam-e Now, Razavi Khorasan Province
- Charam County, in Kohgiluyeh and Boyer-Ahmad Province
- Charam Rural District, in Kohgiluyeh and Boyer-Ahmad Province
