= Garu, Kalat =

Village in Razavi Khorasan province, Iran

Garu Persian: گرو
- Village
- Location within Iran
- Coordinates: 37°01′53″N 59°41′16″E
- Country: Iran
- Province: Razavi Khorasan
- County: Kalat
- District: Central
- Rural District: Kabud Gonbad

Population (2016)
  - Total: 1,724
- Time zone: UTC+3:30 (IRST)

Garu (Persian: گرو) (Note: Also romanized as Garrū, Garū, and Gerow; also known as Gīrū) is a village in Kabud Gonbad Rural District of the Central District in Kalat County, Razavi Khorasan province, Iran.

== Demographics ==
=== Population ===
At the time of the 2006 National Census, the village's population was 2,083 in 440 households. The following census in 2011 counted 1,947 people in 484 households. The 2016 census measured the population of the village as 1,724 people in 509 households, the most populous in its rural district.
