= Charam-e Now =

Village in Razavi Khorasan province, Iran

Charam-e Now Persian: چرم نو
- Village
- Location within Iran
- Coordinates: 37°01′25″N 59°38′02″E
- Country: Iran
- Province: Razavi Khorasan
- County: Kalat
- District: Central
- Rural District: Charam

Population (2016)
  - Total: 154
- Time zone: UTC+3:30 (IRST)

Charam-e Now (Persian: چرم نو) (Note: Also known as Charam) is a village in Charam Rural District of the Central District in Kalat County, Razavi Khorasan province, Iran.

== Demographics ==
=== Population ===
At the time of the 2006 National Census, the village's population was 195 in 54 households, when it was in Kabud Gonbad Rural District. The following census in 2011 counted 180 people in 53 households. The 2016 census measured the population of the village as 154 people in 58 households.

In 2021, Charam-e Now was transferred to the new Charam Rural District.
