= Qaleh Zow =

Village in Razavi Khorasan province, Iran

Qaleh Zow Persian: قله زو
- Village
- Location within Iran
- Coordinates: 36°56′09″N 59°54′21″E
- Country: Iran
- Province: Razavi Khorasan
- County: Kalat
- District: Central
- Rural District: Kabud Gonbad

Population (2016)
  - Total: 899
- Time zone: UTC+3:30 (IRST)

Qaleh Zow (Persian: قله زو) (Note: Also romanized as Qaleh Zu, Qaleh Zū, Qolleh Zū, Qollehzow, and Qollahzow; also known as Qal’eh Zow and Qal‘eh Zū) is a village in Kabud Gonbad Rural District of the Central District in Kalat County, Razavi Khorasan province, Iran.

== Demographics ==
=== Population ===
At the time of the 2006 National Census, the village's population was 1,156 in 302 households. The following census in 2011 counted 978 people in 279 households. The 2016 census measured the population of the village as 899 people in 276 households.
