= Astarqan =

Astarqan استرقان
- Village
- Location within Iran
- Coordinates: 38°31′57″N 46°13′12″E
- Country: Iran
- Province: East Azerbaijan
- County: Varzaqan
- Bakhsh: Kharvana
- Rural District: Arzil

Population (2006)
  - Total: 157
- Time zone: UTC+3:30 (IRST)
  - Summer (DST): UTC+4:30 (IRDT)

Astarqan (Persian: استرقان, also Romanized as Astarqān and Āstarqān; also known as Astarabān, Astaragan, and Astarghan) is a village in Arzil Rural District, Kharvana District, Varzaqan County, East Azerbaijan Province, Iran. At the 2006 census, its population was 157, in 41 families.
