= Miveh Rud =

Miveh Rud ميوه رود
- Village
- Location within Iran
- Coordinates: 38°31′02″N 46°15′46″E
- Country: Iran
- Province: East Azerbaijan
- County: Varzaqan
- Bakhsh: Kharvana
- Rural District: Arzil

Population (2006)
  - Total: 249
- Time zone: UTC+3:30 (IRST)
  - Summer (DST): UTC+4:30 (IRDT)

Miveh Rud (Persian: ميوه رود, also Romanized as Mīveh Rūd and Miveh Rood; also known as Movārī, Muvāri, and Myuvari) is a village in Arzil Rural District, Kharvana District, Varzaqan County, East Azerbaijan Province, Iran. At the 2006 census, its population was 249, in 65 families.
