= Yarali =

Yarali may refer to:

- Yarali-ye Olya, village in Iran
- Yarali-ye Sofla, village in Iran
- Yaralı, album
- Şemsi Yaralı (b. 1982), Turkish boxer

== See also ==
- Yar Ali (disambiguation)
