= Sundakhar =

Sundakhar سونداخر
- Village
- Location within Iran
- Coordinates: 38°37′19″N 46°10′58″E
- Country: Iran
- Province: East Azerbaijan
- County: Varzaqan
- Bakhsh: Kharvana
- Rural District: Dizmar-e Markazi

Population (2006)
  - Total: 107
- Time zone: UTC+3:30 (IRST)
  - Summer (DST): UTC+4:30 (IRDT)

Sundakhar (Persian: سونداخر, also Romanized as Sūndākhar; also known as Sindākhir, Sindakhyr, Sondākhvor, Sondeh Khor, Sowndeh Khvor, Sūnd Ākhowr, Sūndākhūr, and Sūndeh Khūr) is a village in Dizmar-e Markazi Rural District, Kharvana District, Varzaqan County, East Azerbaijan Province, Iran. At the 2006 census, its population was 107, in 24 families.
