= Sohran, East Azerbaijan =

Village in East Azerbaijan, Iran

Sohran سهران
- Village
- Location within Iran
- Coordinates: 38°35′14″N 46°17′27″E
- Country: Iran
- Province: East Azerbaijan
- County: Varzaqan
- Bakhsh: Kharvana
- Rural District: Arzil

Population (2006)
  - Total: 95
- Time zone: UTC+3:30 (IRST)
  - Summer (DST): UTC+4:30 (IRDT)

Sohran (Persian: سهران, also Romanized as Sohrān; also known as Sagrān, Sagrūn, Segryun, Sohrown, and Sohrūn; in Armenian: Սյուրյուն) is a village in Arzil Rural District, Kharvana District, Varzaqan County, East Azerbaijan Province, Iran. At the 2006 census, its population was 95, in 25 families.
