= Nafteh =

Nafteh (Persian: نفطه or نفته) may refer to places in Iran:

- Nafteh, Kermanshah (نفته - Nafteh)
- Nafteh, Razavi Khorasan (نفطه - Nafţeh)
