= Khesht-e Nadari =

Village in Razavi Khorasan province, Iran

Khesht-e Nadari Persian: خشت نادري
- Village
- Location within Iran
- Coordinates: 37°01′52″N 59°46′15″E
- Country: Iran
- Province: Razavi Khorasan
- County: Kalat
- District: Central
- Rural District: Kabud Gonbad

Population (2016)
  - Total: 311
- Time zone: UTC+3:30 (IRST)

Khesht-e Nadari (Persian: خشت نادري) (Note: Also romanized as Khesht-e Nādarī; also known as Khesht) is a village in Kabud Gonbad Rural District of the Central District in Kalat County, Razavi Khorasan province, Iran.

== Demographics ==
=== Population ===
At the time of the 2006 National Census, the village's population was 455 in 114 households. The following census in 2011 counted 371 people in 111 households. The 2016 census measured the population of the village as 311 people in 105 households.
