= Amvey =

Amvey (Persian: اموي) may refer to:

- Anviq
- Avan Sar
