= Kujan, Iran =

Kujan (Persian: كوجان) may refer to:

- Kujan, Chaharmahal and Bakhtiari
- Kujan, Ahar, East Azerbaijan Province
- Kujan, Varzaqan, East Azerbaijan Province
