= Alyar =

Alyar may refer to:

- Əliyar, Azerbaijan
- Aliar (disambiguation)
