= Javanan-e Goruh =

Javanan-e Goruh جوانان گروه
- Village
- Location within Iran
- Coordinates: 38°33′59″N 46°14′09″E
- Country: Iran
- Province: East Azerbaijan
- County: Varzaqan
- Bakhsh: Kharvana
- Rural District: Arzil

Population (2006)
  - Total: 44
- Time zone: UTC+3:30 (IRST)
  - Summer (DST): UTC+4:30 (IRDT)

Javanan-e Goruh (Persian: جوانان گروه, also Romanized as Javānān-e Gorūh, Javanan Gorooh, and Javānān Gorūh; also known as Gavan Gīrūh, Gavaneh Gīrveyā, Geviana Girvia, and Gevyana-Gireya) is a village in Arzil Rural District, Kharvana District, Varzaqan County, East Azerbaijan Province, Iran. At the 2006 census, its population was 44, in 10 families.
