= Layen Rural District =

Rural district in Razavi Khorasan province, Iran

Layen Rural District Persian: دهستان لاین
- Rural District
- Location within Iran
- Coordinates: 37°04′N 59°26′E
- Country: Iran
- Province: Razavi Khorasan
- County: Kalat
- District: Hezarmasjed
- Established: 2021
- Capital: Ahmadabad
- Time zone: UTC+3:30 (IRST)

Layen Rural District (Persian: دهستان لاین) is in Hezarmasjed District of Kalat County, Razavi Khorasan province, Iran. Its capital is the village of Ahmadabad, whose population at the time of the 2016 National Census was 480 people in 141 households.

== History ==
In 2021, Hezarmasjed Rural District was separated from the Central District in the formation of Hezarmasjed District, and Layen Rural District was created in the new district.

== Other villages in the rural district ==
- Azizabad
- Baba Ramazan
- Chahar Rah
- Karimabad
- Khakestar
- Layen-e Kohneh
- Robat
- Sang Divar
- Zow-e Bala
