= Sarkesh, Varzaqan =

Sarkesh سركش
- Village
- Location within Iran
- Coordinates: 38°34′54″N 46°22′47″E
- Country: Iran
- Province: East Azerbaijan
- County: Varzaqan
- Bakhsh: Kharvana
- Rural District: Jushin

Population (2006)
  - Total: 224
- Time zone: UTC+3:30 (IRST)
  - Summer (DST): UTC+4:30 (IRDT)

Sarkesh (Persian: سركش, also Romanized as Sarkash and Serkesh; also known as Sirkash and Sīrkesh) is a village in Jushin Rural District, Kharvana District, Varzaqan County, East Azerbaijan Province, Iran. At the 2006 census, its population was 224, in 53 families.
