= Qeshlaq-e Khurasha =

Qeshlaq-e Khurasha (Persian: قشلاق خورشا) may refer to:

- Qeshlaq-e Khurasha-ye Olya
- Qeshlaq-e Khurasha-ye Sofla
