= Mashahir =

Mashahir مشاهير
- Village
- Location within Iran
- Coordinates: 38°29′52″N 46°16′57″E
- Country: Iran
- Province: East Azerbaijan
- County: Varzaqan
- Bakhsh: Kharvana
- Rural District: Arzil

Population (2006)
  - Total: 197
- Time zone: UTC+3:30 (IRST)
  - Summer (DST): UTC+4:30 (IRDT)

Mashahir (Persian: مشاهير, also Romanized as Mashāhīr; also known as Mashīr, and Mesheir) is a village in Arzil Rural District, Kharvana District, Varzaqan County, East Azerbaijan Province, Iran. At the 2006 census, its population was 197, in 53 families.
