= Gowrand =

Gowrand گوراند
- Village
- Location within Iran
- Coordinates: 38°36′49″N 46°10′31″E
- Country: Iran
- Province: East Azerbaijan
- County: Varzaqan
- Bakhsh: Kharvana
- Rural District: Dizmar-e Markazi

Population (2006)
  - Total: 137
- Time zone: UTC+3:30 (IRST)
  - Summer (DST): UTC+4:30 (IRDT)

Gowrand (Persian: گوراند, also Romanized as Gowrānd and Goorand; also known as Gerand and Kūrānd) is a village in Dizmar-e Markazi Rural District, Kharvana District, Varzaqan County, East Azerbaijan Province, Iran. At the 2006 census, its population was 137, in 37 families.
