= Charam-e Kohneh =

Village in Razavi Khorasan province, Iran

Charam-e Kohneh Persian: چرم كهنه
- Village
- Location within Iran
- Coordinates: 36°59′25″N 59°37′54″E
- Country: Iran
- Province: Razavi Khorasan
- County: Kalat
- District: Central
- Rural District: Charam

Population (2016)
  - Total: 674
- Time zone: UTC+3:30 (IRST)

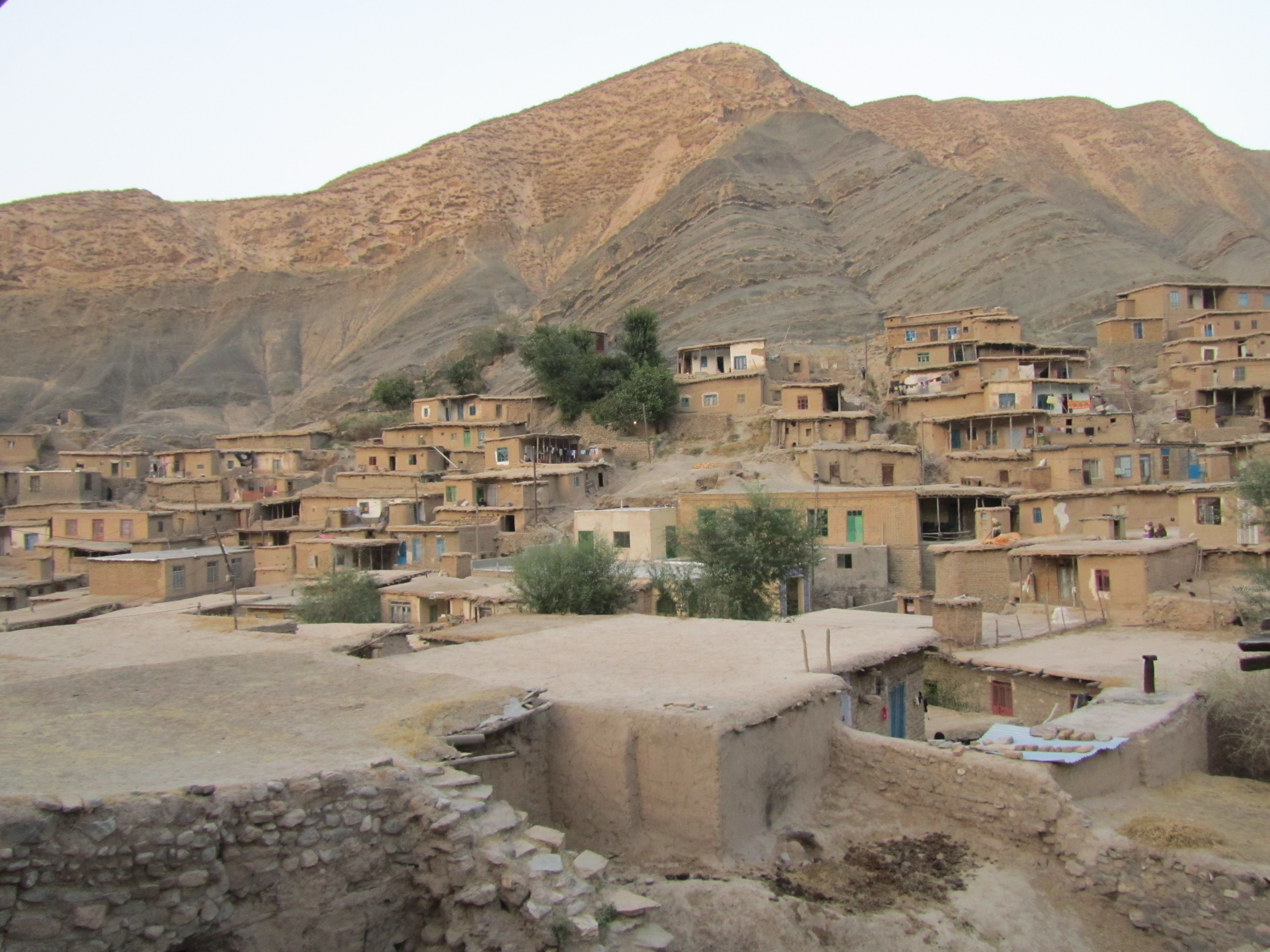
Charam village near Kalat, Razavi Khorasan Province, Iran.

Charam-e Kohneh (Persian: چرم كهنه) (Note: Also known as Charam) is a village in, and the capital of, Charam Rural District in the Central District of Kalat County, Razavi Khorasan province, Iran.

== Demographics ==
=== Population ===
At the time of the 2006 National Census, the village's population was 991 in 248 households, when it was in Kabud Gonbad Rural District. The following census in 2011 counted 804 people in 248 households. The 2016 census measured the population of the village as 674 people in 231 households.

In 2021, Charam-e Kohneh was transferred to the new Charam Rural District.
