= Sirzar, Kabud Gonbad =

Village in Razavi Khorasan province, Iran

Sirzar Persian: سيرزار
- Village
- Location within Iran
- Coordinates: 36°58′04″N 59°50′08″E
- Country: Iran
- Province: Razavi Khorasan
- County: Kalat
- District: Central
- Rural District: Kabud Gonbad

Population (2016)
  - Total: 587
- Time zone: UTC+3:30 (IRST)

Sirzar (Persian: سيرزار) (Note: Also romanized as Sīrzār; also known as Mīrzār) is a village in Kabud Gonbad Rural District of the Central District in Kalat County, Razavi Khorasan province, Iran.

== Demographics ==
=== Population ===
At the time of the 2006 National Census, the village's population was 711 in 165 households. The following census in 2011 counted 754 people in 188 households. The 2016 census measured the population of the village as 587 people in 163 households.
