= Kurakesh =

Kurakesh كوراكش
- Village
- Location within Iran
- Coordinates: 38°36′40″N 46°08′48″E
- Country: Iran
- Province: East Azerbaijan
- County: Varzaqan
- Bakhsh: Kharvana
- Rural District: Arzil

Population (2006)
  - Total: 165
- Time zone: UTC+3:30 (IRST)
  - Summer (DST): UTC+4:30 (IRDT)

Kurakesh (Persian: كوراكش, also Romanized as Kūrākesh; also known as Korakesh) is a village in Arzil Rural District, Kharvana District, Varzaqan County, East Azerbaijan Province, Iran. At the 2006 census, its population was 165, in 44 families.
