= Aqdash, Kalat =

Village in Razavi Khorasan province, Iran

Aqdash Persian: اقداش
- Village
- Location within Iran
- Coordinates: 36°55′09″N 59°58′14″E
- Country: Iran
- Province: Razavi Khorasan
- County: Kalat
- District: Central
- Rural District: Kabud Gonbad

Population (2016)
  - Total: 525
- Time zone: UTC+3:30 (IRST)

Aqdash (Persian: اقداش) (Note: Also romanized as Āqdāsh; also known as Āq Tāsh) is a village in Kabud Gonbad Rural District of the Central District in Kalat County, Razavi Khorasan province, Iran.

== Demographics ==
=== Population ===
At the time of the 2006 National Census, the village's population was 612 in 147 households. The following census in 2011 counted 623 people in 172 households. The 2016 census measured the population of the village as 525 people in 155 households.
