= Zharf, Kalat =

Village in Razavi Khorasan province, Iran

Zharf Persian: ژرف
- Village
- Location within Iran
- Coordinates: 36°54′51″N 59°40′06″E
- Country: Iran
- Province: Razavi Khorasan
- County: Kalat
- District: Central
- Rural District: Charam

Population (2016)
  - Total: 256
- Time zone: UTC+3:30 (IRST)

Zharf (Persian: ژرف) (Note: Also known as Jaraf, Jarf, and Jarif) is a village in Charam Rural District of the Central District in Kalat County, Razavi Khorasan province, Iran.

== Demographics ==
=== Population ===
At the time of the 2006 National Census, the village's population was 448 in 113 households, when it was in Kabud Gonbad Rural District. The following census in 2011 counted 231 people in 66 households. The 2016 census measured the population of the village as 256 people in 78 households.

In 2021, Zharf was transferred to the new Charam Rural District.
