= Kabud Gonbad =

Kabud Gonbad (Persian: كبودگنبد) may refer to:

- Kabud Gonbad, East Azerbaijan
- Kabud Gonbad, Tehran
- Kabud Gonbad, Zanjan
- Kabud Gonbad Rural District, in Razavi Khorasan Province
