= Nafteh, Razavi Khorasan =

Village in Razavi Khorasan province, Iran

Nafteh Persian: نفطه
- Village
- Location within Iran
- Coordinates: 37°00′13″N 59°52′03″E
- Country: Iran
- Province: Razavi Khorasan
- County: Kalat
- District: Central
- Rural District: Kabud Gonbad

Population (2016)
  - Total: 113
- Time zone: UTC+3:30 (IRST)

Nafteh (Persian: نفطه) (Note: Also romanized as Nafţeh) is a village in Kabud Gonbad Rural District of the Central District in Kalat County, Razavi Khorasan province, Iran.

== Demographics ==
=== Population ===
At the time of the 2006 National Census, the village's population was 152 in 38 households. The following census in 2011 counted 123 people in 38 households. The 2016 census measured the population of the village as 113 people in 37 households.
