= Iri, Iran =

Iri (Persian: ايري) may refer to:

- Iri-ye Olya
- Iri-ye Sofla
