= Dastjerd, Varzaqan =

Village in East Azerbaijan province, Iran

Dastjerd Persian: دستجرد
- Village
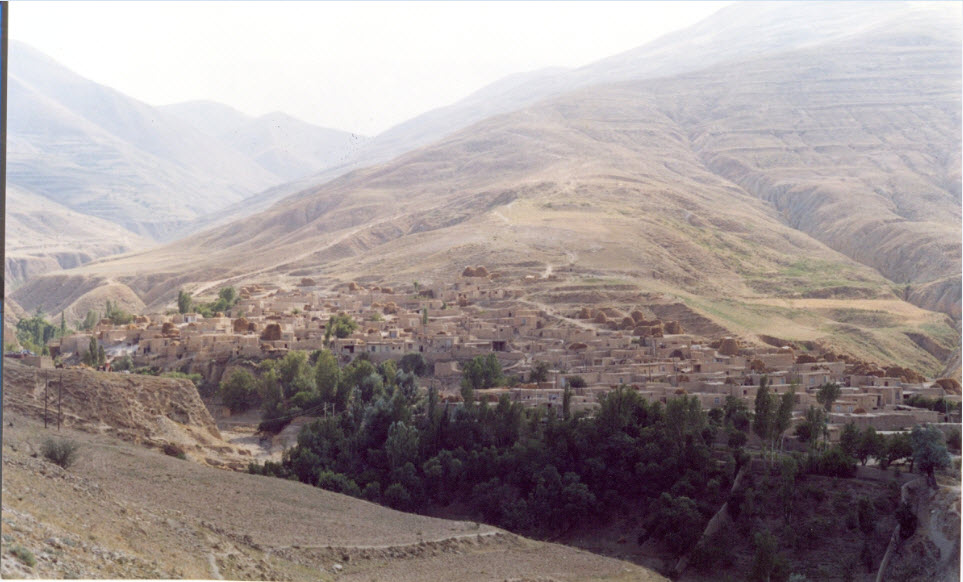
- The village of Dastjerd

- Location within Iran
- Coordinates: 38°43′28″N 46°06′39″E
- Country: Iran
- Province: East Azerbaijan
- County: Varzaqan
- District: Kharvana
- Rural District: Dizmar-e Markazi

Population (2016)
  - Total: 504
- Time zone: UTC+3:30 (IRST)

Dastjerd (Persian: دستجرد) (Note: Also known as Dostair) is a village in Dizmar-e Markazi Rural District of Kharvana District in Varzaqan County, (Note: Formerly Arsbaran County) East Azerbaijan province, Iran.

== Demographics ==
=== Population ===
At the time of the 2006 National Census, the village's population was 409 in 103 households. The following census in 2011 counted 324 people in 86 households. The 2016 census measured the population of the village as 504 people in 157 households.
