= Kabud Gonbad, East Azerbaijan =

Kabud Gonbad كبودگنبد
- Village
- Location within Iran
- Coordinates: 38°38′21″N 46°16′27″E
- Country: Iran
- Province: East Azerbaijan
- County: Varzaqan
- Bakhsh: Kharvana
- Rural District: Dizmar-e Markazi

Population (2006)
  - Total: 214
- Time zone: UTC+3:30 (IRST)
  - Summer (DST): UTC+4:30 (IRDT)

Kabud Gonbad (Persian: كبودگنبد, also Romanized as Kabūd Gonbad; also known as Keymaty, Qeshlāq-e Yūzābād, Qesmatī, Qeymati, and Qishlaq Qimati) is a village in Dizmar-e Markazi Rural District, Kharvana District, Varzaqan County, East Azerbaijan Province, Iran. At the 2006 census, its population was 214, in 45 families.
