= Suan =

Suan may refer to:

- Suan, Atlántico, Colombia
- Sivan, East Azerbaijan, a village in Iran
- Suan County, a county of North Hwanghae Province, North Korea
- Suan Station, a station of the Busan Metro, South Korea
- a minor Kazakh Zhuz ("horde"), numbering ca. 30,000
