= Astmal =

Village in East Azerbaijan province, Iran

Astmal Persian: استمال
- Village
- Location within Iran
- Coordinates: 38°43′03″N 46°25′03″E
- Country: Iran
- Province: East Azerbaijan
- County: Varzaqan
- District: Kharvana
- Rural District: Jushin

Population (2016)
  - Total: 514
- Time zone: UTC+3:30 (IRST)

Astmal (Persian: استمال) (Note: Also romanized as Āstamāl and Astmāl) is a village in Jushin Rural District of Kharvana District in Varzaqan County, (Note: Formerly Arsbaran County) East Azerbaijan province, Iran.

== Demographics ==
=== Population ===
At the time of the 2006 National Census, the village's population was 400 in 127 households. The following census in 2011 counted 363 people in 127 households. The 2016 census measured the population of the village as 514 people in 185 households.
