= Marzabad, Varzaqan =

Village in East Azerbaijan province, Iran

Marzabad Persian: مرزاباد
- Village
- Location within Iran
- Coordinates: 38°37′58″N 46°07′56″E
- Country: Iran
- Province: East Azerbaijan
- County: Varzaqan
- District: Kharvana
- Rural District: Dizmar-e Markazi

Population (2016)
  - Total: 333
- Time zone: UTC+3:30 (IRST)

Marzabad (Persian: مرزاباد) (Note: Also romanized as Marzābād and Merzabad; also known as Mirzābād, Mitzābād, and Qeshlāq-e Marzābād) is a village in Dizmar-e Markazi Rural District of Kharvana District in Varzaqan County, (Note: Formerly Arsbaran County) East Azerbaijan province, Iran.

== Demographics ==
=== Population ===
At the time of the 2006 National Census, the village's population was 165 in 41 households. The following census in 2011 counted 132 people in 36 households. The 2016 census measured the population of the village as 333 people in 116 households.
