= Tarzam =

Village in East Azerbaijan province, Iran

Tarzam Persian: طرزم
- Village
- Location within Iran
- Coordinates: 38°31′05″N 46°08′26″E
- Country: Iran
- Province: East Azerbaijan
- County: Varzaqan
- District: Kharvana
- Rural District: Arzil

Population (2016)
  - Total: 576
- Time zone: UTC+3:30 (IRST)

Tarzam (Persian: طرزم) (Note: Also romanized as Ţarzam and Ţarzom)) is a village in Arzil Rural District of Kharvana District in Varzaqan County, (Note: Formerly Arsbaran County) East Azerbaijan province, Iran.

== Demographics ==
=== Population ===
At the time of the 2006 National Census, the village's population was 816 in 184 households. The following census in 2011 counted 642 people in 175 households. The 2016 census measured the population of the village as 576 people in 191 households.
