= Lilab =

Village in East Azerbaijan province, Iran

Lilab Persian: لیلاب
- Village
- Location within Iran
- Coordinates: 38°40′10″N 46°12′43″E
- Country: Iran
- Province: East Azerbaijan
- County: Varzaqan
- District: Kharvana
- Rural District: Dizmar-e Markazi

Population (2016)
  - Total: 764
- Time zone: UTC+3:30 (IRST)

Lilab (Persian: لیلاب) (Note: Also romanized as Līlāb; also known as Līlān and Lilyan) is a village in Dizmar-e Markazi Rural District of Kharvana District in Varzaqan County, (Note: Formerly Arsbaran County) East Azerbaijan province, Iran.

== Demographics ==
=== Population ===
At the time of the 2006 National Census, the village's population was 591 in 130 households. The following census in 2011 counted 569 people in 160 households. The 2016 census measured the population of the village as 764 people in 227 households. It was the most populous village in its rural district.
