= Negarestan, East Azerbaijan =

Village in East Azerbaijan province, Iran

Negarestan Persian: نگارستان
- Village
- Location within Iran
- Coordinates: 38°33′00″N 46°22′55″E
- Country: Iran
- Province: East Azerbaijan
- County: Varzaqan
- District: Kharvana
- Rural District: Jushin

Population (2016)
  - Total: 371
- Time zone: UTC+3:30 (IRST)

Negarestan (Persian: نگارستان) (Note: Also romanized as Negārestān; also known as Nīārestān, Niaristan, and Niarkistān) is a village in Jushin Rural District of Kharvana District in Varzaqan County, (Note: Formerly Arsbaran County) East Azerbaijan province, Iran.

== Demographics ==
=== Population ===
At the time of the 2006 National Census, the village's population was 460 in 101 households. The following census in 2011 counted 358 people in 91 households. The 2016 census measured the population of the village as 371 people in 117 households.
