= Zharf =

Zharf or Jarf (Persian: ژرف) may refer to:

- Zharf, Kalat
- Zharf, Zaveh
