= Hasanabad-e Layen-e Now =

City in Razavi Khorasan province, Iran

Hasanabad-e Layen-e Now Persian: حسن اباد لائين نو
- City
- Location within Iran
- Coordinates: 37°07′41″N 59°29′56″E
- Country: Iran
- Province: Razavi Khorasan
- County: Kalat
- District: Hezarmasjed
- Established as a city: 2021

Population (2016)
  - Total: 2,872
- Time zone: UTC+3:30 (IRST)

Hasanabad-e Layen-e Now (Persian: حسن اباد لائين نو) (Note: Also romanized as Ḩasanābād-e Lāyen-e Now; also known as Ḩasanābād) is a city in, and the capital of, Hezarmasjed District in Kalat County, Razavi Khorasan province, Iran. As a village, it was the capital of Hezarmasjed Rural District until its capital was transferred to the village of Kalu.

== Demographics ==
=== Population ===
At the time of the 2006 National Census, Hasanabad-e Layen-e Now's population was 2,664 in 646 households, when it was a village in Hezarmasjed Rural District of the Central District. The following census in 2011 counted 2,940 people in 775 households. The 2016 census measured the population of the village as 2,872 people in 877 households, the most populous in its rural district.

In 2021, the rural district was separated from the district in the formation of Hezarmasjed District. Hasanabad-e Layen-e Now was converted to a city in the same year.
