= Sivan, Varzaqan =

Sivan سيوان (Persian)
- Village
- Location within Iran
- Coordinates: 38°30′10″N 46°15′58″E
- Country: Iran
- Province: East Azerbaijan
- County: Varzaqan
- Bakhsh: Kharvana
- Rural District: Arzil

Population (2006)
  - Total: 51
- Time zone: UTC+3:30 (IRST)
  - Summer (DST): UTC+4:30 (IRDT)

Sivan (Persian: سيوان, also Romanized as Sīvān; also known as Sanvan, Senavān, Sevān, Seyyedān, and Suan) is a village in Arzil Rural District, Kharvana District, Varzaqan County, East Azerbaijan Province, Iran. At the 2006 census, its population was 51, in 17 families.
