= Kujan, Varzaqan =

Kujan كوجان
- Village
- Location within Iran
- Coordinates: 38°40′08″N 46°05′46″E
- Country: Iran
- Province: East Azerbaijan
- County: Varzaqan
- Bakhsh: Kharvana
- Rural District: Dizmar-e Markazi

Population (2006)
  - Total: 54
- Time zone: UTC+3:30 (IRST)
  - Summer (DST): UTC+4:30 (IRDT)

Kujan (Persian: كوجان, also Romanized as Kūjān; also known as Koojan Dezmar, Kudzhyan, Kūjeyān, and Kujian) is a village in Dizmar-e Markazi Rural District, Kharvana District, Varzaqan County, East Azerbaijan Province, Iran. At the 2006 census, its population was 54, in 12 families.
