= Arzil =

Village in East Azerbaijan province, Iran

Arzil Persian: ارزيل
- Village
- Location within Iran
- Coordinates: 38°33′31″N 46°08′27″E
- Country: Iran
- Province: East Azerbaijan
- County: Varzaqan
- District: Kharvana
- Rural District: Arzil

Population (2016)
  - Total: 528
- Time zone: UTC+3:30 (IRST)

Arzil (Persian: ارزيل) (Note: Also romanized as Arzīl) is a village in, and the capital of, Arzil Rural District in Kharvana District of Varzaqan County, (Note: Formerly Arsbaran County) East Azerbaijan province, Iran.

== Demographics ==
=== Population ===
At the time of the 2006 National Census, the village's population was 432 in 125 households. The following census in 2011 counted 361 people in 110 households. The 2016 census measured the population of the village as 528 people in 179 households.
