= Hajjilar, East Azerbaijan =

Hajjilar حاجي لار
- Village
- Location within Iran
- Coordinates: 38°36′18″N 46°14′43″E
- Country: Iran
- Province: East Azerbaijan
- County: Varzaqan
- Bakhsh: Kharvana
- Rural District: Arzil

Population (2006)
  - Total: 86
- Time zone: UTC+3:30 (IRST)
  - Summer (DST): UTC+4:30 (IRDT)

Hajjilar (Persian: حاجي لار, also Romanized as Ḩājjīlār; also known as Aldzhilar, Aljīlar, Gheslagh Haji Lar Dizmar, Gūzī Ḩājjīlār, Ḩājīlār-e Gūney, Ḩājjīlar-e Gūnī, Ḩājjīlū, Qeshlāq-e Ḩājjīlār, Qeshlāq Ḩājelār, Qeshlāq Ḩājjīlār, Qeshlāq Kīājīlār, and Qishlāq Kiajilar) is a village in Arzil Rural District, Kharvana District, Varzaqan County, East Azerbaijan Province, Iran. At the 2006 census, its population was 86, in 20 families.
