= Galv, East Azerbaijan =

Village in East Azerbaijan province, Iran

Galv Persian: گلو
- Village
- Location within Iran
- Country: Iran
- Province: East Azerbaijan
- County: Varzaqan
- District: Kharvana
- Rural District: Jushin

Population (2016)
  - Total: 327
- Time zone: UTC+3:30 (IRST)

Galv (Persian: گلو) is a village in Jushin Rural District of Kharvana District in Varzaqan County, (Note: Formerly Arsbaran County) East Azerbaijan province, Iran.

== Demographics ==
=== Population ===
At the time of the 2006 National Census, the village's population was 380 in 76 households. The following census in 2011 counted 242 people in 55 households. The 2016 census measured the population of the village as 327 people in 132 households.
