= Qeshlaq-e Hajjilar, Varzaqan =

Qeshlaq-e Hajjilar قشلاق حاجيلار
- Village
- Location within Iran
- Coordinates: 38°36′00″N 46°15′00″E
- Country: Iran
- Province: East Azerbaijan
- County: Varzaqan
- Bakhsh: Kharvana
- Rural District: Arzil

Population (2006)
  - Total: 27
- Time zone: UTC+3:30 (IRST)
  - Summer (DST): UTC+4:30 (IRDT)

Qeshlaq-e Hajjilar (Persian: قشلاق حاجيلار, also Romanized as Qeshlāq-e Ḩājjīlār) is a village in Arzil Rural District, Kharvana District, Varzaqan County, East Azerbaijan Province, Iran. At the 2006 census, its population was 27, in 7 families.
