= Qeshlaq-e Khurasha-ye Sofla =

Qeshlaq-e Khurasha-ye Sofla قشلاق خورشاسفلي
- Village
- Location within Iran
- Coordinates: 38°45′00″N 46°20′00″E
- Country: Iran
- Province: East Azerbaijan
- County: Varzaqan
- Bakhsh: Kharvana
- Rural District: Dizmar-e Markazi

Population (2006)
  - Total: 28
- Time zone: UTC+3:30 (IRST)
  - Summer (DST): UTC+4:30 (IRDT)

Qeshlaq-e Khurasha-ye Sofla (Persian: قشلاق خورشاسفلي, also Romanized as Qeshlāq-e Khūrāshā-ye Soflá; also known as Qeshlāq-e Khūrāshā) is a village in Dizmar-e Markazi Rural District, Kharvana District, Varzaqan County, East Azerbaijan Province, Iran. At the 2006 census, its population was 28, in 6 families.
