= Andergan =

Village in East Azerbaijan province, Iran

Andergan Persian: اندرگان
- Village
- Location within Iran
- Coordinates: 38°33′16″N 46°17′19″E
- Country: Iran
- Province: East Azerbaijan
- County: Varzaqan
- District: Kharvana
- Rural District: Arzil

Population (2016)
  - Total: 1,162
- Time zone: UTC+3:30 (IRST)

Andergan (Persian: اندرگان) (Note: Also romanized as Andargān and Āndergān; also known as Andarbān, Anderjāf, Anderyān, Ānderyān, Andīrjān, and Andyrdzhan) is a village in Arzil Rural District of Kharvana District in Varzaqan County, (Note: Formerly Arsbaran County) East Azerbaijan province, Iran.

== Demographics ==
=== Population ===
At the time of the 2006 National Census, the village's population was 911 in 228 households. The following census in 2011 counted 1,062 people in 270 households. The 2016 census measured the population of the village as 1,162 people in 321 households. It was the most populous village in its rural district.

The village is 101 km northeast of the provincial capital, Tabriz. People are primarily engaged in farming; however, the village is also famous for the Andergan (Andaryan) gold mine in its vicinity.
