= Koohsangi =

Persian Park

Coordinates: 36°16′46″N 59°33′33″E

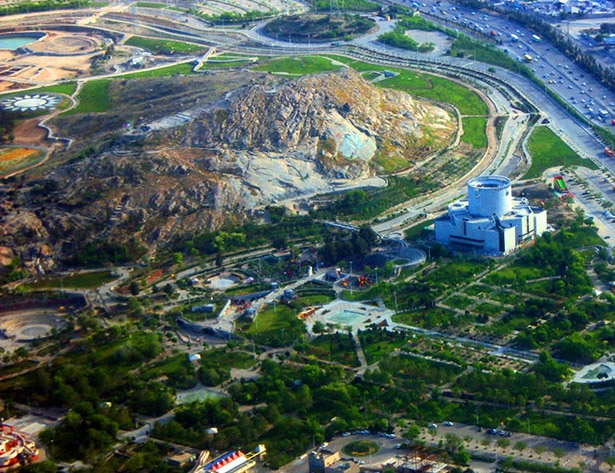
Koohsangi Park

Koohsangi is a park in Mashhad, Iran, and the second largest recreational, scientific, and park complex (after Mellat Park of Mashhad).

In 1961, with the expansion of Mashhad, Koohsangi was connected to Foozia Street and the main body of Mashhad city through a wide and wooded street called Koohsangi Street. For many years, this street was one of the best streets in Iran and its extension continued to the Mashhad railway station. Also, this place was connected to Mashhad railway station by Line 2 of Mashhad Urban Railway.

Since Mashhad was the capital of Nader Afshar, the materials of his tomb were selected from hard granite stones of Koohsangi. The building of Great Krason Museum, based on the architecture of Kalat Nader Palace, has given a beautiful effect to this collection. This museum was designed by Dariush Mirfendereski in 1977, but with the occurrence of the Islamic Revolution, its construction was postponed until 2014.

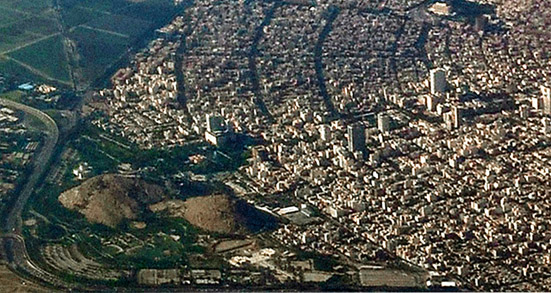
Koohsangi mountain, Khorasan museum, Khayyam Hyatt hotel, Kakh garden, and ...

On top of the peak of this mountain, there was a symbol of the Pahlavi Crown. Also, two human statues were installed next to the pool and in front of the restaurant and the hall of Koohsangi. After the Islamic revolution, because they were naked, with the crown symbol of Pahlavi, they were dismantled.

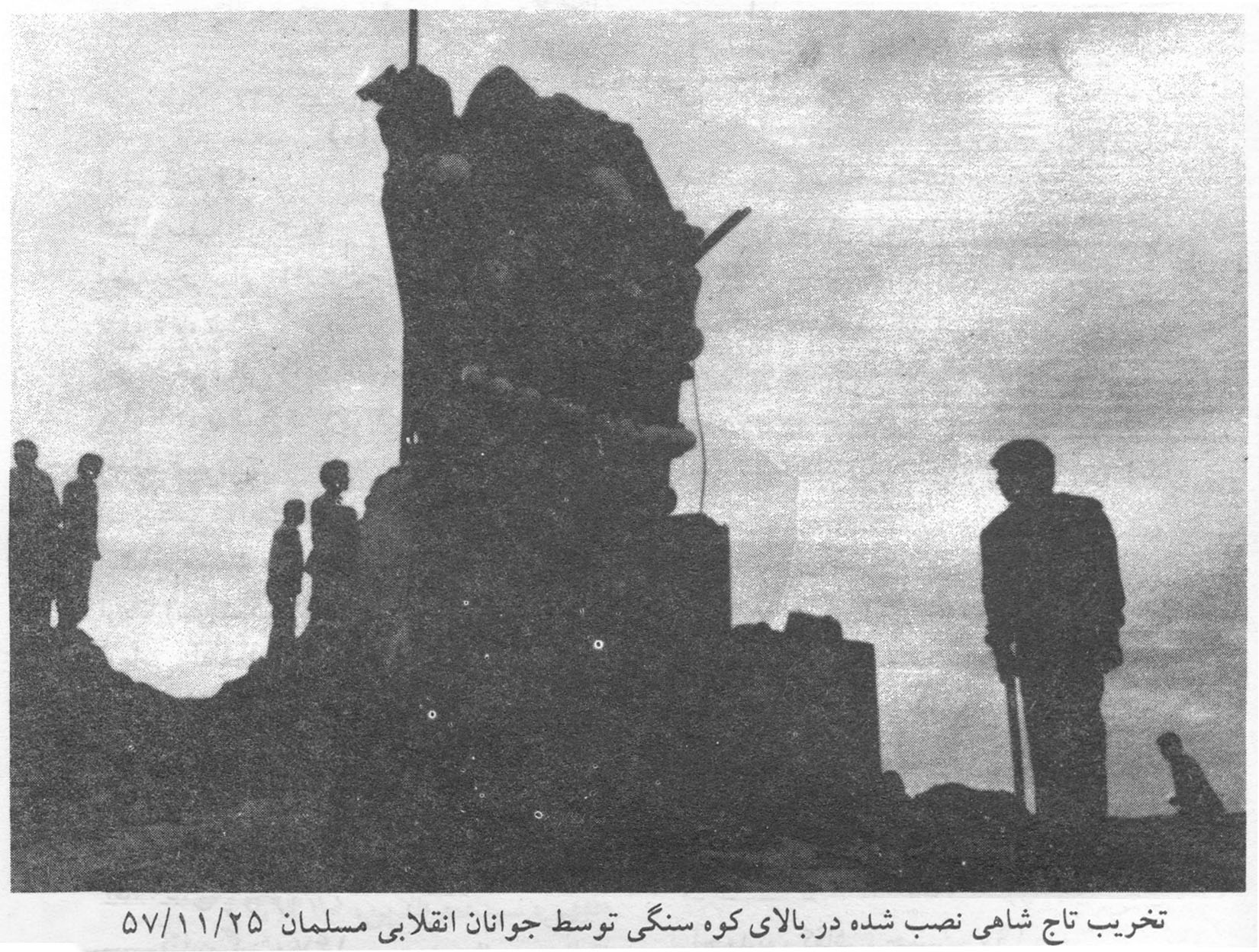
Destruction of Pahlavi crown of Koohsangi at 1979 Revolution.

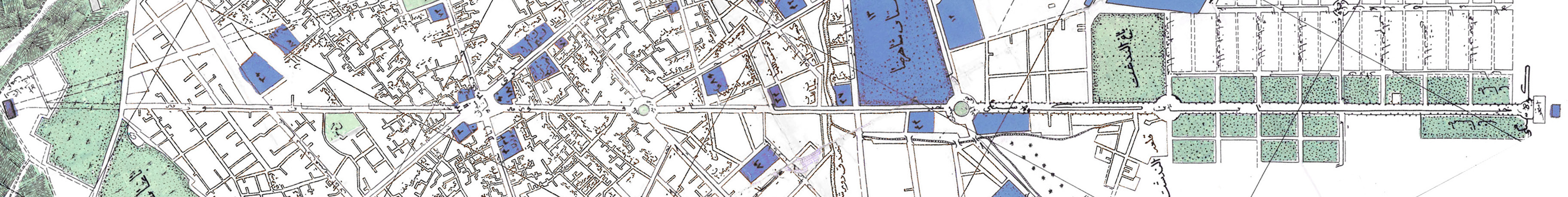
The route between Koohsangi and Railway Station (former Fooziye St.)
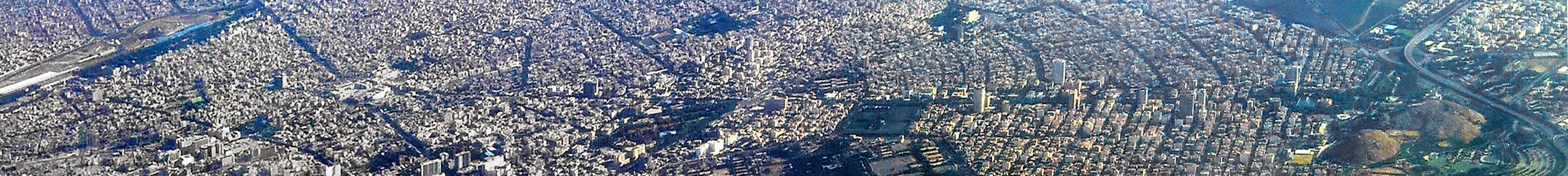

The first zoo of Mashhad was established on the western side of the rock, which was evacuated after the revolution, and now a tower has been built in its place.
