= Malek Qozat =

Village in East Azerbaijan province, Iran

Malek Qozat Persian: ملك قضات
- Village
- Location within Iran
- Coordinates: 38°41′29″N 46°08′02″E
- Country: Iran
- Province: East Azerbaijan
- County: Varzaqan
- District: Kharvana
- Rural District: Dizmar-e Markazi

Population (2016)
  - Total: 479
- Time zone: UTC+3:30 (IRST)

Malek Qozat (Persian: ملك قضات) (Note: Also romanized as Malek Qozāt, Malek Qoẕāt, Malek Qozzāt, and Molk-e Qoẕāt; also known as Malek Ghozat, Molk, Mulk, and Myul’k) is a village in Dizmar-e Markazi Rural District of Kharvana District in Varzaqan County, (Note: Formerly Arsbaran County) East Azerbaijan province, Iran.

== Demographics ==
=== Population ===
At the time of the 2006 National Census, the village's population was 169 in 42 households. The following census in 2011 counted 127 people in 36 households. The 2016 census measured the population of the village as 479 people in 143 households.
