= Avan Sar =

Avan Sar اوانسر
- Village
- Location within Iran
- Coordinates: 38°41′45″N 46°26′25″E
- Country: Iran
- Province: East Azerbaijan
- County: Varzaqan
- Bakhsh: Kharvana
- Rural District: Jushin

Population (2006)
  - Total: 28
- Time zone: UTC+3:30 (IRST)
  - Summer (DST): UTC+4:30 (IRDT)

Avan Sar (Persian: اوانسر, also Romanized as Āvān Sar; also known as Amvey) is a village in Jushin Rural District, Kharvana District, Varzaqan County, East Azerbaijan Province, Iran. At the 2006 census, its population was 28, in 6 families.
