= Yar Ali =

Yar Ali (Persian: يارعلي) may refer to:

- Yar Ali, Lorestan
- Yar Ali, West Azerbaijan

== See also ==
- Yarali (disambiguation)
- Ali Yar (disambiguation)
