= Yengejeh, Varzaqan =

Village in East Azerbaijan province, Iran

Yengejeh Persian: ينگجه
- Village
- Location within Iran
- Coordinates: 38°33′20″N 46°21′00″E
- Country: Iran
- Province: East Azerbaijan
- County: Varzaqan
- District: Kharvana
- Rural District: Jushin

Population (2016)
  - Total: 364
- Time zone: UTC+3:30 (IRST)

Yengejeh (Persian: ينگجه) (Note: Also known as Engīja, Yengejeh Dezmar, and Yengidzha) is a village in Jushin Rural District of Kharvana District in Varzaqan County, (Note: Formerly Arsbaran County) East Azerbaijan province, Iran.

== Demographics ==
=== Population ===
At the time of the 2006 National Census, the village's population was 539 in 122 households. The following census in 2011 counted 408 people in 116 households. The 2016 census measured the population of the village as 364 people in 115 households.
