= Seqay =

Village in East Azerbaijan province, Iran

Seqay Persian: سقاي
- Village
- Location within Iran
- Coordinates: 38°32′51″N 46°21′36″E
- Country: Iran
- Province: East Azerbaijan
- County: Varzaqan
- District: Kharvana
- Rural District: Jushin

Population (2016)
  - Total: 722
- Time zone: UTC+3:30 (IRST)

Seqay (Persian: سقاي) (Note: Also romanized as Saqāy and Seqāy; also known as Saghay, Sirgai, and Sygay) is a village in Jushin Rural District of Kharvana District in Varzaqan County, (Note: Formerly Arsbaran County) East Azerbaijan province, Iran.

== Demographics ==
=== Population ===
At the time of the 2006 National Census, the village's population was 869 in 187 households. The following census in 2011 counted 775 people in 185 households. The 2016 census measured the population of the village as 722 people in 222 households. It was the most populous village in its rural district.
