= Golakhor =

Village in East Azerbaijan province, Iran

Golakhor Persian: گل اخور
- Village
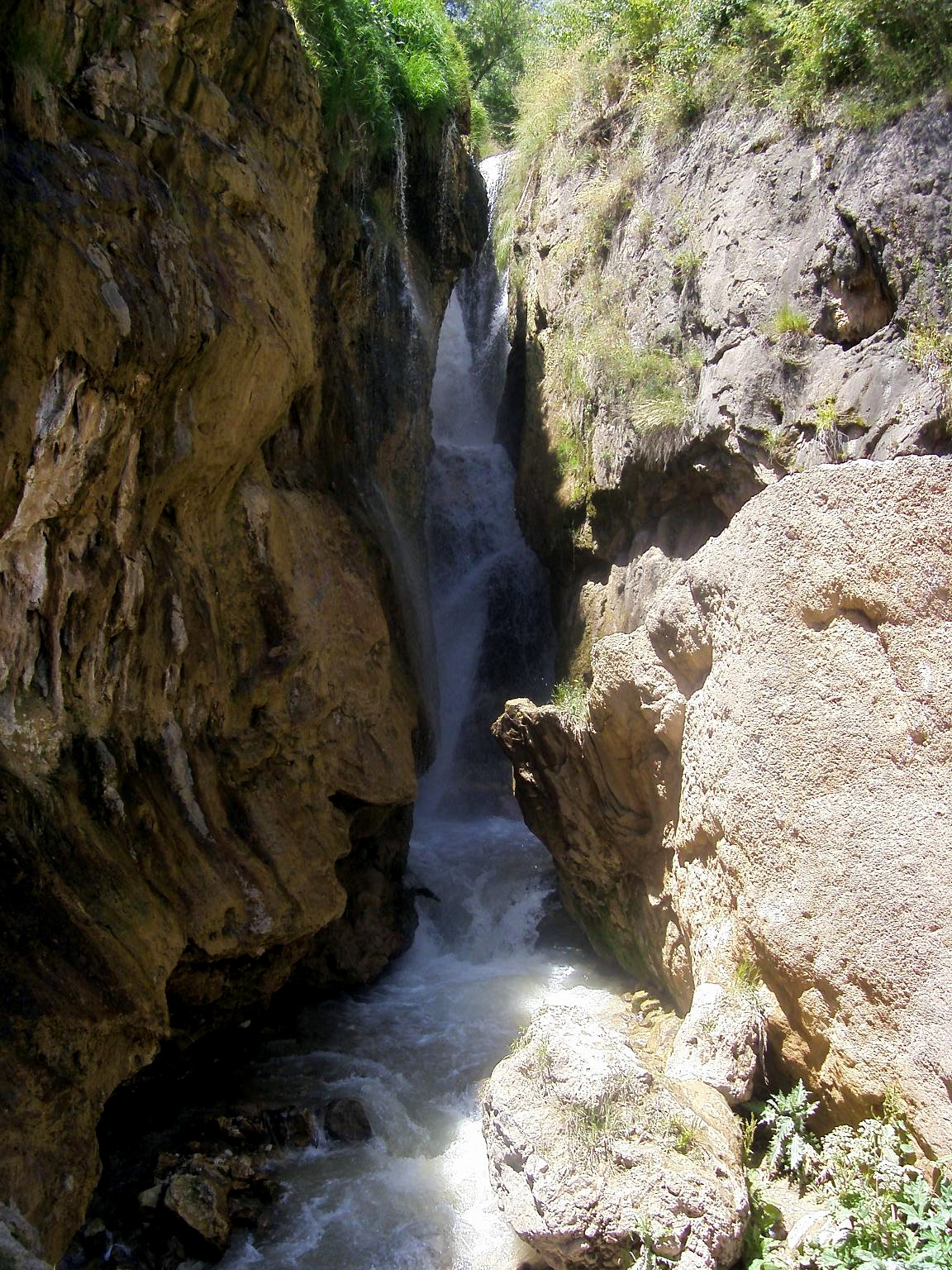
- Waterfall in Golakhor

- Location within Iran
- Coordinates: 38°33′41″N 46°07′26″E
- Country: Iran
- Province: East Azerbaijan
- County: Varzaqan
- District: Kharvana
- Rural District: Arzil

Population (2016)
  - Total: 373
- Time zone: UTC+3:30 (IRST)

Golakhor (Persian: گل اخور) (Note: Also romanized as Golakhvor, Golākhvor and Golākhūr; also known as Kūrah Khīl, Kūrehl, Kuriagil, and Kyuryagil’) is a village in Arzil Rural District of Kharvana District in Varzaqan County, (Note: Formerly Arsbaran County) East Azerbaijan province, Iran.

== Demographics ==
=== Population ===
At the time of the 2006 National Census, the village's population was 420 in 103 households. The following census in 2011 counted 375 people in 107 households. The 2016 census measured the population of the village as 373 people in 131 households.
