= Nechaq =

Village in East Azerbaijan province, Iran

Nechaq Persian: نچق
- Village
- Location within Iran
- Coordinates: 38°39′01″N 46°11′56″E
- Country: Iran
- Province: East Azerbaijan
- County: Varzaqan
- District: Kharvana
- Rural District: Dizmar-e Markazi

Population (2016)
  - Total: 398
- Time zone: UTC+3:30 (IRST)

Nechaq (Persian: نچق) (Note: Also romanized as Nacheq; also known as Nachagh, Najāq, Nehchaq, and Nicha) is a village in Dizmar-e Markazi Rural District of Kharvana District in Varzaqan County, (Note: Formerly Arsbaran County) East Azerbaijan province, Iran.

== Demographics ==
=== Population ===
At the time of the 2006 National Census, the village's population was 339 in 80 households. The following census in 2011 counted 339 people in 81 households. The 2016 census measured the population of the village as 398 people in 115 households.
