= Iri-ye Olya =

Village in East Azerbaijan province, Iran

Iri-ye Olya Persian: ايري عليا
- Village
- Location within Iran
- Coordinates: 38°30′18″N 46°11′36″E
- Country: Iran
- Province: East Azerbaijan
- County: Varzaqan
- District: Kharvana
- Rural District: Arzil

Population (2016)
  - Total: 670
- Time zone: UTC+3:30 (IRST)

Iri-ye Olya (Persian: ايري عليا) (Note: Also romanized as Iri Olya, Īrī-e ‘Olyā, Īrī-ye ‘Olyā, and Īry-e-’Olyā; also known as Iri, Īrī-e Bālā, and Īrī-ye Bālā) is a village in Arzil Rural District of Kharvana District in Varzaqan County, (Note: Formerly Arsbaran County) East Azerbaijan province, Iran.

== Demographics ==
=== Population ===
At the time of the 2006 National Census, the village's population was 635 in 148 households. The following census in 2011 counted 559 people in 176 households. The 2016 census measured the population of the village as 670 people in 231 households.
