= Kalat, Razavi Khorasan =

City in Razavi Khorasan Province, Iran

Kalat Persian: كلات
- City
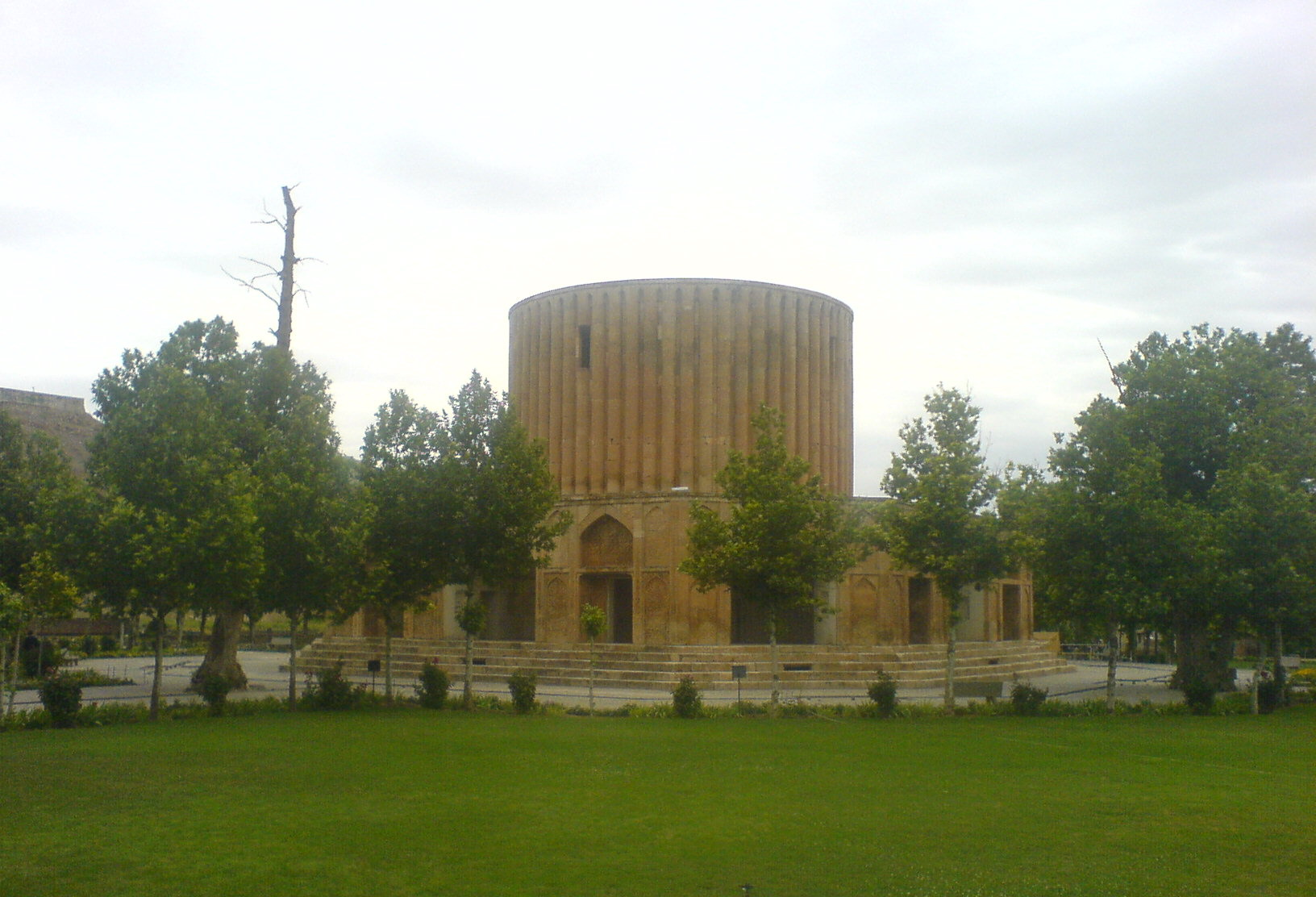
- Sun Palace of the Afsharid dynasty

- Location within Iran
- Coordinates: 36°59′42″N 59°45′46″E
- Country: Iran
- Province: Razavi Khorasan
- County: Kalat
- District: Central

Population (2016)
  - Total: 7,687
- Time zone: [[UTC+3:30 \]] (IRST)

Kalat (Persian: كلات) (Note: Also romanized as Kalāt; also known as Kalūt) is a city in the Central District of Kalat County, Razavi Khorasan province, Iran, serving as capital of both the county and the district. Nader Shah governed the area after the fall of the Safavids.

== Demographics ==
=== Population ===
At the time of the 2006 National Census, the city's population was 6,529 in 1,661 households. The following census in 2011 counted 7,532 people in 1,933 households. The 2016 census measured the population of the city as 7,687 people in 2,110 households.

=== Ethnicity ===
Around half of the people of Kalat County are Turkic peoples of Azeri origin,Tekke Turkmen; 35% are Kurdish and 15% are Persian.

== See also ==
- Kalat-i-nadiri, a massive natural fortress
- Reza Qoli Mirza Afshar
