= Anviq =

Village in East Azerbaijan province, Iran

Anviq Persian: انويق
- Village
- Location within Iran
- Coordinates: 38°41′14″N 46°29′12″E
- Country: Iran
- Province: East Azerbaijan
- County: Varzaqan
- District: Kharvana
- Rural District: Jushin

Population (2016)
  - Total: 272
- Time zone: UTC+3:30 (IRST)

Anviq (Persian: انويق) (Note: Also romanized as Anavīq and Anvīq; also known as Amvei and Amvey) is a village in Jushin Rural District of Kharvana District in Varzaqan County, (Note: Formerly Arsbaran County) East Azerbaijan province, Iran.

== Demographics ==
=== Population ===
At the time of the 2006 National Census, the village's population was 68 in 16 households. The following census in 2011 counted 87 people in 25 households. The 2016 census measured the population of the village as 272 people in 85 households.
