= Jushin, East Azerbaijan =

Village in East Azerbaijan province, Iran

Jushin Persian: جوشين
- Village
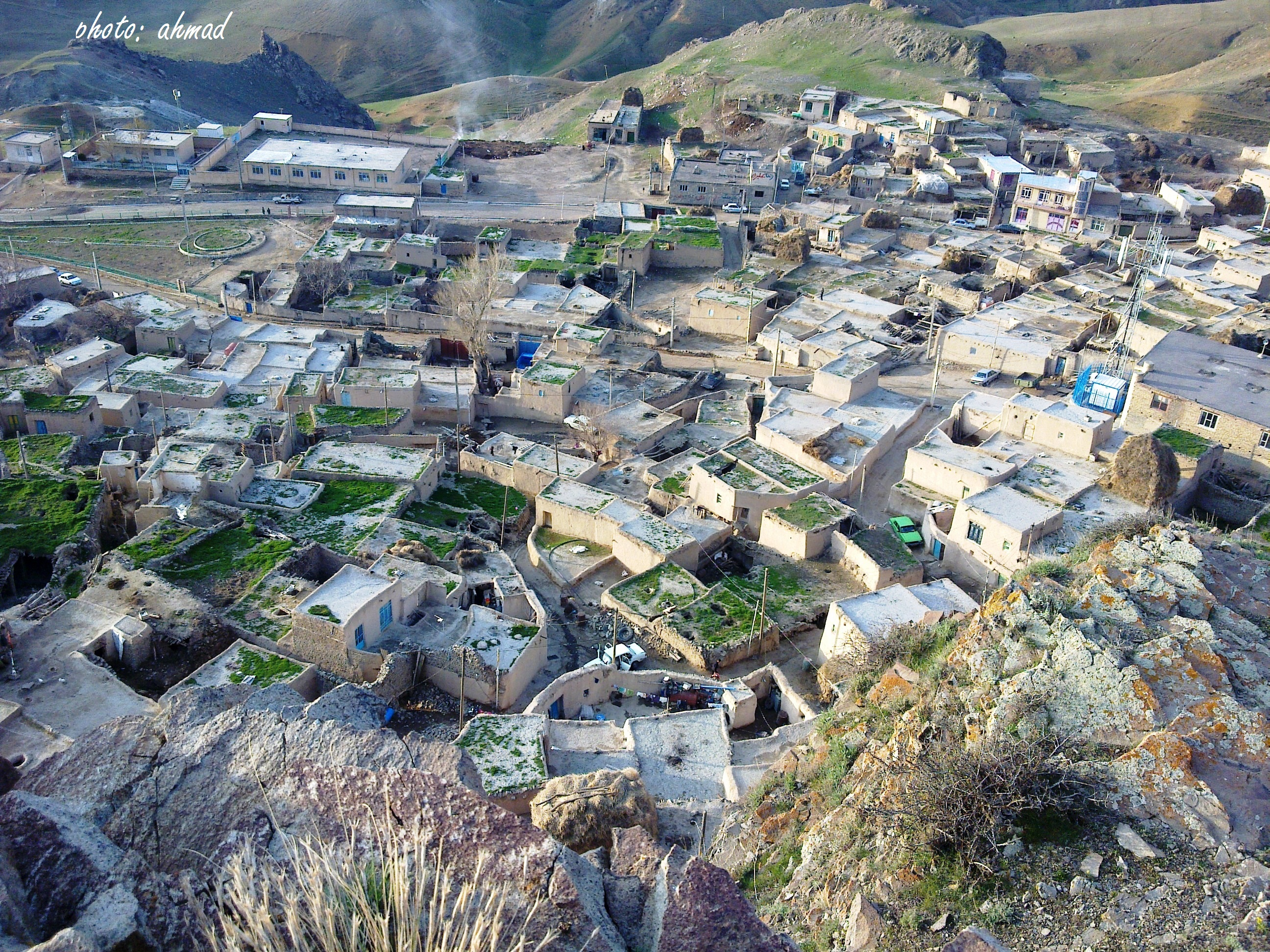
- The village of Jushin

- Location within Iran
- Coordinates: 38°37′12″N 46°22′40″E
- Country: Iran
- Province: East Azerbaijan
- County: Varzaqan
- District: Kharvana
- Rural District: Jushin

Population (2016)
  - Total: 382
- Time zone: UTC+3:30 (IRST)

Jushin (Persian: جوشين) (Note: Also romanized as Jooshin, Jowshīn, and Jūshīn; also known as Dzheshun, Joshīn, Joshun, and Jowshūn) is a village in, and the capital of, Jushin Rural District in Kharvana District of Varzaqan County, (Note: Formerly Arsbaran County) East Azerbaijan province, Iran.

== Demographics ==
=== Population ===
At the time of the 2006 National Census, the village's population was 499 in 122 households. The following census in 2011 counted 523 people in 111 households. The 2016 census measured the population of the village as 382 people in 122 households.
