= Kharvana =

City in East Azerbaijan province, Iran

Kharvana Persian: خاروانا
- City
- Location within Iran
- Coordinates: 38°41′16″N 46°10′12″E
- Country: Iran
- Province: East Azerbaijan
- County: Varzaqan
- District: Kharvana

Population (2016)
  - Total: 3,353
- Time zone: UTC+3:30 (IRST)

Kharvana (Persian: خاروانا) (Note: Also romanized as Kharvāna; formerly known as, Kharvanaq) is a city in, and the capital of, Kharvana District in Varzaqan County, (Note: Formerly Arsbaran County) East Azerbaijan province, Iran, and also serves as the administrative center for Dizmar-e Markazi Rural District.

== Demographics ==
=== Population ===
At the time of the 2006 National Census, the city's population was 1,642 in 415 households. The following census in 2011 counted 1,373 people in 316 households. The 2016 census measured the population of the city as 3,353 people in 1,035 households.
