= Sir Zar, Zavin =

Sir Zar سيرزار
- Village
- Location within Iran
- Coordinates: 36°26′06″N 60°13′36″E
- Country: Iran
- Province: Razavi Khorasan
- County: Kalat
- Bakhsh: Zavin
- Rural District: Pasakuh

Population (2006)
  - Total: 57
- Time zone: UTC+3:30 (IRST)
  - Summer (DST): UTC+4:30 (IRDT)

Sir Zar (Persian: سيرزار, also Romanized as Sīr Zār; also known as Sirza) is a village in Pasakuh Rural District, Zavin District, Kalat County, Razavi Khorasan Province, Iran. At the 2006 census, its population was 57, in 12 families.
