= Charam Rural District (Kalat County) =

Rural district in Razavi Khorasan province, Iran

Charam Rural District Persian: دهستان چرم
- Rural District
- Location within Iran
- Coordinates: 37°00′N 59°36′E
- Country: Iran
- Province: Razavi Khorasan
- County: Kalat
- District: Central
- Established: 2021
- Capital: Charam-e Kohneh
- Time zone: UTC+3:30 (IRST)

Charam Rural District (Persian: دهستان چرم) is in the Central District of Kalat County, Razavi Khorasan province, Iran. Its capital is the village of Charam-e Kohneh, whose population at the time of the 2016 National Census was 674 in 231 households.

== History ==
Charam Rural District was created in the Central District in 2021.

== Other villages in the rural district ==
- Archangan
- Charam-e Now
- Hammam Qaleh
- Hesar-e Hajji Esmail
- Idah Lik
- Qabakh
- Qarah Su
- Sini
- Sini-ye Now
- Soltanabad
- Zharf
