= Aliar =

Aliar (Persian: عليار) may refer to:

- Aliar, East Azerbaijan
- Aliar, West Azerbaijan

== See also ==
- Ali Yar (disambiguation)
