= Sirzar, Lorestan =

Sirzar سيرزار
- Village
- Location within Iran
- Coordinates: 33°13′43″N 49°03′52″E
- Country: Iran
- Province: Lorestan
- County: Aligudarz
- Bakhsh: Zaz and Mahru
- Rural District: Zaz-e Sharqi

Population (2006)
  - Total: 69
- Time zone: UTC+3:30 (IRST)
  - Summer (DST): UTC+4:30 (IRDT)

Sirzar (Persian: سيرزار, also Romanized as Sīrzār and Sīreh Zār) is a village in Zaz-e Sharqi Rural District, Zaz and Mahru District, Aligudarz County, Lorestan Province, Iran. At the 2006 census, its population was 69, in 14 families.
