= Kujan, Ahar =

Kujan كوجان
- Village
- Location within Iran
- Coordinates: 38°48′31″N 47°23′59″E
- Country: Iran
- Province: East Azerbaijan
- County: Ahar
- Bakhsh: Hurand
- Rural District: Dodangeh

Population (2006)
  - Total: 23
- Time zone: UTC+3:30 (IRST)
  - Summer (DST): UTC+4:30 (IRDT)

Kujan (Persian: كوجان, also Romanized as Kūjān; also known as Kūhjān) is a village in Dodangeh Rural District, Hurand District, Ahar County, East Azerbaijan Province, Iran. At the 2006 census, its population was 23, in 4 families.
