= Ali Yar, West Azerbaijan =

Ali Yar عليار
- Village
- Location within Iran
- Coordinates: 39°06′42″N 44°43′55″E
- Country: Iran
- Province: West Azerbaijan
- County: Showt
- Bakhsh: Central
- Rural District: Qarah Quyun-e Shomali

Population (2006)
  - Total: 23
- Time zone: UTC+3:30 (IRST)
  - Summer (DST): UTC+4:30 (IRDT)

Ali Yar (Persian: عليار, also Romanized as ‘Alī Yār; also known as ‘Alī Yārā) is a village in Qarah Quyun-e Shomali Rural District, in the Central District of Showt County, West Azerbaijan Province, Iran. At the 2006 census, its population was 23, in 6 families.
