= Gushin =

Gushin گوشين
- Village
- Location within Iran
- Coordinates: 31°40′20″N 59°58′03″E
- Country: Iran
- Province: South Khorasan
- County: Nehbandan
- Bakhsh: Central
- Rural District: Neh

Population (2006)
  - Total: 54
- Time zone: UTC+3:30 (IRST)
  - Summer (DST): UTC+4:30 (IRDT)

Gushin (Persian: گوشين, also Romanized as Gūshīn and Jūshīn) is a village in Neh Rural District, in the Central District of Nehbandan County, South Khorasan Province, Iran. At the 2006 census, its population was 54, in 17 families.
