= Yarali-ye Olya =

Yarali-ye Olya يارعلي عليا
- Village
- Location within Iran
- Coordinates: 34°10′18″N 47°58′24″E
- Country: Iran
- Province: Lorestan
- County: Delfan
- Bakhsh: Central
- Rural District: Nurali

Population (2006)
  - Total: 44
- Time zone: UTC+3:30 (IRST)
  - Summer (DST): UTC+4:30 (IRDT)

Yarali-ye Olya (Persian: يارعلي عليا, also Romanized as Yār‘alī-ye ‘Olyā; also known as Yār‘alī-ye Bālā) is a village in Nurali Rural District, in the Central District of Delfan County, Lorestan Province, Iran. At the 2006 census, its population was 44, in 8 families.
