= Əliyar =

- Municipality
- Location within Azerbaijan Location within Shaki-Zagatala Economic Region
- Coordinates: 41°00′14″N 47°15′06″E
- Country: Azerbaijan
- Rayon: Shaki

Population
  - Total: 549
- Time zone: UTC+4 (AZT)
  - Summer (DST): UTC+5 (AZT)

Əliyar (also, Alyar) is a village and municipality in the Shaki Rayon of Azerbaijan. It has a population of 549.
