= Sun Palace =

18th-century palace in Iran

Coordinates: 36.9951°N 59.7669°E

Nader Palace
- کاخ نادر
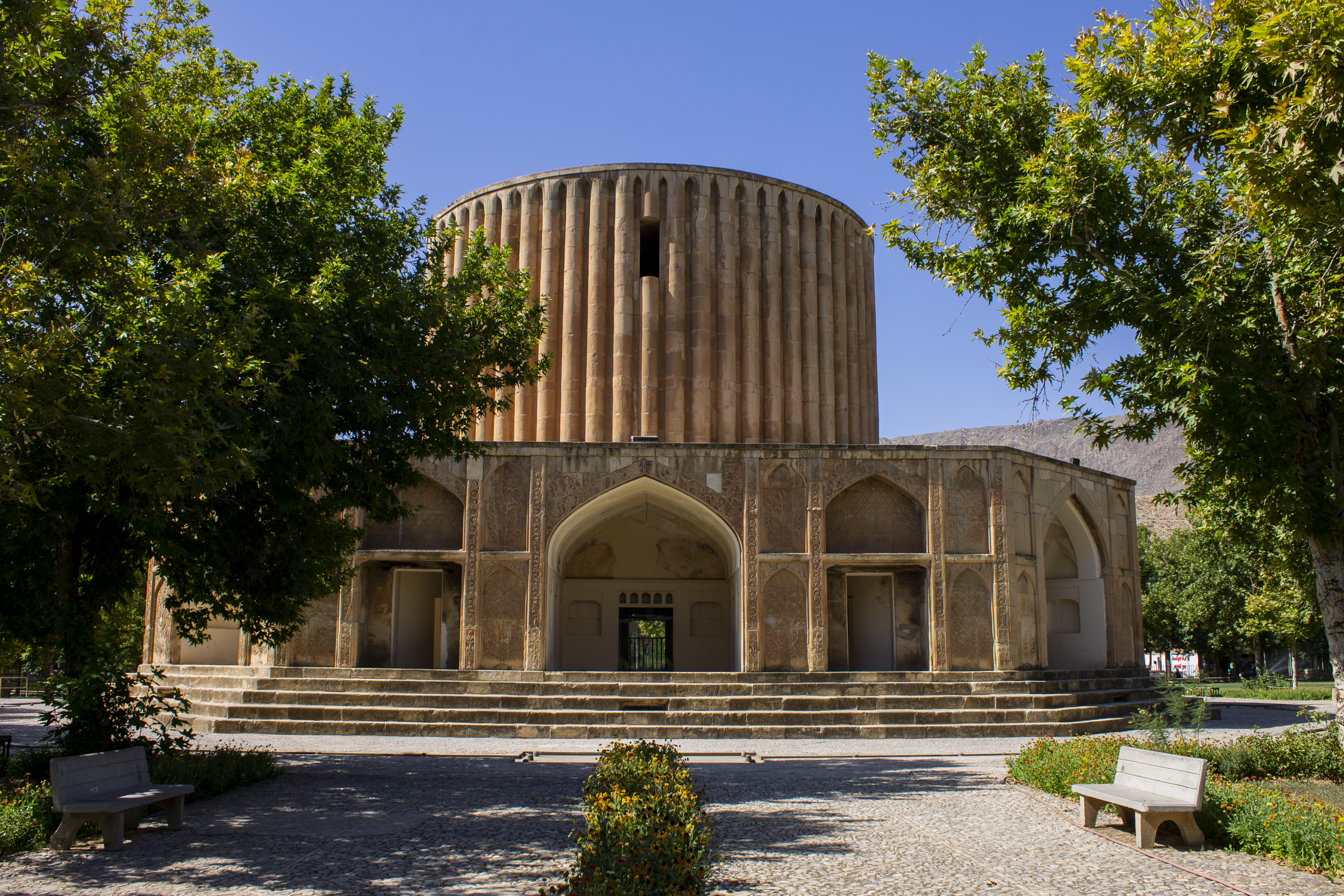
- Alternative names: Kalat Palace, Nader's Palace

General information
- Location: Kalat, Razavi Khorasan province, Iran

Iran National Heritage List
- Official name: Palace of Nader
- Type: Palace
- Designated: 1940
- Reference no.: 329
- Conservation organization: Cultural Heritage, Handicrafts and Tourism Organization of Iran

The Nader Palace (Persian: کاخ نادر), also the Kalat Palace (Persian: کاخ کلات) or the Sun Palace (Persian: کاخ خورشید), is a palace in Kalat, Iran. Built in 1738–1739, it is one of the few buildings that were built during the reign of Nader Shah. Its construction was cut short after his assassination.

It is currently used as a museum of anthropology.

== History ==
Returning from his Indian campaign, Nader Shah brought with him captive Indian architects and engineers and ordered them to construct a palace in Kalat. The palace was meant to house the Shah's treasury, and the jewels he had taken from India. The namesake of the palace was apparently a wife of Nader, who was named "Khorshid", meaning "Sun". After Nader's demise the construction process was halted, which is clearly visible from the state of the building and the calligraphies and paintings.

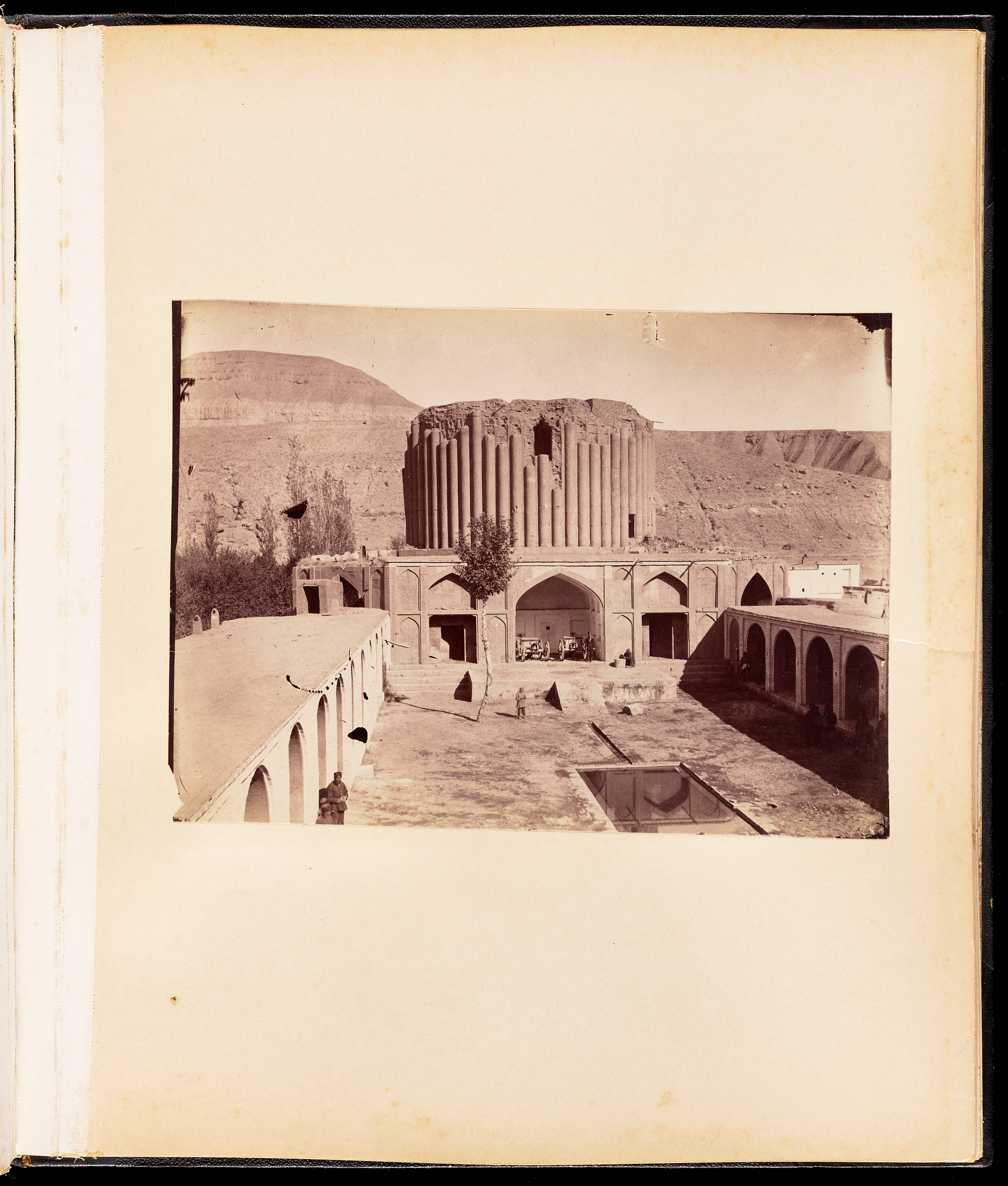
Photograph by Abdollah Mirza Qajar, 1894

Located in the middle of a large garden, it used to be 25 meters tall in 3 floors, but the third floor was ruined over time and the current height of the building does not exceed 20 meters.

There is evidence that the place was used as a residential headquarter in the early Qajar era.

It was listed in the Iranian national heritage sites list on 10 February 1940 with the number 329.

== Gallery ==
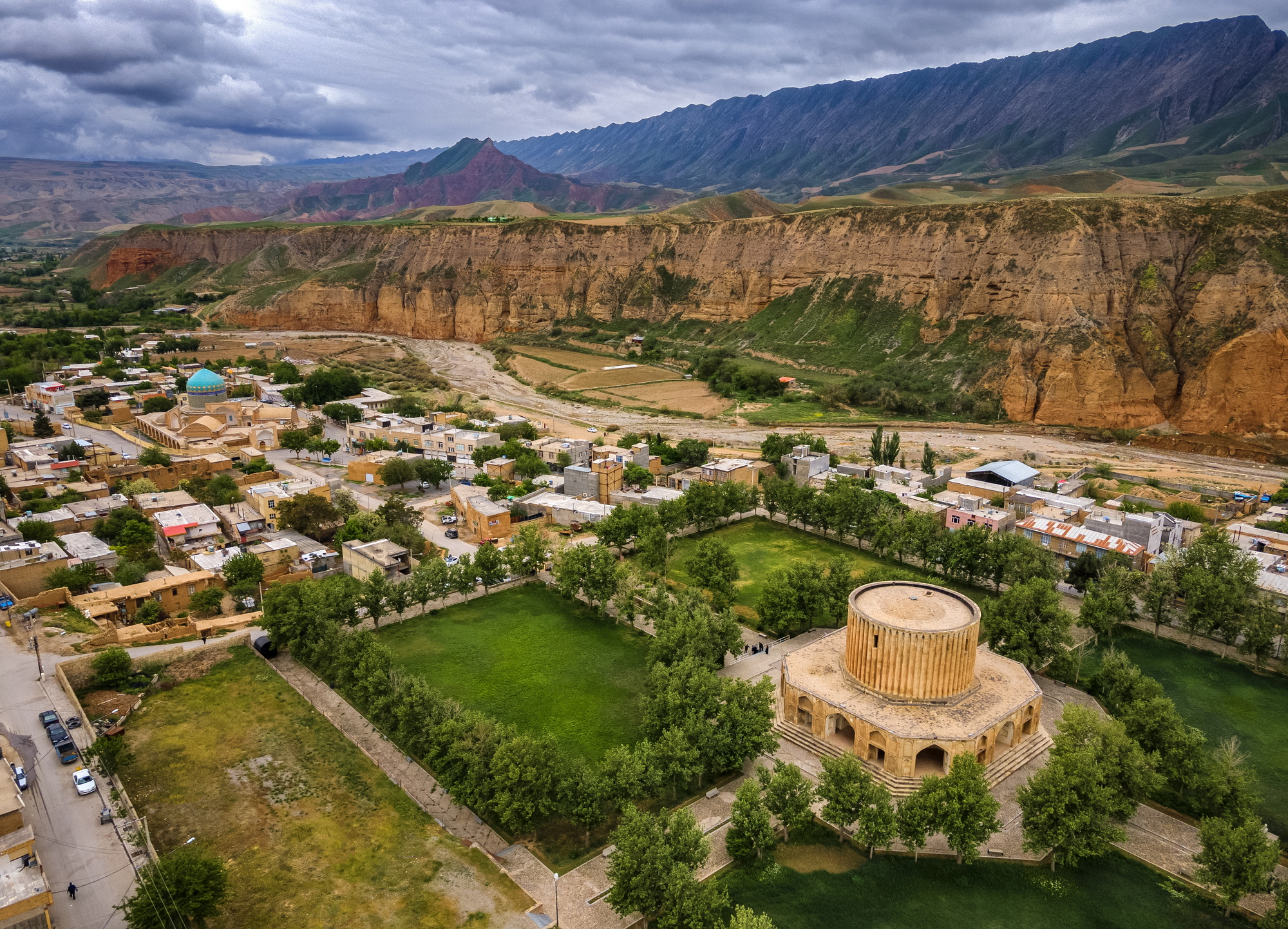

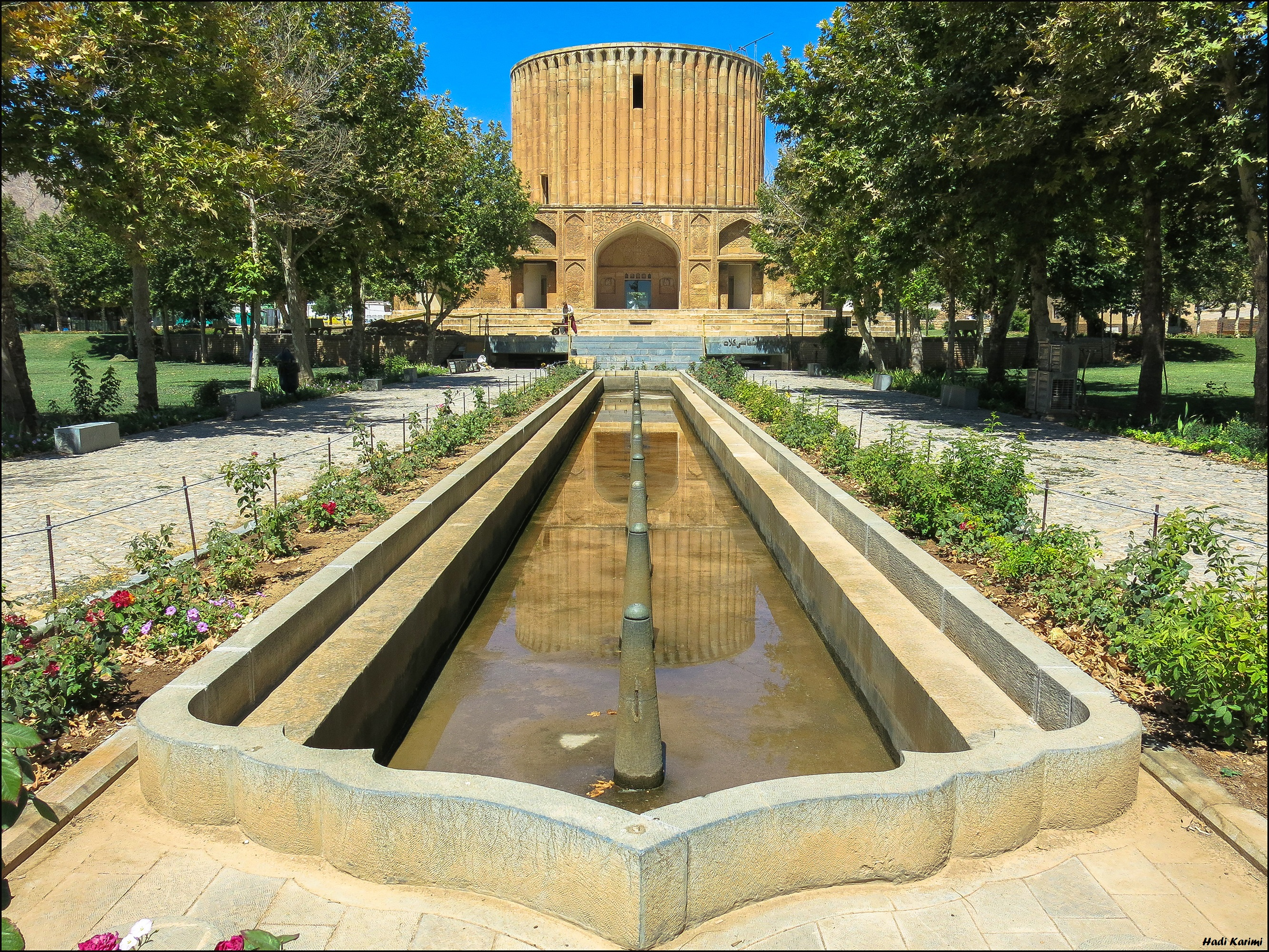

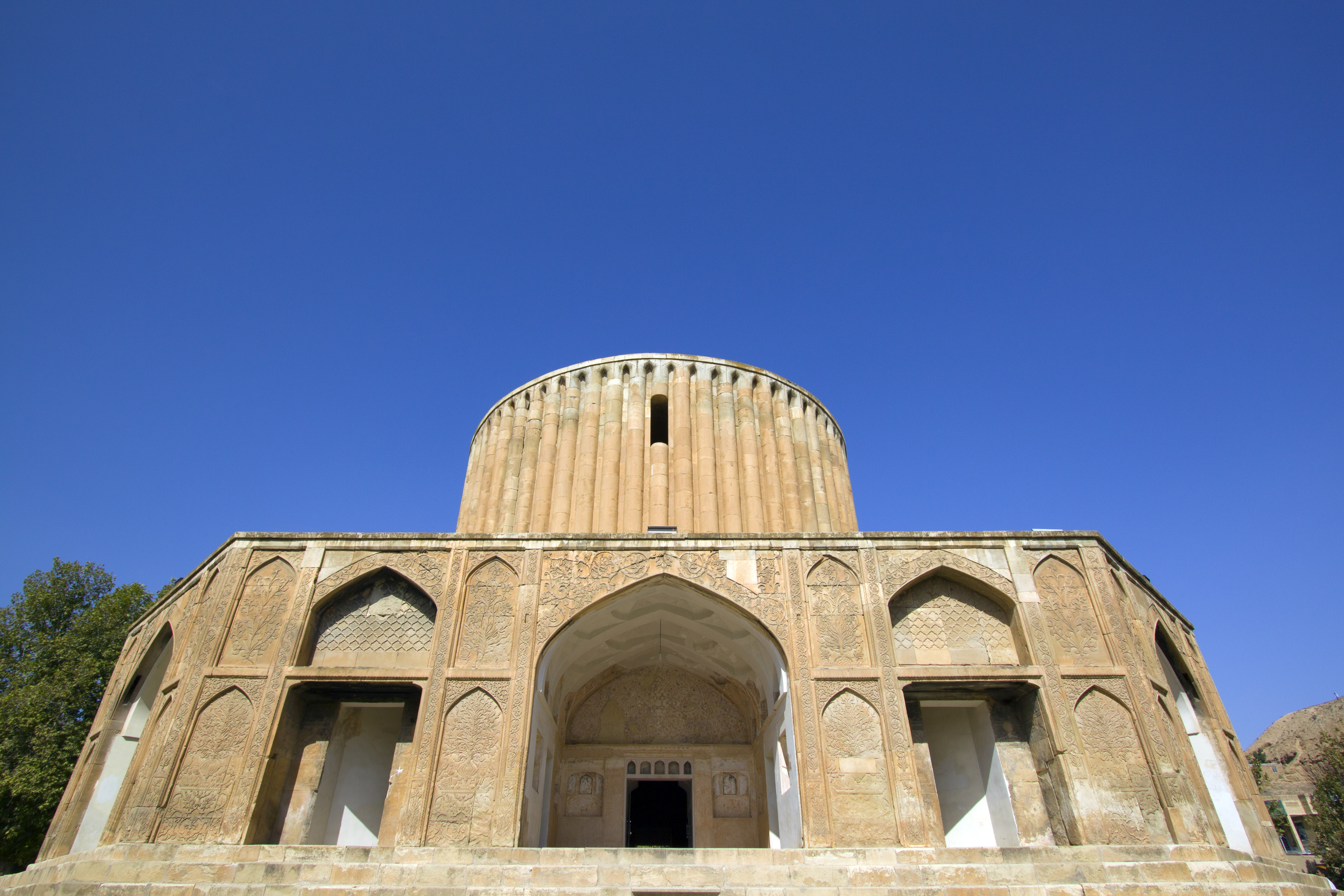

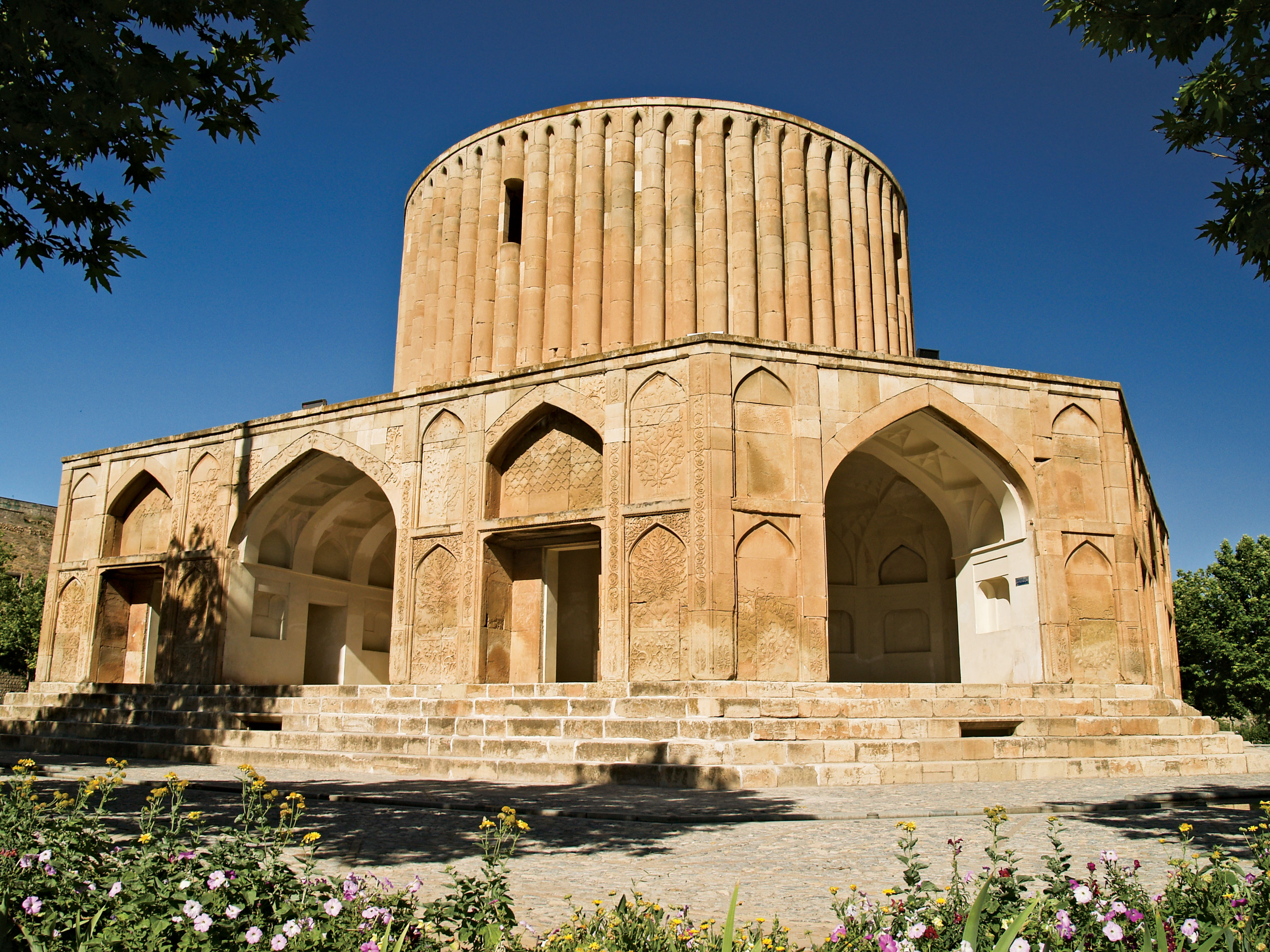

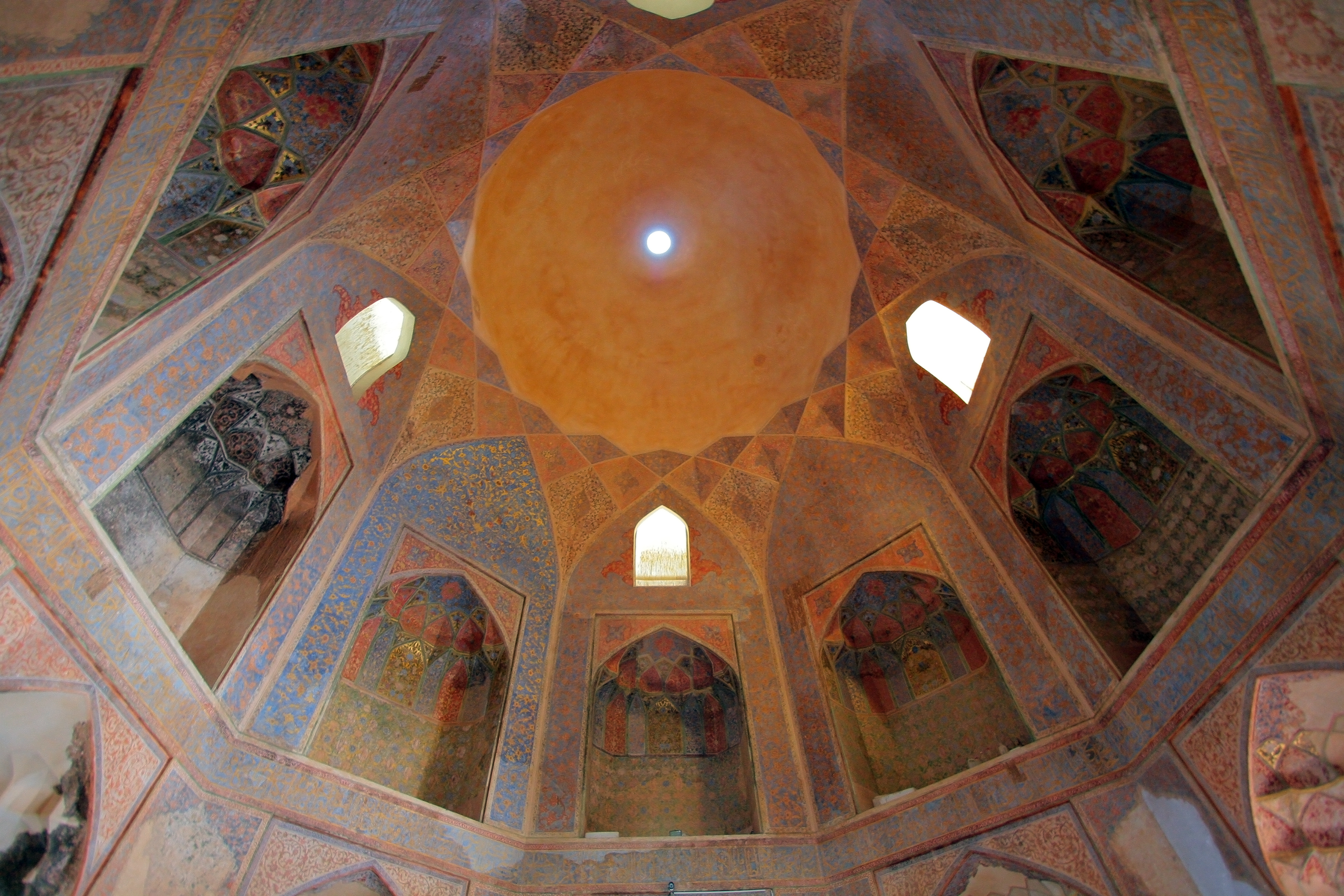

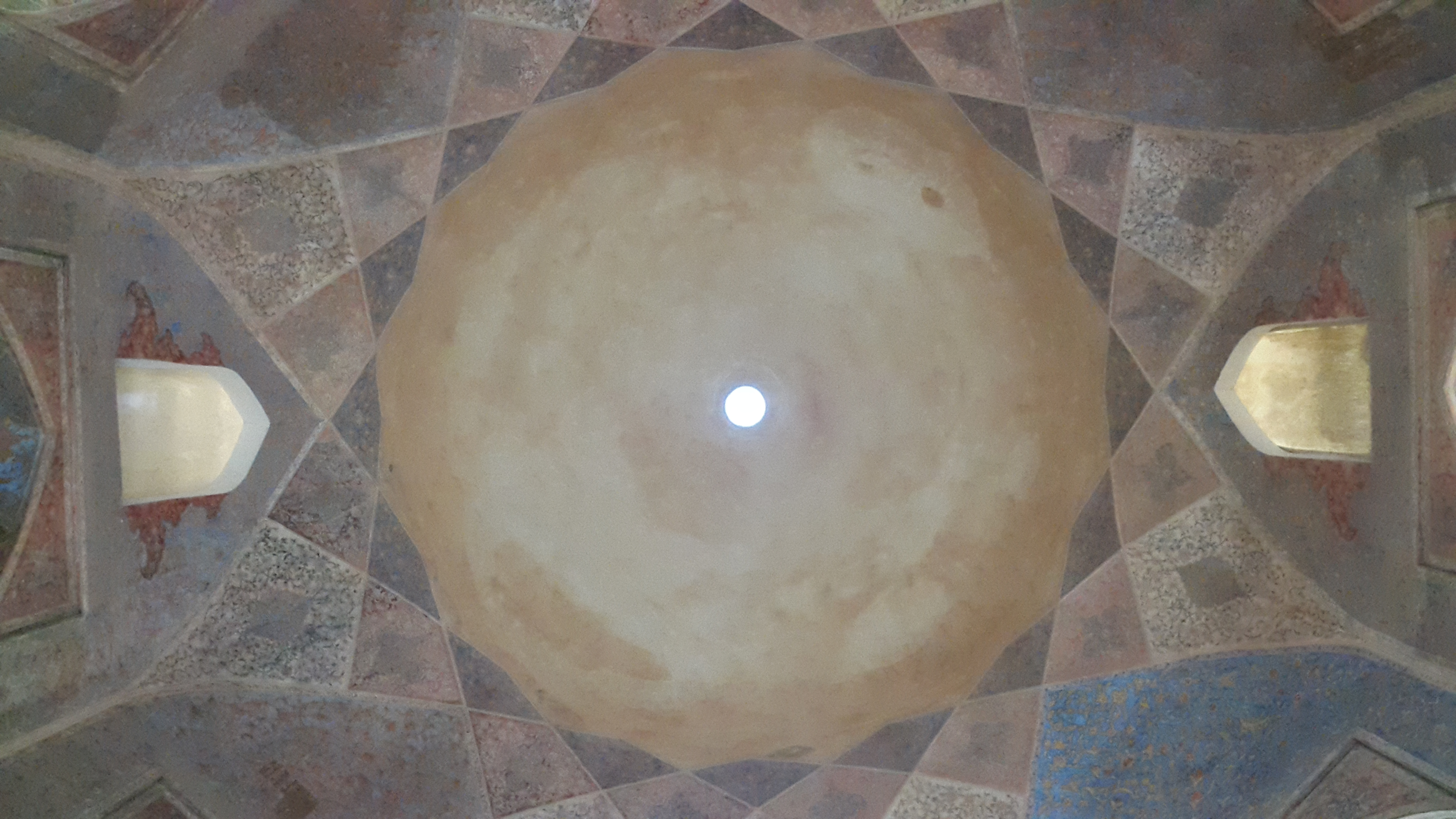

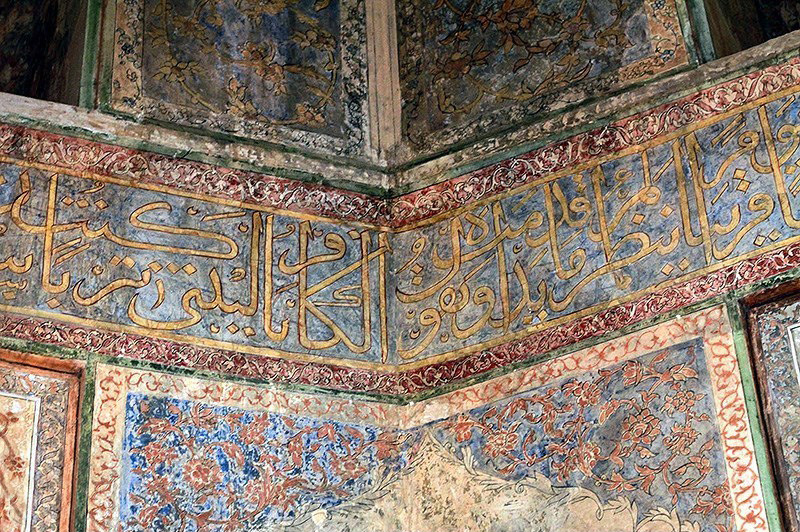
