= Qeshlaq-e Hajjilar, Ahar =

Qeshlaq-e Hajjilar قشلاق حاجيلار
- Village
- Location within Iran
- Coordinates: 38°26′52″N 47°22′06″E
- Country: Iran
- Province: East Azerbaijan
- County: Ahar
- Bakhsh: Central
- Rural District: Qeshlaq

Population (2006)
  - Total: 24
- Time zone: UTC+3:30 (IRST)
  - Summer (DST): UTC+4:30 (IRDT)

Qeshlaq-e Hajjilar (Persian: قشلاق حاجيلار, also Romanized as Qeshlāq-e Ḩājjīlār and Qeshlāq-e Ḩājjīlar) is a village in Qeshlaq Rural District, in the Central District of Ahar County, East Azerbaijan Province, Iran. At the 2006 census, its population was 24, in 5 families.
