= Ali Yar, Khuzestan =

Ali Yar علي يار
- Village
- Location within Iran
- Coordinates: 32°14′53″N 49°22′21″E
- Country: Iran
- Province: Khuzestan
- County: Andika
- Bakhsh: Central
- Rural District: Qaleh-ye Khvajeh

Population (2006)
  - Total: 92
- Time zone: UTC+3:30 (IRST)
  - Summer (DST): UTC+4:30 (IRDT)

Ali Yar (Persian: علي يار, also Romanized as ‘Alī Yār; also known as ‘Alī Yār-e Dowrāb, ‘Alī Yār-e Dūrāb, Shīr Kosh, and Shīrkoshābād) is a village in Qaleh-ye Khvajeh Rural District, in the Central District of Andika County, Khuzestan Province, Iran. At the 2006 census, its population was 92, in 13 families.
