= Ali Yar, East Azerbaijan =

Village in East Azerbaijan province, Iran

Ali Yar Persian: علي يار
- Village
- Location within Iran
- Coordinates: 38°39′26″N 46°28′01″E
- Country: Iran
- Province: East Azerbaijan
- County: Varzaqan
- District: Kharvana
- Rural District: Jushin

Population (2016)
  - Total: 285
- Time zone: UTC+3:30 (IRST)

Ali Yar (Persian: علي يار) (Note: Also romanized as ‘Alī Yār; also known as Aliar and ‘Alyār) is a village in Jushin Rural District of Kharvana District in Varzaqan County, (Note: Formerly Arsbaran County) East Azerbaijan province, Iran.

== Demographics ==
=== Population ===
At the time of the 2006 National Census, the village's population was 182 in 45 households. The following census in 2011 counted 185 people in 47 households. The 2016 census measured the population of the village as 285 people in 90 households.
