= Yarali-ye Sofla =

Yarali-ye Sofla يارعلي سفلي
- Village
- Country: Iran
- Province: Lorestan
- County: Delfan
- Bakhsh: Central
- Rural District: Nurali

Population (2006)
  - Total: 21
- Time zone: UTC+3:30 (IRST)
  - Summer (DST): UTC+4:30 (IRDT)

Yarali-ye Sofla (Persian: يارعلي سفلي, also Romanized as Yār‘alī-ye Soflá) is a village in Nurali Rural District, in the Central District of Delfan County, Lorestan Province, Iran. At the 2006 census, its population was 21, in 4 families.
