= Sirzar, Mashhad =

Sirzar سيرزار
- Village
- Location within Iran
- Coordinates: 35°50′07″N 59°26′37″E
- Country: Iran
- Province: Razavi Khorasan
- County: Mashhad
- Bakhsh: Ahmadabad
- Rural District: Piveh Zhan

Population (2006)
  - Total: 125
- Time zone: UTC+3:30 (IRST)
  - Summer (DST): UTC+4:30 (IRDT)

Sirzar (Persian: سيرزار, also Romanized as Sīrzār) is a village in Piveh Zhan Rural District, Ahmadabad District, Mashhad County, Razavi Khorasan Province, Iran. At the 2006 census, its population was 125, in 33 families.
