= Jushin Rural District =

Rural district in East Azerbaijan province, Iran

Jushin Rural District Persian: دهستان جوشين
- Rural District
- Location within Iran
- Coordinates: 38°39′N 46°25′E
- Country: Iran
- Province: East Azerbaijan
- County: Varzaqan
- District: Kharvana
- Established: 1987
- Capital: Jushin

Population (2016)
  - Total: 4,454
- Time zone: UTC+3:30 (IRST)

Jushin Rural District (Persian: دهستان جوشين) is in Kharvana District of Varzaqan County, (Note: Formerly Arsbaran County) East Azerbaijan province, Iran. Its capital is the village of Jushin.

== Demographics ==
=== Population ===
At the time of the 2006 National Census, the rural district's population was 4,308 in 1,026 households. There were 3,637 inhabitants in 984 households at the following census of 2011. The 2016 census measured the population of the rural district as 4,454 in 1,449 households. The most populous of its 15 villages was Seqay, with 722 people.

=== Other villages in the rural district ===
- Ali Yar
- Anviq
- Astmal
- Galv
- Negarestan
- Yengejeh
