= Dizmar-e Markazi Rural District =

Rural district in East Azerbaijan province, Iran

Dizmar-e Markazi Rural District Persian: دهستان ديزمار مركزئ
- Rural District
- Location within Iran
- Coordinates: 38°41′N 46°11′E
- Country: Iran
- Province: East Azerbaijan
- County: Varzaqan
- District: Kharvana
- Established: 1987
- Capital: Kharvana

Population (2016)
  - Total: 4,091
- Time zone: UTC+3:30 (IRST)

Dizmar-e Markazi Rural District (Persian: دهستان ديزمار مركزئ) is in Kharvana District of Varzaqan County, (Note: Formerly Arsbaran County) East Azerbaijan province, Iran. It is administered from the city of Kharvana.

== Demographics ==
=== Population ===
At the time of the 2006 National Census, the rural district's population was 2,632 in 633 households. There were 2,417 inhabitants in 651 households at the following census of 2011. The 2016 census measured the population of the rural district as 4,091 in 1,274 households. The most populous of its 19 villages was Lilab, with 764 people.

=== Other villages in the rural district ===
- Dastjerd
- Malek Qozat
- Marzabad
- Nechaq
