= Arzil Rural District =

Rural district in East Azerbaijan province, Iran

Arzil Rural District Persian: دهستان ارزيل
- Rural District
- Location within Iran
- Coordinates: 38°32′N 46°12′E
- Country: Iran
- Province: East Azerbaijan
- County: Varzaqan
- District: Kharvana
- Capital: Arzil

Population (2016)
  - Total: 4,855
- Time zone: UTC+3:30 (IRST)

Arzil Rural District (Persian: دهستان ارزيل) is in Kharvana District of Varzaqan County, (Note: Formerly Arsbaran County) East Azerbaijan province, Iran. Its capital is the village of Arzil.

== Demographics ==
=== Population ===
At the time of the 2006 National Census, the rural district's population was 4,296 in 1,073 households. There were 4,060 inhabitants in 1,160 households at the following census of 2011. The 2016 census measured the population of the rural district as 4,855 in 1,550 households. The most populous of its 16 villages was Andergan, with 1,162 people.

=== Other villages in the rural district ===
- Golakhor
- Iri-ye Olya
- Tarzam
