= Hezarmasjed Rural District =

Rural district in Razavi Khorasan province, Iran

Hezarmasjed Rural District Persian: دهستان هزارمسجد
- Rural District
- Location within Iran
- Coordinates: 37°13′N 59°27′E
- Country: Iran
- Province: Razavi Khorasan
- County: Kalat
- District: Hezarmasjed
- Established: 1987
- Capital: Kalu

Population (2016)
  - Total: 6,075
- Time zone: UTC+3:30 (IRST)

Hezarmasjed Rural District (Persian: دهستان هزارمسجد) is in Hezarmasjed District of Kalat County, Razavi Khorasan province, Iran. Its capital is the village of Kalu. The previous capital of the rural district was the village of Hasanabad, now the city of Hasanabad-e Layen-e Now.

== Demographics ==
=== Ethnicity ===
Ethnically, the population is a mixture of Kurds and Turkmens, with a smaller Persian population.

=== Population ===
At the time of the 2006 National Census, the rural district's population (as a part of the Central District) was 6,010 in 1,428 households. There were 5,772 inhabitants in 1,578 households at the following census of 2011. The 2016 census measured the population of the rural district as 6,075 in 1,869 households. The most populous of its 18 villages was Hasanabad-e Layen-e Now (now a city), with 2,872 people.

In 2021, the rural district was separated from the district in the formation of Hezarmasjed District.

=== Other villages in the rural district ===
- Asadabad
- Hajjiabad
- Karnaveh-ye Shirin
