= Kabud Gonbad Rural District =

Rural district in Razavi Khorasan province, Iran

Kabud Gonbad Rural District Persian: دهستان كبود گنبد
- Rural District
- Location within Iran
- Coordinates: 37°01′N 59°50′E
- Country: Iran
- Province: Razavi Khorasan
- County: Kalat
- District: Central
- Established: 1986
- Capital: Jalilabad

Population (2016)
  - Total: 8,058
- Time zone: UTC+3:30 (IRST)

Kabud Gonbad Rural District (Persian: دهستان كبود گنبد) is in the Central District of Kalat County, Razavi Khorasan province, Iran. Its capital is the village of Jalilabad.

== Demographics ==
=== Population ===
At the time of the 2006 National Census, the rural district's population was 10,389 in 2,541 households. There were 9,117 inhabitants in 2,575 households at the following census of 2011. The 2016 census measured the population of the rural district as 8,058 in 2,514 households. The most populous of its 21 villages was Garu, with 1,724 people.

=== Other villages in the rural district ===
- Aqdash
- Khalaj-e Sofla
- Khesht-e Nadari
- Nafteh
- Qaleh Zow
