= Hezarmasjed District =

District in Razavi Khorasan province, Iran

Hezarmasjed District Persian: بخش هزارمسجد
- District
- Location within Iran
- Coordinates: 37°08′N 59°26′E
- Country: Iran
- Province: Razavi Khorasan
- County: Kalat
- Established: 2021
- Capital: Hasanabad-e Layen-e Now
- Time zone: UTC+3:30 (IRST)

Hezarmasjed District (Persian: بخش هزارمسجد) is in Kalat County, Razavi Khorasan province, Iran. Its capital is the city of Hasanabad-e Layen-e Now, whose population at the time of the 2016 National Census was 2,872 people in 877 households.

== History ==
In 2021, Hezarmasjed Rural District was separated from the Central District in the formation of Hezarmasjed District. The village of Hasanabad-e Layen-e Now was converted to a city in the same year.

== Demographics ==
=== Administrative divisions ===
Hezarmasjed District
Administrative Divisions
Hezarmasjed RD
Layen RD
Hasanabad-e Layen-e Now (city) (Note: Became a city after the 2016 census)
RD = Rural District
