= Kalat County =

County in Razavi Khorasan Province, Iran

Kalat County Persian: شهرستان کلات
- County
- Landscape near Spa Waterfall

- Location of Kalat County in Razavi Khorasan province (top right, purple)

- Location of Razavi Khorasan province in Iran
- Interactive map of Kalat County
- Coordinates: 36°51′N 59°52′E
- Country: Iran
- Province: Razavi Khorasan
- Established: 2003
- Capital: Kalat
- Districts: Central, Hezarmasjed, Zavin

Area
  - Total: 3,503 km^{2} (1,353 sq mi)

Population (2016)
  - Total: 36,237
  - Density: 10.34/km^{2} (26.79/sq mi)
- Time zone: UTC+3:30 (IRST)

Kalat County (Persian: شهرستان کلات) is in Razavi Khorasan province, Iran. Its capital is the city of Kalat.

== History ==
In 2021, Charam Rural District was created in the Central District, and Hezarmasjed Rural District was separated from it in the formation of Hezarmasjed District, including the new Layen Rural District. The villages of Chenar and Hasanabad-e Layen-e Now were converted to cities in the same year.

== Demographics ==
=== Ethnicity ===
Around half of the people of Kalat County are Turkic peoples of Azeri origin, Tekke Turkmen; 35% are Kurdish, and 15% are Persian.

=== Population ===
At the time of the 2006 census, the county's population was 39,560 in 9,489 households. The following census in 2011 counted 38,232 people in 10,298 households. The 2016 census measured the population of the county as 36,237, in 10,708 households.

=== Administrative divisions ===
Kalat County's population history and administrative structure over three consecutive censuses are shown in the following table.

Kalat County Population
Administrative Divisions	2006	2011	2016
Central District	22,928	22,421	21,820
Charam RD (Note: Established after the 2016 census)			
Hezarmasjed RD	6,010	5,772	6,075
Kabud Gonbad RD	10,389	9,117	8,058
Kalat (city)	6,529	7,532	7,687
Hezarmasjed District			
Hezarmasjed RD			
Layen RD			
Hasanabad-e Layen-e Now (city) (Note: Became a city after the 2016 census)			
Zavin District	16,632	15,811	14,417
Pasakuh RD	3,647	3,314	3,046
Zavin RD	8,932	8,408	7,626
Chenar (city) (Note: Became a city after the 2016 census)			
Shahr-e Zow (city) (Note: Formerly the village of Zow-e Sofla)	4,053	4,089	3,745
Total	39,560	38,232	36,237
RD = Rural District

== See also ==
Media related to Kalat County at Wikimedia Commons
