= Kharvana District =

District in East Azerbaijan province, Iran

Kharvana District Persian: بخش خاروانا
- District
- Location within Iran
- Coordinates: 38°37′N 46°17′E
- Country: Iran
- Province: East Azerbaijan
- County: Varzaqan
- Capital: Kharvana

Population (2016)
  - Total: 16,753
- Time zone: UTC+3:30 (IRST)

Kharvana District (Persian: بخش خاروانا) is in Varzaqan County, (Note: Formerly Arsbaran County) East Azerbaijan province, Iran. Its capital is the city of Kharvana.

== Demographics ==
=== Population ===
At the time of the 2006 National Census, the district's population was 12,878 in 3,147 households. The following census in 2011 counted 11,495 people in 3,111 households. The 2016 census measured the population of the district as 16,753 inhabitants in 5,308 households.

=== Administrative divisions ===
Kharvana District Population
Administrative Divisions	2006	2011	2016
Arzil RD	4,296	4,068	4,855
Dizmar-e Markazi RD	2,632	2,417	4,091
Jushin RD	4,308	3,637	4,454
Kharvana (city)	1,642	1,373	3,353
Total	12,878	11,495	16,753
RD = Rural District
