= Central District (Kalat County) =

District in Razavi Khorasan province, Iran

Central District (Kalat County) Persian: بخش مرکزی شهرستان کلات
- District
- Interactive map of Central District (Kalat County)
- Location within Iran
- Coordinates: 37°00′N 59°45′E
- Country: Iran
- Province: Razavi Khorasan
- County: Kalat
- Established: 2003
- Capital: Kalat

Population (2016)
  - Total: 21,820
- Time zone: UTC+3:30 (IRST)

The Central District of Kalat County (Persian: بخش مرکزی شهرستان کلات) is in Razavi Khorasan province, Iran. Its capital is the city of Kalat.

== History ==
In 2021, Charam Rural District was created in the district, and Hezarmasjed Rural District was separated from it in the formation of Hezarmasjed District.

== Demographics ==
=== Population ===
At the time of the 2006 National Census, the district's population was 22,928 in 5,630 households. The following census in 2011 counted 22,421 people in 6,086 households. The 2016 census measured the population of the district as 21,820 inhabitants in 6,493 households.

=== Administrative divisions ===
Central District (Kalat County) Population
Administrative Divisions	2006	2011	2016
Charam RD (Note: Established after the 2016 census)			
Hezarmasjed RD (Note: Transferred to Hezarmasjed District after the 2016 census)	6,010	5,772	6,075
Kabud Gonbad RD	10,389	9,117	8,058
Kalat (city)	6,529	7,532	7,687
Total	22,928	22,421	21,820
RD = Rural District
