= Azizabad =

Azizabad (Persian: عزيز آباد) may refer to:

== Afghanistan ==
- Azizabad, Herat in Afghanistan

== Azerbaijan ==
- Əzizabad, a village in Azerbaijan

== Iran ==
=== Ardabil Province ===
- Azizabad, Bileh Savar, a village in Bileh Savar County
- Azizabad, Khalkhal, a village in Khalkhal County

=== Chaharmahal and Bakhtiari Province ===
- Azizabad-e Olya, a village in Ardal County
- Azizabad-e Sofla, a village in Ardal County

=== East Azerbaijan Province ===
- Azizabad, East Azerbaijan, a village in Hashtrud County

=== Fars Province ===
- Azizabad, Firuzabad, a village in Firuzabad County

=== Golestan Province ===
- Azizabad, Golestan, a village in Kalaleh County

=== Hormozgan Province ===
- Azizabad, Hormozgan, a village in Rudan County

=== Isfahan Province ===
- Azizabad, Isfahan, a village in Tiran and Karvan County

=== Kerman Province ===
- Azizabad-e Sheybani, a village in Anbarabad County
- Azizabad, Narmashir, a village in Narmashir County
- Azizabad, alternate name of Qaleh-ye Azizabad, a village in Narmashir County
- Azizabad Rural District, in Narmashir County
- Azizabad, Rigan, a village in Rigan County
- Azizabad, Rudbar-e Jonubi, a village in Rudbar-e Jonubi County
- Azizabad, Vahdat, a village in Zarand County

=== Kermanshah Province ===
- Azizabad, Harsin, a village in Harsin County
- Azizabad, Javanrud, a village in Javanrud County
- Azizabad, Kangavar, a village in Kangavar County
- Azizabad, Sahneh, a village in Sahneh County
- Azizabad, Dinavar, a village in Sahneh County
- Azizabad, Salas-e Babajani, a village in Salas-e Babajani County

=== Kurdistan Province ===
- Azizabad, Qaratureh, a village in Divandarreh County

=== Lorestan Province ===
==== Azna County ====
- Azizabad-e Qeytasvand, a village in Azna County

==== Delfan County ====
- Azizabad, Delfan, a village in Delfan County
- Azizabad, Kakavand, a village in Delfan County
- Azizabad, alternate name of Aziz Koshteh, a village in Delfan County
- Azizabad, alternate name of Mohammad Shahabad, a village in Delfan County
- Azizabad-e Pain, a village in Delfan County

==== Dorud County ====
- Azizabad, Dorud, a village in Dorud County

==== Rumeshkhan County ====
- Azizabad, Rumeshkhan, a village in Rumeshkhan County

==== Selseleh County ====
- Azizabad, Selseleh, a village in Selseleh County

=== Markazi Province ===
- Azizabad, Farahan, a village in Farahan County
- Azizabad, Saveh, a village in Saveh County

=== Mazandaran Province ===
- Azizabad, Mazandaran, a village in Tonekabon County

=== North Khorasan Province ===
- Azizabad, North Khorasan, a village in Maneh and Samalqan County

=== Razavi Khorasan Province ===
- Azizabad, Gonabad, a village in Gonabad County
- Azizabad, Kalat, a village in Kalat County
- Azizabad, Sabzevar, a village in Sabzevar County

=== Sistan and Baluchestan Province ===
- Azizabad, Iranshahr, a village in Iranshahr County
- Azizabad, Qasr-e Qand, a village in Qasr-e Qand County

=== South Khorasan Province ===
- Azizabad, South Khorasan, a village in Boshruyeh County

=== Tehran Province ===
- Azizabad, Rey, a village in Rey County

=== Yazd Province ===
- Azizabad, Abarkuh, a village in Abarkuh County
- Azizabad, Bafq, a village in Bafq County

=== Zanjan Province ===
- Azizabad, Zanjan, a village in Tarom County

== Pakistan ==
- Azizabad (Karachi), a suburb of Gulberg Town in Karachi, Sindh, Pakistan
- Azizabad (Murree), a village near Kali mitti in Punjab, Pakistan
- Azizabad (Nasirabad), a village near Dera Jamali, Balochistan, Pakistan

== Other ==
- Azizabad airstrike
