= Tavakkolabad =

Tavakkolabad or Tavokkalabad or Tuklabad (Persian: توكل اباد) may refer to:

== Fars Province ==
- Tavakkolabad, Fars, a village in Darab County
- Tavakkolabad, Mamasani, a village in Mamasani County

== Kerman Province ==
- Tavakkolabad, Anar, a village in Anar County
- Tavakkolabad, Anbarabad, a village in Anbarabad County
- Tavakkolabad, Jebalbarez-e Jonubi, a village in Anbarabad County
- Tavakkolabad, Bam, a village in Bam County
- Tavakkolabad-e Amid, a village in Barsir County
- Tavakkolabad-e Hanarmand, a village in Barsir County
- Tavakkolabad, Fahraj, a village in Fahraj County
- Tavakkolabad, Jiroft, a village in Jiroft County
- Tavakkolabad, Kahnuj, a village in Kahnuj County
- Tavakkolabad, Kerman, a village in Kerman County
- Tavakkolabad, Rayen, a village in Kerman County
- Tavakkolabad, Rabor, a village in Rabor County
- Tavakkolabad, Rafsanjan, a village in Rafsanjan County
- Tavakkolabad-e Do, Rigan, a village in Rigan County
- Tavakkolabad-e Yek, a village in Rigan County
- Tavakkolabad, Rudbar-e Jonubi, a village in Rudbar-e Jonubi County
- Tavakkolabad, Jazmurian, a village in Rudbar-e Jonubi County
- Tavakkolabad, alternate name of Takolabad, a village in Rudbar-e Jonubi County
- Tavakkolabad, Khatunabad, a village in Shahr-e Babak County
- Tavakkolabad, Khursand, a village in Shahr-e Babak County

== Kermanshah Province ==
- Tavakkolabad, Kermanshah, a village in Kermanshah County

== Razavi Khorasan Province ==
- Tuklabad, Razavi Khorasan

== Sistan and Baluchestan Province ==
- Tavakkolabad (28°37′ N 60°16′ E), Kurin
- Tavakkolabad (28°37′ N 60°26′ E), Kurin
- Tavakkolabad, Mirjaveh
- Tavakkolabad (2), Mirjaveh
- Tavakkolabad, Zahedan
- Tavakkolabad-e Hurshi, Zahedan County
- Tavakkolabad-e Minuyi

== See also ==
- Kalateh-ye Tuklabad
