= Rigabad =

Rigabad (Persian: ريگ اباد), sometimes rendered as Rik Abad and Rikabad, may refer to:

- Rigabad, Anbarabad, Kerman Province
- Rigabad, Bardsir, Kerman Province
- Rigabad, Fahraj, Kerman Province
- Rigabad, Negin Kavir, Fahraj County, Kerman Province
- Rigabad, Maskun, Jiroft County, Kerman Province
- Rigabad, Manujan, Kerman Province
- Rigabad, Ravar, Kerman Province
- Rigabad, Nehzatabad, Rudbar-e Jonubi County, Kerman Province
- Rigabad, Rudbar, Rudbar-e Jonubi County, Kerman Province
- Rigabad, Eskelabad, Khash County, Sistan and Baluchestan Province
- Rigabad, South Khorasan
- Rigabad, Piranshahr, West Azerbaijan Province
- Rigabad, Salmas, West Azerbaijan Province
- Rigabad, Urmia, West Azerbaijan Province
