= Nehzatabad =

Nehzatabad (Persian: نهضت اباد) may refer to:

- Nehzatabad, Fereydunshahr, Isfahan Province
- Nehzatabad, Najafabad, Isfahan Province
- Nehzatabad, Kerman
- Nehzatabad, Manujan, Kerman Province
- Nehzatabad, Rudbar-e Jonubi, Kerman Province
- Nehzatabad, Jazmurian, Rudbar-e Jonubi County, Kerman Province
- Nehzatabad, Khuzestan
- Nehzatabad, Kohgiluyeh and Boyer-Ahmad
- Nehzatabad Rural District, in Kerman Province
