= Bizhanabad =

Bizhanabad (Persian: بيژن اباد) may refer to various places in Iran:

- Bizhanabad, Bardsir, Kerman Province
- Bizhanabad 1, Kerman Province
- Bizhanabad 2, Kerman Province
- Bizhanabad-e Sofla, alternate name of Azizabad, Rudbar-e Jonubi, Kerman Province
- Bizhanabad-e Vosta, Kerman Province
- Bizhanabad, South Khorasan
- Bizhanabad, West Azerbaijan
- Bizhanabad Rural District, Rudbar-e Jonubi County, Kerman province
