= Chah-e Hasan Ahmadi =

Village in Kerman province, Iran

Chah-e Hasan Ahmadi Persian: چاه حسن احمدی
- Village
- Location within Iran
- Coordinates: 27°52′51″N 58°19′14″E
- Country: Iran
- Province: Kerman
- County: Jazmurian
- District: Chah-e Hasan
- Rural District: Chah-e Hasan

Population (2016)
  - Total: 173
- Time zone: UTC+3:30 (IRST)

Chah-e Hasan Ahmadi (Persian: چاه حسن احمدی) is a village in, and the capital of, Chah-e Hasan Rural District of Chah-e Hasan District, Jazmurian County, Kerman province, Iran.

== Population ==
At the time of the 2006 National Census, the village's population was below the reporting threshold, when it was in Jazmurian Rural District of Jazmurian District (Note: Renamed the Central District of Jazmurian County) in Rudbar-e Jonubi County. The population was again below the threshold in the following census of 2011. The 2016 census measured the population of the village as 173 people in 43 households.

In 2023, the district was separated from the county in the establishment of Jazmurian County and renamed the Central District. Chah-e Hasan Ahmadi was transferred to Chah-e Hasan Rural District created in the new Chah-e Hasan District.
