= Mohammadabad-e Kataki, Iran =

Village in Kerman province, Iran

Mohammadabad-e Kataki Persian: محمداباد كتكي
- Village
- Location within Iran
- Coordinates: 27°50′20″N 58°21′34″E
- Country: Iran
- Province: Kerman
- County: Jazmurian
- District: Chah-e Hasan
- Rural District: Chah-e Hasan

Population (2016)
  - Total: 1,548
- Time zone: UTC+3:30 (IRST)

Mohammadabad-e Kataki (Persian: محمداباد كتكي) (Note: Also romanized as Moḩammadābād-e Katakī) is a village in Chah-e Hasan Rural District of Chah-e Hasan District, Jazmurian County, Kerman province, Iran, serving as capital of the district.

== Demographics ==
=== Population ===
At the time of the 2006 National Census, the village's population was 560 in 113 households, when it was in Jazmurian Rural District of the former Jazmurian District of Rudbar-e Jonubi County. The following census in 2011 counted 1,513 people in 337 households. The 2016 census measured the population of the village as 1,548 people in 363 households.

In 2023, the district was separated from the county in the establishment of Jazmurian County, and Mohammadabad-e Kataki was transferred to Chah-e Hasan Rural District created in the new Chah-e Hasan District.
