= Mokhtarabad =

Mokhtarabad (Persian: مختارآباد) may refer to the following places in Iran:

- Mokhtarabad, Alborz
- Mokhtarabad, Ardabil
- Mokhtarabad, Fars
- Mokhtarabad, Kerman
- Mokhtarabad, Rudbar-e Jonubi, Kerman Province
- Mokhtarabad, Jazmurian, Rudbar-e Jonubi County, Kerman Province
- Mokhtarabad, Lorestan
