= Mohammadabad-e Do Ziyarati =

Village in Kerman province, Iran

Mohammadabad-e Do Ziyarati Persian: محمداباددوزيارتي
- Village
- Location within Iran
- Coordinates: 27°52′49″N 57°59′04″E
- Country: Iran
- Province: Kerman
- County: Rudbar-e Jonubi
- District: Halil Dasht
- Rural District: Abbasabad

Population (2016)
  - Total: 666
- Time zone: UTC+3:30 (IRST)

Mohammadabad-e Do Ziyarati (Persian: محمداباددوزيارتي) (Note: Also romanized as Moḩammadābād-e Do Zīyāratī and Moḩammadābād-e Dozīyārtaī) is a village in Abbasabad Rural District of Halil Dasht District, Rudbar-e Jonubi County, Kerman province, Iran.

== Demographics ==
=== Population ===
At the time of the 2006 National Census, the village's population was 850 in 143 households, when it was in Nehzatabad Rural District of the Central District. The following census in 2011 counted 850 people in 187 households. The 2016 census measured the population of the village as 666 people in 180 households.

In 2023, the rural district was separated from the district in the formation of Halil Dasht District. Mohammadabad-e Do Ziyarati was transferred to Abbasabad Rural District created in the new district.
