= Lab Feravan =

Village in Kerman province, Iran

Lab Feravan Persian: كلاتنگ
- Village
- Location within Iran
- Coordinates: 27°47′09″N 58°33′55″E
- Country: Iran
- Province: Kerman
- County: Jazmurian
- District: Central
- Rural District: Jazmurian

Population (2016)
  - Total: 1,268
- Time zone: UTC+3:30 (IRST)

Lab Feravan (Persian: لب فراوان) (Note: Also romanized as Lab Ferāvān; also known as ‘Alīābād) is a village in Jazmurian Rural District of the Central District (Note: Formerly Jazmurian District of Rudbar-e Jonubi County) of Jazmurian County, Kerman province, Iran.

== Demographics ==
=== Population ===
At the time of the 2006 National Census, the village's population was 916 in 175 households, when it was in Jazmurian District (Note: Renamed the Central District of Jazmurian County) of Rudbar-e Jonubi County. The following census in 2011 counted 1,262 people in 286 households. The 2016 census measured the population of the village as 1,268 people in 286 households.

In 2023, the district was separated from the county in the establishment of Jazmurian County and renamed the Central District.
