= Hoseynabad-e Zeh-e Kalut =

Neighborhood in Kerman province, Iran

Hoseynabad-e Zeh-e Kalut Persian: حسين ابا دز كلوت
- Neighborhood
- Location within Iran
- Coordinates: 27°46′17″N 58°38′51″E
- Country: Iran
- Province: Kerman
- County: Jazmurian
- District: Central
- City: Zeh-e Kalut

Population (2011)
  - Total: 1,109
- Time zone: UTC+3:30 (IRST)

Hoseynabad-e Zeh-e Kalut (Persian: حسين ابا دز كلوت) (Note: Also romanized as Hoseynabad-e Zeh Kalut and Ḩoseynābād-e Zeh Kalūt; also known as Ḩoseynābād) is a neighborhood in the city of Zeh-e Kalut in the Central District of Jazmurian County, Kerman province, Iran.

== Demographics ==
=== Population ===
At the time of the 2006 National Census, Hoseynabad-e Zeh-e Kalut's population was 1,213 in 225 households, when it was a village in Jazmurian Rural District of Jazmurian District in Rudbar-e Jonubi County. The following census in 2011 counted 1,109 people in 255 households.

After the census, the village of Zeh-e Kalut merged with the villages of Cheraghabad-e Zeh-e Kalut, Hasanabad-e Zeh-e Kalut, and Hoseynabad-e Zeh-e Kalut, and was elevated to the status of a city.

In 2023, the district was separated from the county in the establishment of Jazmurian County. The city and the rural district were transferred to the new Central District, with Zeh-e Kalut as the county's capital.
