= Borj-e Abbasabad =

Village in Kerman province, Iran

Borj-e Abbasabad Persian: برج عباس اباد
- Village
- Location within Iran
- Coordinates: 28°01′36″N 58°31′29″E
- Country: Iran
- Province: Kerman
- County: Jazmurian
- District: Chah-e Hasan
- Rural District: Kuhestan

Population (2016)
  - Total: 350
- Time zone: UTC+3:30 (IRST)

Borj-e Abbasabad (Persian: برج عباس اباد) (Note: Also romanized as Borj-e ‘Abbāsābād; also known as ‘Abbāsābād and ‘Abbāsābād-e Borjak) is a village in, and the capital of, Kuhestan Rural District of Chah-e Hasan District, Jazmurian County, Kerman province, Iran.

== Demographics ==
=== Population ===
At the time of the 2006 National Census, the village's population was 113 in 24 households, when it was in Jazmurian District (Note: Renamed the Central District of Jazmurian County) of Rudbar-e Jonubi County. The following census in 2011 counted 192 people in 48 households. The 2016 census measured the population of the village as 350 people in 105 households.

In 2023, the district was separated from the county in the establishment of Jazmurian County and renamed the Central District. The rural district was transferred to the new Chah-e Hasan District.
