= Dehnow-e Kuhestan =

Village in Kerman province, Iran

Dehnow-e Kuhestan Persian: دهنو كوهستان
- Village
- Location within Iran
- Coordinates: 28°01′11″N 58°22′43″E
- Country: Iran
- Province: Kerman
- County: Jazmurian
- District: Chah-e Hasan
- Rural District: Kuhestan

Population (2016)
  - Total: 512
- Time zone: UTC+3:30 (IRST)

Dehnow-e-Kuhestan (Persian: دهنوكوهستان) (Note: Also romanized as Deh Now-ye Kūhestān, Dehnow Koohestan, and Dehnow-e-Kūhestan; also known as Deh Now and Deh-e Now) is a village in Kuhestan Rural District of Chah-e Hasan District, Jazmurian County, Kerman province, Iran.

== Demographics ==
=== Population ===
At the time of the 2006 National Census, the village's population was 151 in 38 households, when it was in Jazmurian District (Note: Renamed the Central District of Jazmurian County) of Rudbar-e Jonubi County. The following census in 2011 counted 1,275 people in 352 households. The 2016 census measured the population of the village as 512 people in 130 households. It was the most populous village in its rural district.

In 2023, the district was separated from the county in the establishment of Jazmurian County and renamed the Central District. The rural district was transferred to the new Chah-e Hasan District.
