= Aliabad, Jazmurian County =

Village in Kerman province, Iran

Aliabad Persian: علي اباد
- Village
- Location within Iran
- Coordinates: 27°44′48″N 58°36′06″E
- Country: Iran
- Province: Kerman
- County: Jazmurian
- District: Central
- Rural District: Jazmurian

Population (2016)
  - Total: 149
- Time zone: UTC+3:30 (IRST)

Aliabad (Persian: علي اباد) (Note: Also romanized as ‘Alīābād) is a village in Jazmurian Rural District of the Central District (Note: Formerly Jazmurian District of Rudbar-e Jonubi County) of Jazmurian County, Kerman province, Iran.

== Demographics ==
=== Population ===
At the time of the 2006 National Census, the village's population was 42 in 8 households, when it was in Jazmurian District (Note: Renamed the Central District of Jazmurian County) of Rudbar-e Jonubi County. The village did not appear in the following census of 2011. The 2016 census measured the population of the village as 149 people in 41 households.

In 2023, the district was separated from the county in the establishment of Jazmurian County and renamed the Central District.
