= Boeing, Jazmurian =

Village in Kerman province, Iran

Boeing Persian: بوینگ
- Village
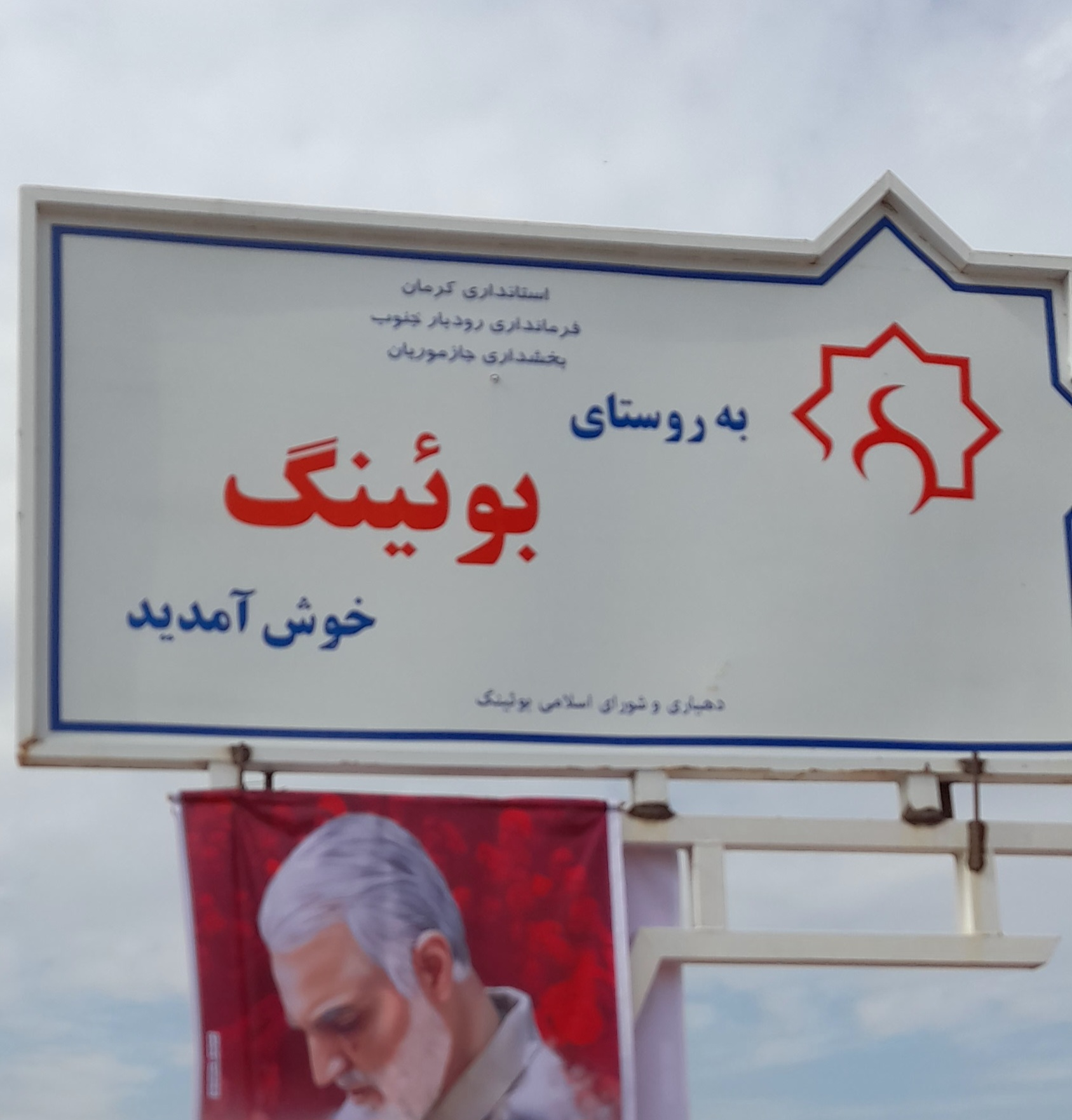

- Location within Iran
- Coordinates: 27°46′36″N 58°26′41″E
- Country: Iran
- Province: Kerman
- County: Jazmurian
- District: Central
- Rural District: Boeing

Population (2016)
  - Total: 1,757
- Time zone: UTC+3:30 (IRST)

Boeing (Persian: بوینگ) (Note: Also romanized as Būeīng; also known as Buheng) is a village in Boeing Rural District of the Central District (Note: Formerly Jazmurian District of Rudbar-e Jonubi County) of Jazmurian County, Kerman province, Iran.

== Demographics ==
=== Population ===
At the time of the 2006 National Census, the village's population was 1,642 in 329 households, when it was in Jazmurian Rural District of Jazmurian District (Note: Renamed the Central District of Jazmurian County) in Rudbar-e Jonubi County). The following census in 2011 counted 1,994 people in 450 households. The 2016 census measured the population of the village as 1,757 people in 461 households.

In 2023, the district was separated from the county in the establishment of Jazmurian County and renamed the Central District, and Boeing was transferred to Boeing Rural District created in the district.
