= Cheragh Rigi Nezhad =

Cheragh Rigi Nezhad چراغ ريگي نژاد
- Village
- Country: Iran
- Province: Kerman
- County: Rudbar-e Jonubi
- Bakhsh: Central
- Rural District: Nehzatabad

Population (2006)
  - Total: 203
- Time zone: UTC+3:30 (IRST)
  - Summer (DST): UTC+4:30 (IRDT)

Cheragh Rigi Nezhad (Persian: چراغ ريگي نژاد, also Romanized as Cherāgh Rīgī Nezhād) is a village in Nehzatabad Rural District, in the Central District of Rudbar-e Jonubi County, Kerman Province, Iran. At the 2006 census, its population was 203, in 41 families.
