= Tumeyri =

Tumeyri توميري
- Village
- Location within Iran
- Coordinates: 28°07′07″N 57°52′54″E
- Country: Iran
- Province: Kerman
- County: Rudbar-e Jonubi
- Bakhsh: Central
- Rural District: Rudbar

Population (2006)
  - Total: 582
- Time zone: UTC+3:30 (IRST)
  - Summer (DST): UTC+4:30 (IRDT)

Tumeyri (Persian: توميري, also Romanized as Tūmeyrī; also known as Tomeyrī) is a village in Rudbar Rural District, in the Central District of Rudbar-e Jonubi County, Kerman Province, Iran. At the 2006 census, its population was 582, in 115 families.
