= Gonj Kesur =

Gonj Kesur گنج كسور
- Village
- Location within Iran
- Coordinates: 28°07′18″N 58°49′31″E
- Country: Iran
- Province: Kerman
- County: Rudbar-e Jonubi
- Bakhsh: Jazmurian
- Rural District: Kuhestan

Population (2006)
  - Total: 185
- Time zone: UTC+3:30 (IRST)
  - Summer (DST): UTC+4:30 (IRDT)

Gonj Kesur (Persian: گنج كسور, also Romanized as Gonj Kesūr; also known as Konj Kesūr) is a village in Kuhestan Rural District, Jazmurian District, Rudbar-e Jonubi County, Kerman Province, Iran. At the 2006 census, its population was 185, in 33 families.
