= Sabz Pushan, Kerman =

Sabz Pushan سبزپوشان
- Village
- Location within Iran
- Coordinates: 27°57′32″N 58°29′59″E
- Country: Iran
- Province: Kerman
- County: Rudbar-e Jonubi
- Bakhsh: Jazmurian
- Rural District: Kuhestan

Population (2006)
  - Total: 51
- Time zone: UTC+3:30 (IRST)
  - Summer (DST): UTC+4:30 (IRDT)

Sabz Pushan (Persian: سبزپوشان, also Romanized as Sabz Pūshān) is a village in Kuhestan Rural District, Jazmurian District, Rudbar-e Jonubi County, Kerman Province, Iran. At the 2006 census, its population was 51, in 10 families.
