= Kahn-e Gholam =

Kahn-e Gholam كهن غلام
- Village
- Location within Iran
- Coordinates: 28°09′56″N 58°02′24″E
- Country: Iran
- Province: Kerman
- County: Rudbar-e Jonubi
- Bakhsh: Central
- Rural District: Rudbar

Population (2006)
  - Total: 88
- Time zone: UTC+3:30 (IRST)
  - Summer (DST): UTC+4:30 (IRDT)

Kahn-e Gholam (Persian: كهن غلام, also Romanized as Kahn-e Gholām) is a village in Rudbar Rural District, in the Central District of Rudbar-e Jonubi County, Kerman Province, Iran. At the 2006 census, its population was 88, in 18 families.
