= Heyr Galu =

Heyr Galu هيرگلو
- Village
- Location within Iran
- Coordinates: 27°52′52″N 58°11′54″E
- Country: Iran
- Province: Kerman
- County: Rudbar-e Jonubi
- Bakhsh: Central
- Rural District: Nehzatabad

Population (2006)
  - Total: 736
- Time zone: UTC+3:30 (IRST)
  - Summer (DST): UTC+4:30 (IRDT)

Heyr Galu (Persian: هيرگلو, also Romanized as Heyr Galū) is a village in Nehzatabad Rural District, in the Central District of Rudbar-e Jonubi County, Kerman Province, Iran. At the 2006 census, its population was 736, in 147 families.
