= Miyandaran =

Village in Kerman province, Iran

Miyandaran Persian: ميان دران
- Village
- Location within Iran
- Coordinates: 27°46′20″N 58°48′22″E
- Country: Iran
- Province: Kerman
- County: Jazmurian
- District: Central
- Rural District: Jazmurian

Population (2016)
  - Total: 1,032
- Time zone: UTC+3:30 (IRST)

Miyandaran (Persian: ميان دران) (Note: Also romanized as Mīyāndarān) is a village in, and the capital of, Jazmurian Rural District of the Central District (Note: Formerly Jazmurian District of Rudbar-e Jonubi County) of Jazmurian County, Kerman province, Iran. The previous capital of the rural district was the village of Zeh-e Kalut, now a city.

== Demographics ==
=== Population ===
At the time of the 2006 National Census, the village's population was 900 in 188 households, when it was in Jazmurian District (Note: Renamed the Central District of Jazmurian County) of Rudbar-e Jonubi County. The following census in 2011 counted 1,749 people in 383 households. The 2016 census measured the population of the village as 1,032 people in 246 households.

In 2023, the district was separated from the county in the establishment of Jazmurian County and renamed the Central District.
