= Shams-e Gaz =

Shams-e Gaz شمس گز
- Village
- Location within Iran
- Coordinates: 27°48′47″N 58°00′28″E
- Country: Iran
- Province: Kerman
- County: Rudbar-e Jonubi
- Bakhsh: Central
- Rural District: Nehzatabad

Population (2006)
  - Total: 278
- Time zone: UTC+3:30 (IRST)
  - Summer (DST): UTC+4:30 (IRDT)

Shams-e Gaz (Persian: شمس گز, also Romanized as Shams Gaz; also known as Shamsi Gaz) is a village in Nehzatabad Rural District, in the Central District of Rudbar-e Jonubi County, Kerman Province, Iran. At the 2006 census, its population was 278, in 50 families.
