= Deh-e Ashraf =

Deh-e Ashraf ده اشرف
- Village
- Location within Iran
- Coordinates: 28°01′46″N 58°35′05″E
- Country: Iran
- Province: Kerman
- County: Rudbar-e Jonubi
- Bakhsh: Jazmurian
- Rural District: Kuhestan

Population (2006)
  - Total: 96
- Time zone: UTC+3:30 (IRST)
  - Summer (DST): UTC+4:30 (IRDT)

Deh-e Ashraf (Persian: ده اشرف, also Romanized as Deh-i-Ashraf) is a village in Kuhestan Rural District, Jazmurian District, Rudbar-e Jonubi County, Kerman Province, Iran. At the 2006 census, its population was 96, in 20 families.
