= Tabaq =

Tabaq طبق
- Village
- Location within Iran
- Coordinates: 28°00′18″N 58°54′22″E
- Country: Iran
- Province: Kerman
- County: Rudbar-e Jonubi
- Bakhsh: Jazmurian
- Rural District: Kuhestan

Population (2006)
  - Total: 297
- Time zone: UTC+3:30 (IRST)
  - Summer (DST): UTC+4:30 (IRDT)

Tabaq (Persian: طبق, also Romanized as Ţabaq; also known as Namdād, Notarkanī Nīmdād, Notarkanī-ye Nīmdād, and Ţabaq-e Namdād) is a village in Kuhestan Rural District, Jazmurian District, Rudbar-e Jonubi County, Kerman Province, Iran. At the 2006 census, its population was 297, in 62 families.
