= Hir Shahabad =

Hir Shahabad هيرشاه اباد
- Village
- Interactive map of Hir Shahabad
- Country: Iran
- Province: Kerman
- County: Rudbar-e Jonubi
- Bakhsh: Central
- Rural District: Nehzatabad

Population (2006)
  - Total: 63
- Time zone: UTC+3:30 (IRST)
  - Summer (DST): UTC+4:30 (IRDT)

Hir Shahabad (Persian: هيرشاه اباد, also Romanized as Hīr Shāhābād) is a village in Nehzatabad Rural District, in the Central District of Rudbar-e Jonubi County, Kerman Province, Iran. At the 2006 census, its population was 63, in 15 families.
