= Takol Hasan =

Takol Hasan تكل حسن
- Village
- Location within Iran
- Coordinates: 27°44′47″N 58°21′39″E
- Country: Iran
- Province: Kerman
- County: Rudbar-e Jonubi
- Bakhsh: Jazmurian
- Rural District: Jazmurian

Population (2006)
  - Total: 338
- Time zone: UTC+3:30 (IRST)
  - Summer (DST): UTC+4:30 (IRDT)

Takol Hasan (Persian: تكل حسن, also romanized as Takol Ḩasan; also known as Takolḩasan-e Bālā) is a village in Jazmurian Rural District, Jazmurian District, Rudbar-e Jonubi County, Kerman Province, Iran. At the 2006 census, its population was 338, in 73 families.
