= Noqsan-e Kapari =

Noqsan-e Kapari نقصان كپري
- Village
- Location within Iran
- Coordinates: 27°47′51″N 58°32′36″E
- Country: Iran
- Province: Kerman
- County: Rudbar-e Jonubi
- Bakhsh: Jazmurian
- Rural District: Jazmurian

Population (2006)
  - Total: 85
- Time zone: UTC+3:30 (IRST)
  - Summer (DST): UTC+4:30 (IRDT)

Noqsan-e Kapari (Persian: نقصان كپري, also Romanized as Noqşān-e Kaparī) is a village in Jazmurian Rural District, Jazmurian District, Rudbar-e Jonubi County, Kerman Province, Iran. At the 2006 census, its population was 85, in 16 families.
