= Tareh-ye Ahrar Abbasabad Molla Reza =

Tareh-ye Ahrar Abbasabad Molla Reza طرح احرارعباس آباد ملارضا
- Village
- Country: Iran
- Province: Kerman
- County: Rudbar-e Jonubi
- Bakhsh: Central
- Rural District: Nehzatabad

Population (2006)
  - Total: 1,148
- Time zone: UTC+3:30 (IRST)
  - Summer (DST): UTC+4:30 (IRDT)

Tareh-ye Ahrar Abbasabad Molla Reza (Persian: طرح احرارعباس آباد ملارضا, also Romanized as Ţareḥ-ye Āḥrār ʿAbbāsābād Mollā Rez̤ā) is a village in Nehzatabad Rural District, in the Central District of Rudbar-e Jonubi County, Kerman Province, Iran. At the 2006 census, its population was 1,148, in 228 families.
