= Kal Karimi =

Kal Karimi كل كرمي
- Village
- Location within Iran
- Coordinates: 28°05′41″N 58°08′38″E
- Country: Iran
- Province: Kerman
- County: Rudbar-e Jonubi
- Bakhsh: Central
- Rural District: Rudbar

Population (2006)
  - Total: 521
- Time zone: UTC+3:30 (IRST)
  - Summer (DST): UTC+4:30 (IRDT)

Kal Karimi (Persian: كل كرمي, also Romanized as Kal Karīmī) is a village in Rudbar Rural District, in the Central District of Rudbar-e Jonubi County, Kerman Province, Iran. At the 2006 census, its population was 521, in 105 families.
