= Chah-e hasan, Jazmurian =

Village in Kerman province, Iran

Chah-e Hasan Persian: چاه حسن
- Village
- Location within Iran
- Coordinates: 27°50′40″N 58°19′19″E
- Country: Iran
- Province: Kerman
- County: Jazmurian
- District: Chah-e Hasan
- Rural District: Chah-e Hasan
- Time zone: UTC+3:30 (IRST)

Chah-e Hasan (Persian: چاه حسن (جازموریان)) is a village in, and the capital of, Chah-e Hasan Rural District of Chah-e Hasan District, Jazmurian County, Kerman province, Iran.

== population ==
According to the General Population and Housing Census (2015), the population of this village was 2,304 people (621 households).
