= Dazan, Kerman =

Dazan دازان
- Village
- Location within Iran
- Coordinates: 28°03′17″N 58°55′11″E
- Country: Iran
- Province: Kerman
- County: Rudbar-e Jonubi
- Bakhsh: Jazmurian
- Rural District: Kuhestan

Population (2006)
  - Total: 466
- Time zone: UTC+3:30 (IRST)
  - Summer (DST): UTC+4:30 (IRDT)

Dazan (Persian: دازان, also Romanized as Dāzān) is a village in Kuhestan Rural District, Jazmurian District, Rudbar-e Jonubi County, Kerman Province, Iran. At the 2006 census, its population was 466, in 91 families.
