= Gazbar, Rudbar-e Jonubi =

Gazbar گازبر
- Village
- Location within Iran
- Coordinates: 27°57′46″N 58°40′04″E
- Country: Iran
- Province: Kerman
- County: Rudbar-e Jonubi
- Bakhsh: Jazmurian
- Rural District: Kuhestan

Population (2006)
  - Total: 26
- Time zone: UTC+3:30 (IRST)
  - Summer (DST): UTC+4:30 (IRDT)

Gazbar (Persian: گازبر, also Romanized as Gāzbar) is a village in Kuhestan Rural District, Jazmurian District, Rudbar-e Jonubi County, Kerman Province, Iran. At the 2006 census, its population was 26, in 5 families.
