= Hana, Rudbar-e Jonubi =

Village in Kerman province, Iran

Hana Persian: حنا
- Village
- Location within Iran
- Coordinates: 27°54′04″N 58°08′48″E
- Country: Iran
- Province: Kerman
- County: Rudbar-e Jonubi
- District: Halil Dasht
- Rural District: Nehzatabad

Population (2016)
  - Total: 969
- Time zone: UTC+3:30 (IRST)

Hana (Persian: حنا) (Note: Formerly Mowtowr-e Shomareh-ye Yek Shahabad (موتورشماره 1شاه اباد)) is a village in Nehzatabad Rural District of Halil Dasht District, Rudbar-e Jonubi County, Kerman province, Iran, serving as capital of the district.

== Demographics ==
=== Population ===
At the time of the 2006 National Census, the village's population was 1,349 in 268 households, when it was in the Central District. The following census in 2011 counted 1,070 people in 243 households. The 2016 census measured the population of the village as 969 people in 247 households.

In 2023, the rural district was separated from the district in the establishment of Halil Dasht District.
