= Kalatang =

Village in Kerman province, Iran

Kalatang Persian: كلاتنگ
- Village
- Location within Iran
- Coordinates: 27°49′34″N 58°20′45″E
- Country: Iran
- Province: Kerman
- County: Jazmurian
- District: Central
- Rural District: Jazmurian

Population (2016)
  - Total: 2,304
- Time zone: UTC+3:30 (IRST)

Kalatang (Persian: كلاتنگ) (Note: Also romanized as Kalātang) is a village in Jazmurian Rural District of the Central District (Note: Formerly Jazmurian District of Rudbar-e Jonubi County) of Jazmurian County, Kerman province, Iran.

== Demographics ==
=== Population ===
At the time of the 2006 National Census, the village's population was 143 in 29 households, when it was in Jazmurian District (Note: Renamed the Central District of Jazmurian County) of Rudbar-e Jonubi County. The following census in 2011 counted 3,031 people in 704 households. The 2016 census measured the population of the village as 2,304 people in 621 households. It was the most populous village in its rural district.

In 2023, the district was separated from the county in the establishment of Jazmurian County and renamed the Central District.
