= Mandusat Kashteh =

Mandusat Kashteh من دوست كشته
- Village
- Interactive map of Mandusat Kashteh
- Country: Iran
- Province: Kerman
- County: Rudbar-e Jonubi
- Bakhsh: Central
- Rural District: Nehzatabad

Population (2006)
  - Total: 96
- Time zone: UTC+3:30 (IRST)
  - Summer (DST): UTC+4:30 (IRDT)

Mandusat Kashteh (Persian: من دوست كشته, also Romanized as Mandūsat Kashteh) is a village in Nehzatabad Rural District, in the Central District of Rudbar-e Jonubi County, Kerman province, Iran. At the 2006 census, its population was 96, in 22 families.
