= Daryanil =

Daryanil دريانيل
- Village
- Location within Iran
- Coordinates: 28°02′55″N 58°14′28″E
- Country: Iran
- Province: Kerman
- County: Rudbar-e Jonubi
- Bakhsh: Jazmurian
- Rural District: Kuhestan

Population (2006)
  - Total: 22
- Time zone: UTC+3:30 (IRST)
  - Summer (DST): UTC+4:30 (IRDT)

Daryanil (Persian: دريانيل, also Romanized as Daryānīl) is a village in Kuhestan Rural District, Jazmurian District, Rudbar-e Jonubi County, Kerman Province, Iran. At the 2006 census, its population was 22, in 5 families.
