= Rustai-ye Mosteza Afan =

Rustai-ye Mosteza Afan روستاي مستضعفان
- Village
- Interactive map of Rustai-ye Mosteza Afan
- Country: Iran
- Province: Kerman
- County: Rudbar-e Jonubi
- Bakhsh: Central
- Rural District: Rudbar

Population (2006)
  - Total: 117
- Time zone: UTC+3:30 (IRST)
  - Summer (DST): UTC+4:30 (IRDT)

Rustai-ye Mosteza Afan (Persian: روستاي مستضعفان, also Romanized as Rūstāī-ye Mostez̤a ʿAfān) is a village in Rudbar Rural District, in the Central District of Rudbar-e Jonubi County, Kerman Province, Iran. At the 2006 census, its population was 117, in 26 families.
