= Hushfat =

Hushfat هوشفت
- Village
- Location within Iran
- Coordinates: 28°11′08″N 58°35′57″E
- Country: Iran
- Province: Kerman
- County: Rudbar-e Jonubi
- Bakhsh: Jazmurian
- Rural District: Kuhestan

Population (2006)
  - Total: 19
- Time zone: UTC+3:30 (IRST)
  - Summer (DST): UTC+4:30 (IRDT)

Hushfat (Persian: هوشفت, also Romanized as Hūshfat) is a village in Kuhestan Rural District, Jazmurian District, Rudbar-e Jonubi County, Kerman Province, Iran. At the 2006 census, its population was 19, in 4 families.
