= Siah Kahur =

Siah Kahur سياه کهور
- Village
- Location within Iran
- Coordinates: 27°59′03″N 58°05′30″E
- Country: Iran
- Province: Kerman
- County: Rudbar-e Jonubi
- Bakhsh: Central
- Rural District: Rudbar

Population (2006)
  - Total: 155
- Time zone: UTC+3:30 (IRST)
  - Summer (DST): UTC+4:30 (IRDT)

Siah Kahur (Persian: سياه کهور, also Romanized as Sīāh Kahūr) is a village in Rudbar Rural District, in the Central District of Rudbar-e Jonubi County, Kerman Province, Iran. At the 2006 census, its population was 155, in 30 families.
