= Gavcharan =

Gavcharan گاوچهاران
- Village
- Location within Iran
- Coordinates: 28°02′56″N 58°48′57″E
- Country: Iran
- Province: Kerman
- County: Rudbar-e Jonubi
- Bakhsh: Jazmurian
- Rural District: Jazmurian

Population (2006)
  - Total: 189
- Time zone: UTC+3:30 (IRST)
  - Summer (DST): UTC+4:30 (IRDT)

Gavcharan (Persian: گاوچهاران, also Romanized as Gāvcharān) is a village in Jazmurian Rural District, Jazmurian District, Rudbar-e Jonubi County, Kerman Province, Iran. At the 2006 census, its population was 189, in 33 families.
