= Chah Dasht-e Buheng =

Chah Dasht-e Buheng چاه دشت بوهنگ
- Village
- Location within Iran
- Coordinates: 27°49′10″N 58°24′47″E
- Country: Iran
- Province: Kerman
- County: Rudbar-e Jonubi
- Bakhsh: Jazmurian
- Rural District: Jazmurian

Population (2006)
  - Total: 1,235
- Time zone: UTC+3:30 (IRST)
  - Summer (DST): UTC+4:30 (IRDT)

Chah Dasht-e Buheng (Persian: چاه دشت بوهنگ, also Romanized as Chāh Dasht-e Būheng; also known as Chāh Dasht-e Bavīng) is a village in Jazmurian Rural District, Jazmurian District, Rudbar-e Jonubi County, Kerman Province, Iran. At the 2006 census, its population was 1,235, in 234 families.
