= Kahn-e Cheragh =

Kahn-e Cheragh كهن چراغ
- Village
- Location within Iran
- Coordinates: 28°02′55″N 58°03′07″E
- Country: Iran
- Province: Kerman
- County: Rudbar-e Jonubi
- Bakhsh: Central
- Rural District: Rudbar

Population (2006)
  - Total: 593
- Time zone: UTC+3:30 (IRST)
  - Summer (DST): UTC+4:30 (IRDT)

Kahn-e Cheragh (Persian: كهن چراغ, also Romanized as Kahn-e Cherāgh) is a village in Rudbar Rural District, in the Central District of Rudbar-e Jonubi County, Kerman Province, Iran. At the 2006 census, its population was 593, in 137 families.
