= Chah-e Ali, Rudbar-e Jonubi =

Village in Kerman province, Iran

Chah-e Ali Persian: چاه علی
- Village
- Location within Iran
- Country: Iran
- Province: Kerman
- County: Rudbar-e Jonubi
- District: Halil Dasht
- Rural District: Nehzatabad

Population (2016)
  - Total: 1,735
- Time zone: UTC+3:30 (IRST)

Chah-e Ali (Persian: چاه علی) is a village in Nehzatabad Rural District of Halil Dasht District, Rudbar-e Jonubi County, Kerman province, Iran.

== Demographics ==
=== Population ===
At the time of the 2006 National Census, the village's population was 2,055 in 451 households, when it was in the Central District. The following census in 2011 counted 1,784 people in 418 households. The 2016 census measured the population of the village as 1,735 people in 405 households. It was the most populous village in its rural district.

In 2023, the rural district was separated from the district in the formation of Halil Dasht District.
