= Panag =

Panag پنگ
- Village
- Location within Iran
- Coordinates: 27°41′47″N 58°53′29″E
- Country: Iran
- Province: Kerman
- County: Rudbar-e Jonubi
- Bakhsh: Jazmurian
- Rural District: Jazmurian

Population (2006)
  - Total: 2,743
- Time zone: UTC+3:30 (IRST)
  - Summer (DST): UTC+4:30 (IRDT)

Panag (Persian: پنگ) is a village in Jazmurian Rural District, Jazmurian District, Rudbar-e Jonubi County, Kerman Province, Iran. At the 2006 census, its population was 2,743, in 533 families.
