= Chan Taki =

Chan Taki چنتكي
- Village
- Location within Iran
- Coordinates: 28°05′43″N 58°35′02″E
- Country: Iran
- Province: Kerman
- County: Rudbar-e Jonubi
- Bakhsh: Jazmurian
- Rural District: Kuhestan

Population (2006)
  - Total: 75
- Time zone: UTC+3:30 (IRST)
  - Summer (DST): UTC+4:30 (IRDT)

Chan Taki (Persian: چنتكي, also Romanized as Chan Takī; also known as Cham Takī) is a village in Kuhestan Rural District, Jazmurian District, Rudbar-e Jonubi County, Kerman Province, Iran. At the 2006 census, its population was 75, in 14 families.
