= Mojtame-ye Chah Molla =

Mojtame-ye Chah Molla مجتمع چاه ملا
- Village
- Interactive map of Mojtame-ye Chah Molla
- Country: Iran
- Province: Kerman
- County: Rudbar-e Jonubi
- Bakhsh: Central
- Rural District: Rudbar

Population (2006)
  - Total: 336
- Time zone: UTC+3:30 (IRST)
  - Summer (DST): UTC+4:30 (IRDT)

Mojtame-ye Chah Molla (Persian: مجتمع چاه ملا, also Romanized as Mojtame`-ye Chāh Mollā) is a village in Rudbar Rural District, in the Central District of Rudbar-e Jonubi County, Kerman Province, Iran. At the 2006 census, its population was 336, in 79 families.
