= Rustai-ye Solmaniyeh =

Rustai-ye Solmaniyeh روستاي سلمانيه
- Village
- Interactive map of Rustai-ye Solmaniyeh
- Country: Iran
- Province: Kerman
- County: Rudbar-e Jonubi
- Bakhsh: Central
- Rural District: Rudbar

Population (2006)
  - Total: 1,646
- Time zone: UTC+3:30 (IRST)
  - Summer (DST): UTC+4:30 (IRDT)

Rustai-ye Solmaniyeh (Persian: روستاي سلمانيه, also Romanized as Rūstāī-ye Solmānīyeh) is a village in Rudbar Rural District, in the Central District of Rudbar-e Jonubi County, Kerman Province, Iran. At the 2006 census, its population was 1,646, in 317 families.
