= Mil Saidi =

Mil Saidi ميل سعيدي
- Village
- Location within Iran
- Coordinates: 27°55′59″N 58°35′37″E
- Country: Iran
- Province: Kerman
- County: Rudbar-e Jonubi
- Bakhsh: Jazmurian
- Rural District: Jazmurian

Population (2006)
  - Total: 62
- Time zone: UTC+3:30 (IRST)
  - Summer (DST): UTC+4:30 (IRDT)

Mil Saidi (Persian: ميل سعيدي, also Romanized as Mīl Sa‘īdī; also known as Mīr Sa‘īdī) is a village in Jazmurian Rural District, Jazmurian District, Rudbar-e Jonubi County, Kerman Province, Iran. At the 2006 census, its population was 62, in 12 families.
