= Bizhanabad-e Sofla =

Bizhanabad-e Sofla (Persian: بيژن آبادسفلي) may refer to:

- Azizabad, Rudbar-e Jonubi
- Bizhanabad-e Do
