= Maskhareh =

Maskhareh مسخره
- Village
- Location within Iran
- Coordinates: 27°50′35″N 58°00′24″E
- Country: Iran
- Province: Kerman
- County: Rudbar-e Jonubi
- Bakhsh: Central
- Rural District: Nehzatabad

Population (2006)
  - Total: 127
- Time zone: UTC+3:30 (IRST)
  - Summer (DST): UTC+4:30 (IRDT)

Maskhareh (Persian: مسخره; also known as Maskareh) is a village in Nehzatabad Rural District, in the Central District of Rudbar-e Jonubi County, Kerman Province, Iran. At the 2006 census, its population was 127, in 22 families.
