= Mokhtarabad, Rudbar-e Jonubi =

Mokhtarabad مختاراباد
- Village
- Location within Iran
- Coordinates: 28°02′34″N 57°51′59″E
- Country: Iran
- Province: Kerman
- County: Rudbar-e Jonubi
- Bakhsh: Central
- Rural District: Rudbar

Population (2006)
  - Total: 1,525
- Time zone: UTC+3:30 (IRST)
  - Summer (DST): UTC+4:30 (IRDT)

Mokhtarabad (Persian: مختاراباد, also Romanized as Mokhtārābād; also known as Mokhtar Abad Hoomeh) is a village in Rudbar Rural District, in the Central District of Rudbar-e Jonubi County, Kerman Province, Iran. At the 2006 census, its population was 1,525, in 295 families.
