= Bizhanabad-e Yek =

Village in Kerman province, Iran

Bizhanabad-e Yek Persian: بيژن آباد1
- Village
- Location within Iran
- Coordinates: 27°57′04″N 58°01′01″E
- Country: Iran
- Province: Kerman
- County: Rudbar-e Jonubi
- District: Central
- Rural District: Bizhanabad

Population (2016)
  - Total: 1,140
- Time zone: UTC+3:30 (IRST)

Bizhanabad-e Yek (Persian: بيژن آباد1) (Note: Also romanized as Bīzhanābād-e Yek; also known as Bīzhanābād-e ‘Olyā) is a village in, and the capital of, Bizhanabad Rural District of the Central District of Rudbar-e Jonubi County, Kerman province, Iran.

== Demographics ==
=== Population ===
At the time of the 2006 National Census, the village's population was 1,180 in 253 households, when it was in Rudbar Rural District. The following census in 2011 counted 1,294 people in 331 households. The 2016 census measured the population of the village as 1,140 people in 312 households.

The village was transferred to the new Bizhanabad Rural District of the Central District in 2023.
