= Takolabad =

Takolabad تكل اباد
- Village
- Location within Iran
- Coordinates: 27°44′51″N 58°20′38″E
- Country: Iran
- Province: Kerman
- County: Rudbar-e Jonubi
- Bakhsh: Jazmurian
- Rural District: Jazmurian

Population (2006)
  - Total: 225
- Time zone: UTC+3:30 (IRST)
  - Summer (DST): UTC+4:30 (IRDT)

Takolabad (Persian: تكل اباد, also Romanized as Takolābād; also known as Takol, Tavakkolābād, Tavakkolābād-e Kahnūj, and Tavakkol Abad Kahnooj) is a village in Jazmurian Rural District, Jazmurian District, Rudbar-e Jonubi County, Kerman Province, Iran. At the 2006 census, its population was 225, in 45 families.
