= Nehzatabad, Rudbar-e Jonubi =

Village in Kerman province, Iran

Nehzatabad Persian: نهضت اباد
- Village
- Location within Iran
- Coordinates: 27°53′12″N 58°10′11″E
- Country: Iran
- Province: Kerman
- County: Rudbar-e Jonubi
- District: Halil Dasht
- Rural District: Nehzatabad

Population (2016)
  - Total: 587
- Time zone: UTC+3:30 (IRST)

Nehzatabad (Persian: نهضت اباد) (Note: Also romanized as Nehẕatābād; also known as Shāhābād) is a village in Nehzatabad Rural District of Halil Dasht District, Rudbar-e Jonubi County, Kerman province, Iran, serving as capital of both the district and the rural district.

== Demographics ==
=== Population ===
At the time of the 2006 National Census, the village's population was 785 in 149 households, when it was in the Central District. The following census in 2011 counted 546 people in 129 households. The 2016 census measured the population of the village as 587 people in 149 households.

In 2023, the rural district was separated from the district in the formation of Halil Dasht District.
