= Sabz Gezi =

Sabz Gezi or Sabz Gazi (Persian: سبزگزي) may refer to:

- Sabz Gezi, Anbarabad
- Sabz Gazi, Rudbar-e Jonubi
