= Jazmurian =

Jazmurian (Persian: جازموریان) may refer to:

- Jazmurian County
- Jazmurian Rural District
