= Shahshiri =

Shahshiri شه شيري
- Village
- Location within Iran
- Coordinates: 28°07′55″N 58°46′39″E
- Country: Iran
- Province: Kerman
- County: Rudbar-e Jonubi
- Bakhsh: Jazmurian
- Rural District: Kuhestan

Population (2006)
  - Total: 87
- Time zone: UTC+3:30 (IRST)
  - Summer (DST): UTC+4:30 (IRDT)

Shahshiri (Persian: شه شيري, also Romanized as Shahshīrī; also known as Shamshīrī) is a village in Kuhestan Rural District, Jazmurian District, Rudbar-e Jonubi County, Kerman Province, Iran. At the 2006 census, its population was 87, in 16 families.
