= Maskareh =

Maskareh (Persian: مسكره) may refer to:

- Maskareh, Kerman

== See also ==
- Masgareh
