= Shahbaba, Rudbar-e Jonubi =

Shahbaba شه بابا
- Village
- Location within Iran
- Coordinates: 27°59′26″N 57°51′22″E
- Country: Iran
- Province: Kerman
- County: Rudbar-e Jonubi
- Bakhsh: Central
- Rural District: Rudbar

Population (2006)
  - Total: 192
- Time zone: UTC+3:30 (IRST)
  - Summer (DST): UTC+4:30 (IRDT)

Shahbaba (Persian: شه بابا, also Romanized as Shahbābā) is a village in Rudbar Rural District, in the Central District of Rudbar-e Jonubi County, Kerman Province, Iran. At the 2006 census, its population was 192, in 38 families.
