= Taradeh =

Taradeh or Tarradeh (Persian: طراده) may refer to:

- Taradeh, Nehzatabad
- Tarradeh, Rudbar
