= Sabz Gazi, Rudbar-e Jonubi =

Sabz Gazi سبزگزي
- Village
- Country: Iran
- Province: Kerman
- County: Rudbar-e Jonubi
- Bakhsh: Jazmurian
- Rural District: Kuhestan

Population (2006)
  - Total: 11
- Time zone: UTC+3:30 (IRST)
  - Summer (DST): UTC+4:30 (IRDT)

Sabz Gazi (Persian: سبزگزي, also Romanized as Sabz Gazī) is a village in Kuhestan Rural District, Jazmurian District, Rudbar-e Jonubi County, Kerman Province, Iran. At the 2006 census, its population was 11, in 4 families.
