= Nehzatabad, Jazmurian =

Nehzatabad نهضت اباد
- Village
- Location within Iran
- Coordinates: 28°10′02″N 58°46′20″E
- Country: Iran
- Province: Kerman
- County: Rudbar-e Jonubi
- Bakhsh: Jazmurian
- Rural District: Kuhestan

Population (2006)
  - Total: 92
- Time zone: UTC+3:30 (IRST)
  - Summer (DST): UTC+4:30 (IRDT)

Nehzatabad (Persian: نهضت اباد, also Romanized as Nehẕatābād) is a village in Kuhestan Rural District, Jazmurian District, Rudbar-e Jonubi County, Kerman Province, Iran. At the 2006 census, its population was 92, in 19 families.
