= Surgan-e Sofla =

Surgan-e Sofla سورگان سفلي
- Village
- Location within Iran
- Coordinates: 27°40′38″N 58°08′36″E
- Country: Iran
- Province: Kerman
- County: Rudbar-e Jonubi
- Bakhsh: Central
- Rural District: Nehzatabad

Population (2006)
  - Total: 128
- Time zone: UTC+3:30 (IRST)
  - Summer (DST): UTC+4:30 (IRDT)

Surgan-e Sofla (Persian: سورگان سفلي, also Romanized as Sūrgān-e Soflá; also known as Sūrgāvan-e Soflá) is a village in Nehzatabad Rural District, in the Central District of Rudbar-e Jonubi County, Kerman Province, Iran. At the 2006 census, its population was 128, in 23 families.
