= Rigabad, Nehzatabad =

Rigabad ريگ اباد
- Village
- Location within Iran
- Coordinates: 27°45′19″N 58°03′37″E
- Country: Iran
- Province: Kerman
- County: Rudbar-e Jonubi
- Bakhsh: Central
- Rural District: Nehzatabad

Population (2006)
  - Total: 15
- Time zone: UTC+3:30 (IRST)
  - Summer (DST): UTC+4:30 (IRDT)

Rigabad (Persian: ريگ اباد, also Romanized as Rīgābād; also known as Rik Abad) is a village in Nehzatabad Rural District, in the Central District of Rudbar-e Jonubi County, Kerman Province, Iran. At the 2006 census, its population was 15, in 4 families.
