= Surgan-e Olya =

Surgan-e Olya سورگان عليا
- Village
- Location within Iran
- Coordinates: 27°40′32″N 58°09′46″E
- Country: Iran
- Province: Kerman
- County: Rudbar-e Jonubi
- Bakhsh: Central
- Rural District: Nehzatabad

Population (2006)
  - Total: 143
- Time zone: UTC+3:30 (IRST)
  - Summer (DST): UTC+4:30 (IRDT)

Surgan-e Olya (Persian: سورگان عليا, also Romanized as Sūrgān-e ‘Olyā; also known as Sūrgāvan-e ‘Olyā) is a village in Nehzatabad Rural District, in the Central District of Rudbar-e Jonubi County, Kerman Province, Iran. At the 2006 census, its population was 143, in 25 families.
