= Firuzabad, Rudbar-e Jonubi =

Village in Kerman province, Iran

Firuzabad Persian: فيروزاباد
- Village
- Location within Iran
- Coordinates: 28°05′01″N 57°55′41″E
- Country: Iran
- Province: Kerman
- County: Rudbar-e Jonubi
- District: Central
- Rural District: Rudbar

Population (2016)
  - Total: 1,359
- Time zone: UTC+3:30 (IRST)

Firuzabad (Persian: فيروزاباد) (Note: Also romanized as Fīrūzābād) is a village in, and the capital of, Rudbar Rural District of the Central District of Rudbar-e Jonubi County, Kerman province, Iran. The previous capital of the rural district was the village of Eslamabad.

== Demographics ==
=== Population ===
At the time of the 2006 National Census, the village's population was 606 in 126 households. The following census in 2011 counted 1,251 people in 318 households. The 2016 census measured the population of the village as 1,359 people in 392 households.
