= Shabib =

Shabib is a masculine given name and surname of Arabic origin. Notable people with the name include:

== Given name ==
- Shabib Jovijari (born 1967), Iranian politician
- Shabib ibn Abd Allah al-Nahshali (died 680), Arab Islamic martyr
- Shabib ibn Yazid al-Shaybani (646/47–697/98), Arab rebel

== Surname ==
- Kadhim Shabib (born 1952), Iraqi footballer
- Kamil Shabib (1895–1944), Iraqi military officer
- Laith Shabib (born 1968), Iraqi footballer
- Lina Shabib, Jordanian engineer and politician
- Maridah bint Shabib, Abbasid umm walad

== See also ==
- Shahbaba (disambiguation)
- Shebaba
- Shebib
- Shibobo
