= Suluiyeh, Rudbar-e Jonubi =

Suluiyeh سولوييه
- Village
- Location within Iran
- Coordinates: 28°01′00″N 57°58′00″E
- Country: Iran
- Province: Kerman
- County: Rudbar-e Jonubi
- Bakhsh: Central
- Rural District: Rudbar

Population (2006)
  - Total: 1,544
- Time zone: UTC+3:30 (IRST)
  - Summer (DST): UTC+4:30 (IRDT)

Suluiyeh (Persian: سولوييه, also Romanized as Sūlū’īyeh and Şūlū’īyeh) is a village in Rudbar Rural District, in the Central District of Rudbar-e Jonubi County, Kerman Province, Iran. At the 2006 census, its population was 1,544, in 333 families.
