= Surgan (disambiguation) =

Surgan is a village in Sistan and Baluchestan Province, Iran.

Surgan (Persian: سورگان), also rendered as Surgavan, may also refer to:

- Surgan-e Olya, Kerman Province
- Surgan-e Sofla, Kerman Province
