= Abuzariyeh =

Abuzariyeh (Persian: ابوذريه) may refer to:

- Abuzariyeh, Jiroft
- Abuzariyeh, Rudbar-e Jonubi
