= Saidabad, Rudbar-e Jonubi =

Saidabad سعيداباد
- Village
- Location within Iran
- Coordinates: 27°57′13″N 58°00′56″E
- Country: Iran
- Province: Kerman
- County: Rudbar-e Jonubi
- Bakhsh: Central
- Rural District: Rudbar

Population (2006)
  - Total: 1,436
- Time zone: UTC+3:30 (IRST)
  - Summer (DST): UTC+4:30 (IRDT)

Saidabad (Persian: سعيداباد, also Romanized as Sa‘īdābād; also known as Bīzhanābād-e Vosţá) is a village in Rudbar Rural District, in the Central District of Rudbar-e Jonubi County, Kerman Province, Iran. At the 2006 census, its population was 1,436, in 291 families.
