= Qasemabad, Rudbar-e Jonubi =

Village in Kerman province, Iran

Qasemabad Persian: قاسم اباد
- Village
- Location within Iran
- Coordinates: 28°04′32″N 57°56′50″E
- Country: Iran
- Province: Kerman
- County: Rudbar-e Jonubi
- District: Central
- Rural District: Rudbar

Population (2016)
  - Total: 1,625
- Time zone: UTC+3:30 (IRST)

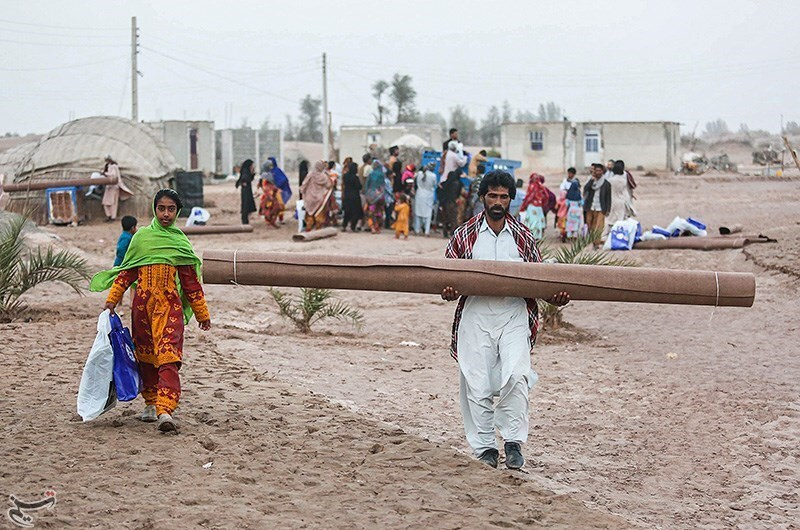
Qasemabad, 2022

Qasemabad (Persian: قاسم اباد) (Note: Also romanized as Qāsemābād) is a village in Rudbar Rural District of the Central District of Rudbar-e Jonubi County, Kerman province, Iran.

== Demographics ==
=== Population ===
At the time of the 2006 National Census, the village's population was 1,059 in 236 households. The following census in 2011 counted 1,437 people in 357 households. The 2016 census measured the population of the village as 1,625 people in 441 households. It was the most populous village in its rural district.
