= Chahaki =

Chahaki (Persian: چاهكي) may refer to:

- Chahaki, Fars
- Chahaki, Kerman
