= Motaharabad =

Motaharabad (Persian: مطهراباد) may refer to:

- Motaharabad, Rudbar-e Jonubi
- Motaharabad, Zarand
