= Shamshiri =

Shamshiri (Persian: شم شيري) may refer to:

- Shamshiri, Bushehr
- Shamshiri, Kerman
