= Abuzariyeh, Rudbar-e Jonubi =

Abuzariyeh ابوذريه
- Village
- Location within Iran
- Coordinates: 28°03′24″N 57°54′03″E
- Country: Iran
- Province: Kerman
- County: Rudbar-e Jonubi
- Bakhsh: Central
- Rural District: Rudbar

Population (2006)
  - Total: 278
- Time zone: UTC+3:30 (IRST)
  - Summer (DST): UTC+4:30 (IRDT)

Abuzariyeh (Persian: ابوذريه, also Romanized as Abūẕarīyeh; also known as Abūz̄arābād, Kahūr Moshkak, Kūramshakak, and Kūr-e Moshkak) is a village in Rudbar Rural District, in the Central District of Rudbar-e Jonubi County, Kerman Province, Iran. At the 2006 census, its population was 278, in 56 families.
