= Tavakkolabad, Bam =

Tavakkolabad توكل اباد
- Village
- Location within Iran
- Coordinates: 29°00′33″N 58°02′47″E
- Country: Iran
- Province: Kerman
- County: Bam
- Bakhsh: Central
- Rural District: Howmeh

Population (2006)
  - Total: 50
- Time zone: UTC+3:30 (IRST)
  - Summer (DST): UTC+4:30 (IRDT)

Tavakkolabad (Persian: توكل اباد, also Romanized as Tavakkolābād) is a village in Howmeh Rural District, in the Central District of Bam County, Kerman Province, Iran. At the 2006 census, its population was 50, in 18 families.

== See also ==
- Suluiyeh, Rudbar-e Jonubi
- Rudbar
- Dasht-e Mehran
