= Bizhanabad-e Do =

Bizhanabad-e Do بيژن آباد2
- Village
- Location within Iran
- Coordinates: 27°55′43″N 58°03′07″E
- Country: Iran
- Province: Kerman
- County: Rudbar-e Jonubi
- Bakhsh: Central
- Rural District: Rudbar

Population (2006)
  - Total: 1,092
- Time zone: UTC+3:30 (IRST)
  - Summer (DST): UTC+4:30 (IRDT)

Bizhanabad-e Do (Persian: بيژن آباد2, also Romanized as Bīzhanābād-e Do; also known as Bīzhanābād-e Soflá) is a village in Rudbar Rural District, in the Central District of Rudbar-e Jonubi County, Kerman Province, Iran. At the 2006 census, its population was 1,092, in 226 families.
