= Shahbaba =

Shahbaba (Persian: شه بابا) may refer to:

- Shahbaba, Rudbar-e Jonubi
- Shahbaba, Jazmurian, Rudbar-e Jonubi County
