= Abbasabad Rural District =

Rural district in Kerman province, Iran

Abbasabad Rural District Persian: دهستان عباس‌آباد
- Rural District
- Location within Iran
- Coordinates: 27°45′51″N 58°03′40″E
- Country: Iran
- Province: Kerman
- County: Rudbar-e Jonubi
- District: Halil Dasht
- Capital: Miri-ye Khani-ye Yek
- Time zone: UTC+3:30 (IRST)

Abbasabad Rural District (Persian: دهستان عباس‌آباد) is in Halil Dasht District of Rudbar-e Jonubi County, Kerman province, Iran. Its capital is the village of Miri-ye Khani-ye Yek, whose population at the time of the 2016 National Census was 549 in 134 households.

== History ==
In 2023, Nehzatabad Rural District was separated from the Central District in the establishment of Halil Dasht District, and Abbasabad Rural District was created in the new district.
