= Boeing Rural District =

Rural district in Kerman province, Iran

Boeing Rural District Persian: دهستان بوینگ
- Rural District
- Location within Iran
- Coordinates: 27°46′36″N 58°26′41″E
- Country: Iran
- Province: Kerman
- County: Jazmurian
- District: Central
- Capital: Boeing
- Time zone: UTC+3:30 (IRST)

Boeing Rural District (Persian: دهستان بوینگ) is in the Central District (Note: Formerly Jazmurian District of Rudbar-e Jonubi County) of Jazmurian County, Kerman province, Iran. Its capital is the village of Boeing, whose population at the time of the 2016 National Census was 1,757 in 461 households.

== History ==
In 2023, Jazmurian District (Note: Renamed the Central District of Jazmurian County) was separated from Rudbar-e Jonubi County in the establishment of Jazmurian County and renamed the Central District. Boeing Rural District was created in the district.
