= Tavakkolabad, Rudbar-e Jonubi =

Tavakkolabad توكل اباد
- Village
- Location within Iran
- Coordinates: 28°02′10″N 57°58′25″E
- Country: Iran
- Province: Kerman
- County: Rudbar-e Jonubi
- Bakhsh: Central
- Rural District: Rudbar

Population (2006)
  - Total: 46
- Time zone: UTC+3:30 (IRST)
  - Summer (DST): UTC+4:30 (IRDT)

Tavakkolabad (Persian: توكل اباد, also Romanized as Tavakkolābād; also known as Moţaharābād) is a village in Rudbar Rural District, in the Central District of Rudbar-e Jonubi County, Kerman Province, Iran. At the 2006 census, its population was 46, in 9 families.
