= Abuzarabad =

Abuzarabad (Persian: ابوذر اباد) may refer to:

- Abuzarabad, Fars
- Abuzarabad, Kerman
- Abuzarabad, Lorestan
