= Motahar =

Motahar (Arabic: مطهر) is a masculine given name of Arabic origin. Notable people with the name include:

- Motahar Rashad al-Masri, Yemeni politician and former government minister
- Motahar Uddin Ahmed Hawladar (1935–1974), Bangladeshi politician

== Derivations ==
- Motahar Hossain (disambiguation), multiple people
- Motaherul Islam Chowdhury (born 1949), Bangladeshi politician
- Motahhar (disambiguation) and Motaharabad (disambiguation)
