= Motahar Hossain =

Motahar Hossain (Bengali: মোতাহার হোসেন) is a Bengali masculine given name of Arabic origin. It may refer to:

- Qazi Motahar Hossain (1897-1981), Bangladeshi author, scientist, statistician, chess player, and journalist
- Motaher Hussain Chowdhury (1903–1956), Bengali writer and educationist
- Sufi Motahar Hossein (1907-1975), Bangladeshi poet
- Motahar Hossain Talukdar (1922-2001), Bangladeshi politician
- Dr. Motahar Hossain (1932-2011), Home Minister of State for West Bengal
- Motahar Hossain (born 1948), Bangladeshi former minister
- Chowdhury Motahar Hossain, Bangladeshi politician

== See also ==
- Motahar
- Husayn
