= Rudbar, Kerman =

City in Kerman province, Iran

Rudbar Persian: رودبار
- City
- Location within Iran
- Coordinates: 28°01′39″N 57°59′51″E
- Country: Iran
- Province: Kerman
- County: Rudbar-e Jonubi
- District: Central

Population (2016)
  - Total: 14,747
- Time zone: UTC+3:30 (IRST)

Rudbar (Persian: رودبار) (Note: Also romanized as Rūdbar) is a city in the Central District of Rudbar-e Jonubi County, Kerman province, Iran, serving as capital of both the county and the district.

== Demographics ==
=== Population ===
At the time of the 2006 National Census, the city's population was 8,275 in 1,677 households. The following census in 2011 counted 12,223 people in 2,818 households. The 2016 census measured the population of the city as 14,747 people in 3,783 households.
