= Azizabad, Rudbar-e Jonubi =

Azizabad عزيزاباد
- Village
- Location within Iran
- Coordinates: 27°55′49″N 58°03′04″E
- Country: Iran
- Province: Kerman
- County: Rudbar-e Jonubi
- Bakhsh: Central
- Rural District: Nehzatabad

Population (2006)
  - Total: 124
- Time zone: UTC+3:30 (IRST)
  - Summer (DST): UTC+4:30 (IRDT)

Azizabad (Persian: عزيزاباد, also Romanized as ‘Azīzābād; also known as Bīzhanābād-e Soflá) is a village in Nehzatabad Rural District, in the Central District of Rudbar-e Jonubi County, Kerman Province, Iran. At the 2006 census, its population was 124, in 27 families.
