= Rigabad, Eskelabad =

Rigabad ريگ اباد
- Village
- Location within Iran
- Coordinates: 28°19′16″N 60°27′12″E
- Country: Iran
- Province: Sistan and Baluchestan
- County: Khash
- Bakhsh: Nukabad
- Rural District: Eskelabad

Population (2006)
  - Total: 46
- Time zone: UTC+3:30 (IRST)
  - Summer (DST): UTC+4:30 (IRDT)

Rigabad (Persian: ريگ اباد, also Romanized as Rīgābād) is a village in Eskelabad Rural District, Nukabad District, Khash County, Sistan and Baluchestan Province, Iran. At the 2006 census, its population was 46, in 11 families.
