= Nehzatabad, Khuzestan =

Nehzatabad نهضت اباد
- Village
- Country: Iran
- Province: Khuzestan
- County: Dezful
- Bakhsh: Choghamish
- Rural District: Kheybar

Population (2006)
  - Total: 515
- Time zone: UTC+3:30 (IRST)
  - Summer (DST): UTC+4:30 (IRDT)

Nehzatabad (Persian: نهضت اباد, also Romanized as Nehz̤atābād) is a village in Kheybar Rural District, Choghamish District, Dezful County, Khuzestan Province, Iran. At the 2006 census, its population was 515, in 97 families.
