= Azizabad-e Qeytasvand =

Azizabad-e Qeytasvand عزيزابادقطاسوند
- Village
- Location within Iran
- Coordinates: 33°17′38″N 49°29′08″E
- Country: Iran
- Province: Lorestan
- County: Azna
- Bakhsh: Central
- Rural District: Pachehlak-e Gharbi

Population (2006)
  - Total: 154
- Time zone: UTC+3:30 (IRST)
  - Summer (DST): UTC+4:30 (IRDT)

Azizabad-e Qeytasvand (Persian: عزيزابادقطاسوند, also Romanized as ‘Azīzābād-e Qeytāsvand; also known as ‘Azīzābād (Persian: عزيز آباد) and Deh Bozorg) is a village in Pachehlak-e Gharbi Rural District, in the Central District of Azna County, Lorestan Province, Iran. At the 2006 census, its population was 154, in 22 families.
