= Rigabad, Bardsir =

Rigabad ريگ اباد
- Village
- Location within Iran
- Coordinates: 29°52′11″N 56°58′24″E
- Country: Iran
- Province: Kerman
- County: Bardsir
- Bakhsh: Central
- Rural District: Negar

Population (2006)
  - Total: 47
- Time zone: UTC+3:30 (IRST)
  - Summer (DST): UTC+4:30 (IRDT)

Rigabad (Persian: ريگ اباد, also Romanized as Rīgābād) is a village in Negar Rural District, in the Central District of Bardsir County, Kerman Province, Iran. At the 2006 census, its population was 47, in 12 families.
