= Masgareh =

Masgareh مسگره
- Village
- Location within Iran
- Coordinates: 33°56′50″N 47°10′15″E
- Country: Iran
- Province: Kermanshah
- County: Kermanshah
- Bakhsh: Firuzabad
- Rural District: Osmanvand

Population (2006)
  - Total: 100
- Time zone: UTC+3:30 (IRST)
  - Summer (DST): UTC+4:30 (IRDT)

Masgareh (Persian: مسگره; also known as Qal‘eh Mashkara) is a village in Osmanvand Rural District, Firuzabad District, Kermanshah County, Kermanshah Province, Iran. At the 2006 census, its population was 100, in 19 families.
