= Nehzatabad, Manujan =

Nehzatabad نهضت اباد
- Village
- Location within Iran
- Coordinates: 27°24′57″N 57°37′40″E
- Country: Iran
- Province: Kerman
- County: Manujan
- Bakhsh: Central
- Rural District: Qaleh

Population (2006)
  - Total: 447
- Time zone: UTC+3:30 (IRST)
  - Summer (DST): UTC+4:30 (IRDT)

Nehzatabad (Persian: نهضت اباد, also Romanized as Nehz̤atābād; also known as Nehz̤atābād-e Manūjān) is a village in Qaleh Rural District, in the Central District of Manujan County, Kerman Province, Iran. At the 2006 census, its population was 447, in 89 families.
