= Abuzariyeh, Jiroft =

Abuzariyeh ابوذريه
- Village
- Location within Iran
- Coordinates: 28°32′33″N 57°43′00″E
- Country: Iran
- Province: Kerman
- County: Jiroft
- Bakhsh: Central
- Rural District: Eslamabad

Population (2006)
  - Total: 630
- Time zone: UTC+3:30 (IRST)
  - Summer (DST): UTC+4:30 (IRDT)

Abuzariyeh (Persian: ابوذريه, also Romanized as Abūz̄arīyeh) is a village in Eslamabad Rural District, in the Central District of Jiroft County, Kerman Province, Iran. At the 2006 census, its population was 630, in 142 families.
