= Bizhanabad, South Khorasan =

Bizhanabad بيژن اباد
- Village
- Country: Iran
- Province: South Khorasan
- County: Birjand
- Bakhsh: Central
- Rural District: Baqeran

Population (2006)
  - Total: 61
- Time zone: UTC+3:30 (IRST)
  - Summer (DST): UTC+4:30 (IRDT)

Bizhanabad (Persian: بيژن اباد, also Romanized as Bīzhanābād) is a village in Baqeran Rural District, in the Central District of Birjand County, South Khorasan Province, Iran. At the 2006 census, its population was 61, in 18 families.
