= Azizabad-e Bonavaj =

Azizabad-e Bonavaj عزيزابادبناوج
- Village
- Location within Iran
- Coordinates: 34°44′46″N 46°15′29″E
- Country: Iran
- Province: Kermanshah
- County: Salas-e Babajani
- Bakhsh: Central
- Rural District: Zamkan

Population (2006)
  - Total: 136
- Time zone: UTC+3:30 (IRST)
  - Summer (DST): UTC+4:30 (IRDT)

Azizabad-e Bonavaj (Persian: عزيزابادبناوج, also Romanized as ‘Azīzābād-e Bonāvaj; also known as ‘Azīzābād-e Lūsheh, Benāvch-e Lūsheh, Sheyān, and Shīān) is a village in Zamkan Rural District, in the Central District of Salas-e Babajani County, Kermanshah Province, Iran. At the 2006 census, its population was 136, in 29 families.
