= Motaharabad-e Tajabad =

Motaharabad-e Tajabad مطهراباد تاج اباد
- Village
- Location within Iran
- Coordinates: 30°45′26″N 56°37′23″E
- Country: Iran
- Province: Kerman
- County: Zarand
- Bakhsh: Central
- Rural District: Vahdat

Population (2006)
  - Total: 1,798
- Time zone: UTC+3:30 (IRST)
  - Summer (DST): UTC+4:30 (IRDT)

Motaharabad-e Tajabad (Persian: مطهراباد تاج اباد, also Romanized as Moţaharābād-e Tājābād; also known as Moţaharābād and Tājābād) is a village in Vahdat Rural District, in the Central District of Zarand County, Kerman Province, Iran. At the 2006 census, its population was 1,798, in 441 families.
