= Tavakkolabad-e Ranjabar =

Tavakkolabad-e Ranjabar توكل ابادرنجبر
- Village
- Location within Iran
- Coordinates: 30°15′15″N 56°32′19″E
- Country: Iran
- Province: Kerman
- County: Rafsanjan
- Bakhsh: Central
- Rural District: Kabutar Khan

Population (2006)
  - Total: 23
- Time zone: UTC+3:30 (IRST)
  - Summer (DST): UTC+4:30 (IRDT)

Tavakkolabad-e Ranjabar (Persian: توكل ابادرنجبر, also Romanized as Tavakkolābād-e Ranjabar; also known as Tavakkolābād) is a village in Kabutar Khan Rural District, in the Central District of Rafsanjan County, Kerman Province, Iran. At the 2006 census, its population was 23, in 4 families.
