= Azizabad, Javanrud =

Azizabad عزيزآباد
- Village
- Location within Iran
- Coordinates: 34°48′12″N 46°27′35″E
- Country: Iran
- Province: Kermanshah
- County: Javanrud
- Bakhsh: Central
- Rural District: Palanganeh

Population (2006)
  - Total: 82
- Time zone: UTC+3:30 (IRST)
  - Summer (DST): UTC+4:30 (IRDT)

Azizabad (Persian: عزيزآباد, Sorani Kurdish: عەزیز ئاوا, also Romanized as ‘Azīzābād) is a village in Palanganeh Rural District, in the Central District of Javanrud County, Kermanshah Province, Iran. At the 2006 census, its population was 82, in 18 families.
