= Azizabad-e Sofla =

Azizabad-e Sofla عزيزابادسفلي
- Village
- Location within Iran
- Coordinates: 31°58′20″N 50°24′16″E
- Country: Iran
- Province: Chaharmahal and Bakhtiari
- County: Ardal
- Bakhsh: Central
- Rural District: Dinaran

Population (2006)
  - Total: 368
- Time zone: UTC+3:30 (IRST)
  - Summer (DST): UTC+4:30 (IRDT)

Azizabad-e Sofla (Persian: عزيزابادسفلي, also Romanized as ‘Azīzābād-e Soflá; also known as ‘Azīzābād-e Pā’īn) is a village in Dinaran Rural District, in the Central District of Ardal County, Chaharmahal and Bakhtiari Province, Iran. At the 2006 census, its population was 368, in 86 families. The village is populated by Lurs.
