= Azizabad, Saveh =

Azizabad عزيزاباد
- Village
- Location within Iran
- Coordinates: 35°03′28″N 50°05′01″E
- Country: Iran
- Province: Markazi
- County: Saveh
- Bakhsh: Central
- Rural District: Shahsavan Kandi

Population (2006)
  - Total: 40
- Time zone: UTC+3:30 (IRST)
  - Summer (DST): UTC+4:30 (IRDT)

Azizabad (Persian: عزيزاباد, also Romanized as ‘Azīzābād; also known as ‘Azīzābād-e Seqryātān, and Qeshlāq-e ‘Azīzābād) is a village in Shahsavan Kandi Rural District, in the Central District of Saveh County, Markazi Province, Iran. At the 2006 census, its population was 40, in 11 families.
