= Azizabad-e Olya =

Azizabad-e Olya عزيزابادعليا
- Village
- Location within Iran
- Coordinates: 31°58′21″N 50°23′40″E
- Country: Iran
- Province: Chaharmahal and Bakhtiari
- County: Ardal
- Bakhsh: Central
- Rural District: Dinaran

Population (2006)
  - Total: 171
- Time zone: UTC+3:30 (IRST)
  - Summer (DST): UTC+4:30 (IRDT)

Azizabad-e Olya (Persian: عزيزابادعليا, also Romanized as ‘Azīzābād-e ‘Olyā and ‘Azīzābād ‘Olyā; also known as Azīz Ābād and ‘Azīzābād-e Bālā) is a village in Dinaran Rural District, in the Central District of Ardal County, Chaharmahal and Bakhtiari Province, Iran. At the 2006 census, its population was 171, in 43 families. The village is populated by Lurs.
