= Qaleh-ye Azizabad =

Qaleh-ye Azizabad (Persian: قلعه عزيزاباد, also Romanized as Qal‘eh-ye ‘Azīzābād; also known as ‘Azīzābād) is a village in Azizabad Rural District, in the Central District of Narmashir County, Kerman Province, Iran.

== Demographics ==
At the 2006 census, its population was 321, in 78 families.
