= Tavakkolabad, Anar =

Tavakkolabad توكل اباد
- Village
- Location within Iran
- Coordinates: 30°52′27″N 55°19′07″E
- Country: Iran
- Province: Kerman
- County: Anar
- Bakhsh: Central
- Rural District: Bayaz

Population (2006)
  - Total: 38
- Time zone: UTC+3:30 (IRST)
  - Summer (DST): UTC+4:30 (IRDT)

Tavakkolabad (Persian: توكل اباد, also Romanized as Tavakkolābād) is a village in Bayaz Rural District, in the Central District of Anar County, Kerman Province, Iran. At the 2006 census, its population was 38, in 9 families.
