= Azizabad, Hormozgan =

Azizabad عزيزاباد
- Village
- Location within Iran
- Coordinates: 27°46′22″N 57°10′56″E
- Country: Iran
- Province: Hormozgan
- County: Rudan
- Bakhsh: Rudkhaneh
- Rural District: Mosaferabad

Population (2006)
  - Total: 50
- Time zone: UTC+3:30 (IRST)
  - Summer (DST): UTC+4:30 (IRDT)

Azizabad (Persian: عزيزاباد, also Romanized as ‘Azīzābād) is a village in Mosaferabad Rural District, Rudkhaneh District, Rudan County, Hormozgan Province, Iran. At the 2006 census, its population was 50, in 12 families.
