= Chahaki, Fars =

Chahaki چاهكي
- Village
- Location within Iran
- Coordinates: 30°11′52″N 51°28′47″E
- Country: Iran
- Province: Fars
- County: Mamasani
- Bakhsh: Central
- Rural District: Fahlian

Population (2006)
  - Total: 104
- Time zone: UTC+3:30 (IRST)
  - Summer (DST): UTC+4:30 (IRDT)

Chahaki (Persian: چاهكي, also Romanized as Chāhakī and Chahakī) is a village in Fahlian Rural District, in the Central District of Mamasani County, Fars province, Iran. At the 2006 census, its population was 104, in 21 families.
