= Mokhtarabad, Kerman =

Mokhtarabad مختاراباد
- Village
- Location within Iran
- Coordinates: 30°21′33″N 57°51′44″E
- Country: Iran
- Province: Kerman
- County: Kerman
- Bakhsh: Shahdad
- Rural District: Takab

Population (2006)
  - Total: 78
- Time zone: UTC+3:30 (IRST)
  - Summer (DST): UTC+4:30 (IRDT)

Mokhtarabad (Persian: مختاراباد, also Romanized as Mokhtārābād) is a village in Takab Rural District, Shahdad District, Kerman County, Kerman Province, Iran. At the 2006 census, its population was 78, in 19 families.
