= Tavakkolabad-e Hanarmand =

Tavakkolabad-e Hanarmand توكل ابادهنرمند
- Village
- Country: Iran
- Province: Kerman
- County: Bardsir
- Bakhsh: Central
- Rural District: Golzar

Population (2006)
  - Total: 26
- Time zone: UTC+3:30 (IRST)
  - Summer (DST): UTC+4:30 (IRDT)

Tavakkolabad-e Hanarmand (Persian: توكل ابادهنرمند, also Romanized as Tavakkolābād-e Hanarmand) is a village in Golzar Rural District, in the Central District of Bardsir County, Kerman Province, Iran. At the 2006 census, its population was 26, in 5 families.
