= Bizhanabad Rural District =

Rural district in Kerman province, Iran

Bizhanabad Rural District Persian: دهستان بیژن‌آباد
- Rural District
- Location within Iran
- Coordinates: 27°57′04″N 58°01′01″E
- Country: Iran
- Province: Kerman
- County: Rudbar-e Jonubi
- District: Central
- Capital: Bizhanabad-e Yek
- Time zone: UTC+3:30 (IRST)

Bizhanabad Rural District (Persian: دهستان بیژن‌آباد) is in the Central District of Rudbar-e Jonubi County, Kerman province, Iran. Its capital is the village of Bizhanabad-e Yek, whose population at the time of the 2016 National Census was 1,140 in 312 households.

== History ==
Bizhanabad Rural District was created in the Central District in 2023.
