= Rigabad, Negin Kavir =

Rigabad ريگ اباد
- Village
- Location within Iran
- Coordinates: 28°55′00″N 59°08′00″E
- Country: Iran
- Province: Kerman
- County: Fahraj
- Bakhsh: Negin Kavir
- Rural District: Chahdegal

Population (2006)
  - Total: 34
- Time zone: UTC+3:30 (IRST)
  - Summer (DST): UTC+4:30 (IRDT)

Rigabad (Persian: ريگ اباد, also Romanized as Rīgābād; also known as Rīgābād-e Chahār Rīgān) is a village in Chahdegal Rural District, Negin Kavir District, Fahraj County, Kerman Province, Iran. At the 2006 census, its population was 34, in 7 families.
