= Chah-e Hasan Rural District =

Rural district in Kerman province, Iran

Chah-e Hasan Rural District Persian: دهستان چاه حسن
- Rural District
- Location within Iran
- Coordinates: 27°52′51″N 58°19′14″E
- Country: Iran
- Province: Kerman
- County: Jazmurian
- District: Chah-e Hasan
- Capital: Chah-e Hasan Ahmadi
- Time zone: UTC+3:30 (IRST)

Chah-e Hasan Rural District (Persian: دهستان چاه حسن) is in Chah-e Hasan District of Jazmurian County, Kerman province, Iran. Its capital is the village of Chah-e Hasan Ahmadi, whose population at the time of the 2016 National Census was 173 in 43 households.

== History ==
In 2023, the district was separated from the county in the establishment of Jazmurian County and renamed the Central District. Chah-e Hasan Rural District was created in the new Chah-e Hasan District.
