= Tavakkolabad-e Darreh Deraz =

Tavakkolabad-e Darreh Deraz توكل اباددره دراز
- Neighbourhood
- Location within Iran
- Coordinates: 34°19′00″N 47°03′00″E
- Country: Iran
- Province: Kermanshah
- County: Kermanshah
- Bakhsh: Central

Population (2006)
  - Total: 7,429
- Time zone: UTC+3:30 (IRST)

Tavakkolabad-e Darreh Deraz (Persian: توكل اباددره دراز, also Romanized as Tavakkolābād-e Darreh Derāz; also known as Tavakkolābād and Vakīl Āqā) is a Neighbourhood in Kermanshah, Iran. It was a village in Baladarband Rural District, in the Central District of Kermanshah County, Kermanshah Province, Iran. At the 2006 census, its population was 7,429, in 1,572 families.
