= Tavakkolabad-e Amid =

Tavakkolabad-e Amid توكل اباداميد
- Village
- Country: Iran
- Province: Kerman
- County: Bardsir
- Bakhsh: Central
- Rural District: Mashiz

Population (2006)
  - Total: 30
- Time zone: UTC+3:30 (IRST)
  - Summer (DST): UTC+4:30 (IRDT)

Tavakkolabad-e Amid (Persian: توكل اباداميد, also Romanized as Tavakkolābād-e Amīd) is a village in Mashiz Rural District, in the Central District of Bardsir County, Kerman Province, Iran. At the 2006 census, its population was 30, in 7 families.
