= Arizabad =

Arizabad عريزاباد
- Village
- Location within Iran
- Coordinates: 30°45′20″N 56°34′15″E
- Country: Iran
- Province: Kerman
- County: Zarand
- Bakhsh: Central
- Rural District: Vahdat

Population (2006)
  - Total: 263
- Time zone: UTC+3:30 (IRST)
  - Summer (DST): UTC+4:30 (IRDT)

Arizabad (Persian: عريزاباد, also Romanized as ʿArīzābād; also known as ‘Azīzābād) is a village in Vahdat Rural District, in the Central District of Zarand County, Kerman Province, Iran. At the 2006 census, its population was 263, in 61 families.
