= Kalateh-ye Tuklabad =

Kalateh-ye Tuklabad كلاته توكل اباد
- Village
- Country: Iran
- Province: South Khorasan
- County: Nehbandan
- Bakhsh: Shusef
- Rural District: Shusef

Population (2006)
  - Total: 40
- Time zone: UTC+3:30 (IRST)
  - Summer (DST): UTC+4:30 (IRDT)

Kalateh-ye Tuklabad (Persian: كلاته توكل اباد, also Romanized as Kalāteh-ye Tūḵlābād) is a village in Shusef Rural District, Shusef District, Nehbandan County, South Khorasan Province, Iran. At the 2006 census, its population was 40, in 8 families.
