= Rigabad, Fahraj =

Rigabad ريگاباد
- Village
- Location within Iran
- Coordinates: 28°50′34″N 58°53′14″E
- Country: Iran
- Province: Kerman
- County: Fahraj
- Bakhsh: Central
- Rural District: Borj-e Akram

Population (2006)
  - Total: 32
- Time zone: UTC+3:30 (IRST)
  - Summer (DST): UTC+4:30 (IRDT)

Rigabad (Persian: ريگاباد, also romanized as Rīgābād) is a village in Borj-e Akram Rural District, in the Central District of Fahraj County, Kerman Province, Iran. At the 2006 census its population was 32, in 6 families.
