= Tavakkolabad, Anbarabad =

Tavakkolabad توكل اباد
- Village
- Location within Iran
- Coordinates: 28°26′34″N 57°49′40″E
- Country: Iran
- Province: Kerman
- County: Anbarabad
- Bakhsh: Central
- Rural District: Aliabad

Population (2006)
  - Total: 429
- Time zone: UTC+3:30 (IRST)
  - Summer (DST): UTC+4:30 (IRDT)

Tavakkolabad (Persian: توكل اباد, also romanized as Tavakkolābād; also known as Tavakolābād-e Pā’īn) is a village in Aliabad Rural District, in the Central District of Anbarabad County, Kerman Province, Iran. At the 2006 census, its population was 429, in 87 families.
