= Mokhtarabad-e Bon Rud =

Mokhtarabad-e Bon Rud مختارآباد بُن رود
- village
- Location within Iran
- Coordinates: 29°47′34″N 51°51′49″E
- Country: Iran
- Province: Fars
- County: Shiraz
- Bakhsh: Arzhan
- Rural District: Dasht-e Arzhan

Population (2006)
  - Total: 136
- Time zone: UTC+3:30 (IRST)
  - Summer (DST): UTC+4:30 (IRDT)

Mokhtarabad-e Bon Rud (Persian: مختارآباد بُن رود, also Romanized as Mokhtārābād-e Bon Rūd; also known as Mokhtārābād) is a village in Dasht-e Arzhan Rural District, Arzhan District, Shiraz County, Fars province, Iran. At the 2006 census, its population was 136, in 32 families.
