= Azizabad, Harsin =

Azizabad عزيزاباد
- Village
- Location within Iran
- Coordinates: 34°17′42″N 47°25′02″E
- Country: Iran
- Province: Kermanshah
- County: Harsin
- Bakhsh: Bisotun
- Rural District: Shirez

Population (2006)
  - Total: 331
- Time zone: UTC+3:30 (IRST)
  - Summer (DST): UTC+4:30 (IRDT)

Azizabad (Persian: عزيزاباد, also Romanized as ‘Azīzābād) is a village in Shirez Rural District, Bisotun District, Harsin County, Kermanshah Province, Iran. At the 2006 census, its population was 331, in 81 families.
