= Rigabad, Anbarabad =

Rigabad ريگ اباد
- Village
- Location within Iran
- Coordinates: 28°30′34″N 57°48′30″E
- Country: Iran
- Province: Kerman
- County: Anbarabad
- Bakhsh: Central
- Rural District: Mohammadabad

Population (2006)
  - Total: 276
- Time zone: UTC+3:30 (IRST)
  - Summer (DST): UTC+4:30 (IRDT)

Rigabad (Persian: ريگ اباد, also Romanized as Rīgābād) is a village in Mohammadabad Rural District, in the Central District of Anbarabad County, Kerman Province, Iran. At the 2006 census, its population was 276, comprising 47 families.
