= Tavakkolabad-e Yek =

Tavakkolabad-e Yek توكل آباد1
- Village
- Location within Iran
- Coordinates: 28°44′24″N 59°08′15″E
- Country: Iran
- Province: Kerman
- County: Rigan
- Bakhsh: Central
- Rural District: Rigan

Population (2006)
  - Total: 287
- Time zone: UTC+3:30 (IRST)
  - Summer (DST): UTC+4:30 (IRDT)

Tavakkolabad-e Yek (Persian: توكل آباد1, also Romanized as Tavakkolābād-e Yek; also known as Tavakkolābād) is a village in Rigan Rural District, in the Central District of Rigan County, Kerman Province, Iran. At the 2006 census, its population was 287, in 53 families.
