= Tavakkolabad-e Do, Rigan =

Tavakkolabad-e Do توكل آباد2
- Village
- Location within Iran
- Coordinates: 28°36′53″N 59°06′07″E
- Country: Iran
- Province: Kerman
- County: Rigan
- Bakhsh: Central
- Rural District: Rigan

Population (2006)
  - Total: 66
- Time zone: UTC+3:30 (IRST)
  - Summer (DST): UTC+4:30 (IRDT)

Tavakkolabad-e Do (Persian: توكل آباد2, also Romanized as Tavakkolābād-e Do; also known as Tavakkolābād) is a village in Rigan Rural District, in the Central District of Rigan County, Kerman Province, Iran. At the 2006 census, its population was 66, in 12 families.
