= Azizabad, Qaratureh =

Azizabad عزيز آباد
- Village
- Location within Iran
- Coordinates: 36°01′14″N 47°04′17″E
- Country: Iran
- Province: Kurdistan
- County: Divandarreh
- Bakhsh: Central
- Rural District: Qaratureh

Population (2006)
  - Total: 51
- Time zone: UTC+3:30 (IRST)
  - Summer (DST): UTC+4:30 (IRDT)

Azizabad (Persian: عزيز آباد, also Romanized as ‘Azīzābād) is a village in Qaratureh Rural District, in the Central District of Divandarreh County, Kurdistan Province, Iran. At the 2006 census, its population was 51, in 10 families. The village is populated by Kurds.
