= Tavakkolabad, Rabor =

Tavakkolabad توكل اباد
- Village
- Location within Iran
- Coordinates: 29°03′19″N 57°05′48″E
- Country: Iran
- Province: Kerman
- County: Rabor
- Bakhsh: Hanza
- Rural District: Javaran

Population (2006)
  - Total: 109
- Time zone: UTC+3:30 (IRST)
  - Summer (DST): UTC+4:30 (IRDT)

Tavakkolabad (Persian: توكل اباد, also Romanized as Tavakkolābād) is a village in Javaran Rural District, Hanza District, Rabor County, Kerman Province, Iran. At the 2006 census, its population was 109, in 34 families.
