= Rigabad, Maskun =

Rigabad ريگ اباد
- Village
- Location within Iran
- Coordinates: 29°04′05″N 57°40′16″E
- Country: Iran
- Province: Kerman
- County: Jiroft
- Bakhsh: Jebalbarez
- Rural District: Maskun

Population (2006)
  - Total: 107
- Time zone: UTC+3:30 (IRST)
  - Summer (DST): UTC+4:30 (IRDT)

Rigabad (Persian: ريگ اباد, also Romanized as Rīgābād; also known as Rik Abad) is a village in Maskun Rural District, Jebalbarez District, Jiroft County, Kerman Province, Iran. At the 2006 census, its population was 107, in 22 families.
