= Sabz Gezi, Anbarabad =

Sabz Gezi سبزگزي
- Village
- Location within Iran
- Coordinates: 28°18′10″N 57°53′34″E
- Country: Iran
- Province: Kerman
- County: Anbarabad
- Bakhsh: Central
- Rural District: Jahadabad

Population (2006)
  - Total: 474
- Time zone: UTC+3:30 (IRST)
  - Summer (DST): UTC+4:30 (IRDT)

Sabz Gezi (Persian: سبزگزي, also Romanized as Sabz Gezī) is a village in Jahadabad Rural District, in the Central District of Anbarabad County, Kerman Province, Iran. At the 2006 census, its population was 474, in 104 families.
