= Azizabad, Ray =

Azizabad عزیزآباد
- Village
- Country: Iran
- Province: Tehran
- County: Rey
- Bakhsh: Fashapuyeh
- Rural District: Hasanabad

Population (2006)
  - Total: 9
- Time zone: UTC+3:30 (IRST)
  - Summer (DST): UTC+4:30 (IRDT)

Azizabad (Persian: عزیزآباد, also Romanized as ʿAzīzābād) is a village in Hasanabad Rural District, Fashapuyeh District, Ray County, Tehran Province, Iran. At the 2006 census, its population was 9, in 4 families.
