= Azizabad-e Sheybani =

Azizabad-e Sheybani عزيزابادشيباني
- Village
- Location within Iran
- Coordinates: 28°22′04″N 57°48′29″E
- Country: Iran
- Province: Kerman
- County: Anbarabad
- Bakhsh: Central
- Rural District: Aliabad

Population (2006)
  - Total: 141
- Time zone: UTC+3:30 (IRST)
  - Summer (DST): UTC+4:30 (IRDT)

Azizabad-e Sheybani (Persian: عزيزابادشيباني, also Romanized as ʿAzīzābād-e Sheybānī) is a village in Aliabad Rural District, in the Central District of Anbarabad County, Kerman Province, Iran. At the 2006 census, its population was 141, in 27 families.
