= Shebib =

Shebib is a surname. Notable people with the surname include:

- Donald Shebib (1938-2023), Canadian film director
- Noah James Shebib (born 1983), Canadian record producer
