= Chah-e Hasan District =

District in Kerman province, Iran

Chah-e Hasan District Persian: بخش چاه حسن
- District
- Location within Iran
- Coordinates: 28°04′N 58°35′E
- Country: Iran
- Province: Kerman
- County: Jazmurian
- Capital: Mohammadabad-e Kataki
- Time zone: UTC+3:30 (IRST)

Chah-e Hasan District (Persian: بخش چاه حسن) is in Jazmurian County, Kerman province, Iran. Its capital is the village of Mohammadabad-e Kataki, whose population at the time of the 2016 National Census was 1,548 people in 363 households.

== History ==
In 2023, Jazmurian District (Note: Renamed the Central District of Jazmurian County) was separated from Rudbar-e Jonubi County in the establishment of Jazmurian County and renamed the Central District. The new county was divided into two districts of two rural districts each, with Zeh-e Kalut as its capital and only city at the time.

== Demographics ==
=== Administrative divisions ===
Chah-e Hasan District
Administrative Divisions
Chah-e Hasan RD
Kuhestan RD
RD = Rural District
