= Zeh-e Kalut =

City in Kerman province, Iran

Zeh-e Kalut Persian: زه کلوت
- City
- Location within Iran
- Coordinates: 27°47′49″N 58°35′12″E
- Country: Iran
- Province: Kerman
- County: Jazmurian
- District: Central

Population (2016)
  - Total: 6,835
- Time zone: UTC+3:30 (IRST)

Zeh-e Kalut (Persian: زه کلوت) (Note: Also romanized as Zeh-e Kalūt) is a city in the Central District (Note: Formerly Jazmurian District of Rudbar-e Jonubi County) of Jazmurian County, Kerman province, Iran, serving as capital of both the county and the district. As a village, it was the capital of Jazmurian Rural District until its capital was transferred to the village of Miyandaran.

== Demographics ==
=== Population ===
At the time of the 2006 National Census, Zeh-e Kalut's population was 2,556 in 534 households, when it was a village in Jazmurian Rural District of Jazmurian District (Note: Renamed the Central District of Jazmurian County) in Rudbar-e Jonubi County. The following census in 2011 counted 4,091 people in 878 households. The 2016 census measured the population as 6,835 people in 1,793 households, by which time the village had merged with the villages of Cheraghabad-e Zeh-e Kalut, Hasanabad-e Zeh-e Kalut, and Hoseynabad-e Zeh-e Kalut and was elevated to the status of a city.

In 2023, the district was separated from the county in the establishment of Jazmurian County and renamed the Central District, with Zeh-e Kalut as the new county's capital.
