= Halil Dasht District =

District in Kerman province, Iran

Halil Dasht District Persian: بخش هلیل دشت
- District
- Location within Iran
- Coordinates: 27°51′20″N 58°06′29″E
- Country: Iran
- Province: Kerman
- County: Rudbar-e Jonubi
- Capital: Hana
- Time zone: UTC+3:30 (IRST)

Halil Dasht District (Persian: بخش هلیل دشت) is in Rudbar-e Jonubi County, Kerman province, Iran. Its capital is the village of Hana, whose population at the time of the 2016 National Census was 969 people in 247 households.

== History ==
In 2023, Nehzatabad Rural District was separated from the Central District in the formation of Halil Dasht District.

== Demographics ==
=== Administrative divisions ===
Halil Dasht District
Administrative Divisions
Abbasabad RD
Nehzatabad RD
RD = Rural District
