= Jazmurian County =

County in Kerman province, Iran

Jazmurian County Persian: شهرستان جازموریان
- County
- Location of Jazmurian County in Kerman province (bottom right, pink)

- Location of Kerman province in Iran
- Coordinates: 27°51′10″N 58°36′29″E
- Country: Iran
- Province: Kerman
- Capital: Zeh-e Kalut
- Districts: Central, Chah-e Hasan
- Time zone: UTC+3:30 (IRST)

Jazmurian County (Persian: شهرستان جازموریان, romanized: Shahrestan Jazmorian) is in Kerman province, Iran. Its capital is the city of Zeh-e Kalut, whose population at the time of the 2016 National Census was 6,835 people in 1,793 households.

== History ==
In 2023, Jazmurian District (Note: Renamed the Central District of Jazmurian County) was separated from Rudbar-e Jonubi County in the establishment of Jazmurian County and renamed the Central District. The new county was divided into two districts of two rural districts each, with Zeh-e Kalut as its capital and only city at the time.

== Demographics ==
=== Administrative divisions ===
Jazmurian County's administrative structure is shown in the following table.

Jazmurian County
Administrative Divisions
Central District (Note: Formerly Jazmurian District of Rudbar-e Jonubi County)
Boeing RD
Jazmurian RD
Zeh-e Kalut (city)
Chah-e Hasan District
Chah-e Hasan RD
Kuhestan RD
RD = Rural District

== See also ==
Media related to Jazmurian County at Wikimedia Commons
