= Jazmurian Rural District =

Rural district in Kerman province, Iran

Jazmurian Rural District Persian: دهستان جازموريان
- Rural District
- Location within Iran
- Coordinates: 27°46′20″N 58°48′22″E
- Country: Iran
- Province: Kerman
- County: Jazmurian
- District: Central
- Capital: Miyandaran

Population (2016)
  - Total: 31,642
- Time zone: UTC+3:30 (IRST)

Jazmurian Rural District (Persian: دهستان جازموريان) is in the Central District (Note: Formerly Jazmurian District of Rudbar-e Jonubi County) of Jazmurian County, Kerman province, Iran. Its capital is the village of Miyandaran. The previous capital of the rural district was the village of Zeh-e Kalut, now a city.

== Demographics ==
=== Population ===
At the time of the 2006 National Census, the rural district's population (as a part of Jazmurian District (Note: Renamed the Central District of Jazmurian County) in Rudbar-e Jonubi County) was 32,020 in 6,335 households. There were 36,625 inhabitants in 8,333 households at the following census of 2011. The 2016 census measured the population of the rural district as 31,642 in 7,804 households. The most populous of its 204 villages was Kalatang, with 2,304 people.

In 2023, the district was separated from the county in the establishment of Jazmurian County and renamed the Central District.
