= Nehzatabad Rural District =

Rural district in Kerman province, Iran

Nehzatabad Rural District Persian: دهستان نهضت آباد
- Rural District
- Location within Iran
- Coordinates: 27°53′12″N 58°10′11″E
- Country: Iran
- Province: Kerman
- County: Rudbar-e Jonubi
- District: Halil Dasht
- Capital: Nehzatabad

Population (2016)
  - Total: 21,538
- Time zone: UTC+3:30 (IRST)

Nehzatabad Rural District (Persian: دهستان نهضت آباد) is in Halil Dasht District of Rudbar-e Jonubi County, Kerman province, Iran. Its capital is the village of Nehzatabad.

== Demographics ==
=== Population ===
At the time of the 2006 National Census, the rural district's population (as a part of the Central District) was 19,921 in 3,916 households. There were 22,946 inhabitants in 5,295 households at the following census of 2011. The 2016 census measured the population of the rural district as 21,538 in 5,467 households. The most populous of its 61 villages was Chah-e Ali, with 1,735 people.

In 2023, the rural district was separated from the district in the formation of Halil Dasht District.
