= Rudbar Rural District (Rudbar-e Jonubi County) =

Rural district in Kerman province, Iran

Rudbar Rural District Persian: دهستان رودبار
- Rural District
- Location within Iran
- Coordinates: 28°05′01″N 57°55′41″E
- Country: Iran
- Province: Kerman
- County: Rudbar-e Jonubi
- District: Central
- Capital: Firuzabad

Population (2016)
  - Total: 25,840
- Time zone: UTC+3:30 (IRST)

Rudbar Rural District (Persian: دهستان رودبار) is in the Central District of Rudbar-e Jonubi County, Kerman province, Iran. Its capital is the village of Firuzabad. The previous capital of the rural district was the village of Eslamabad.

== Demographics ==
=== Population ===
At the time of the 2006 National Census, the rural district's population was 22,096 in 4,476 households. There were 27,543 inhabitants in 6,754 households at the following census of 2011. The 2016 census measured the population of the rural district as 25,840 in 7,097 households. The most populous of its 71 villages was Qasemabad, with 1,625 people.
