= Kuhestan Rural District (Jazmurian County) =

Rural district in Kerman province, Iran

Kuhestan Rural District Persian: دهستان كوهستان
- Rural District
- Location within Iran
- Coordinates: 28°01′36″N 58°31′29″E
- Country: Iran
- Province: Kerman
- County: Jazmurian
- District: Chah-e Hasan
- Capital: Borj-e Abbasabad

Population (2016)
  - Total: 5,390
- Time zone: UTC+3:30 (IRST)

Kuhestan Rural District (Persian: دهستان كوهستان) is in Chah-e Hasan District of Jazmurian County, Kerman province, Iran. Its capital is the village of Borj-e Abbasabad.

== Demographics ==
=== Population ===
At the time of the 2006 National Census, the rural district's population (as a part of Jazmurian District (Note: Renamed the Central District of Jazmurian County) in Rudbar-e Jonubi County) was 4,435 in 960 households. There were 5,084 inhabitants in 1,325 households at the following census of 2011. The 2016 census measured the population of the rural district as 5,390 in 1,484 households. The most populous of its 86 villages was Dehnow-e Kuhestan, with 512 people.

In 2023, the district was separated from the county in the establishment of Jazmurian County and renamed the Central District. The rural district was transferred to the new Chah-e Hasan District.
