= Central District (Rudbar-e Jonubi County) =

District in Kerman province, Iran

Central District (Rudbar-e Jonubi County) Persian: بخش مرکزی شهرستان رودبار جنوب
- District
- Location within Iran
- Coordinates: 28°05′N 58°03′E
- Country: Iran
- Province: Kerman
- County: Rudbar-e Jonubi
- Capital: Rudbar

Population (2016)
  - Total: 62,125
- Time zone: UTC+3:30 (IRST)

The Central District of Rudbar-e Jonubi County (Persian: بخش مرکزی شهرستان رودبار جنوب) is in Kerman province, Iran. Its capital is the city of Rudbar.

== History ==
In 2023, Bizhanabad Rural District was created in the district, and Nehzatabad Rural District was separated from it in the formation of Halil Dasht District.

== Demographics ==
=== Population ===
At the time of the 2006 National Census, the district's population was 50,292 in 10,069 households. The following census in 2011 counted 62,712 people in 14,867 households. The 2016 census measured the population of the district as 62,125 inhabitants in 16,347 households.

=== Administrative divisions ===
Central District (Rudbar-e Jonubi County) Population
Administrative Divisions	2006	2011	2016
Bizhanabad RD (Note: Established after the 2016 census)			
Nehzatabad RD (Note: Transferred to Halil Dasht District)	19,921	22,946	21,538
Rudbar RD	22,096	27,543	25,840
Rudbar (city)	8,275	12,223	14,747
Total	50,292	62,712	62,125
RD = Rural District
