= Central District (Jazmurian County) =

District in Kerman province, Iran

Central District (Jazmurian County) Persian: بخش مرکزی شهرستان جازموریان
- District
- Location within Iran
- Coordinates: 27°49′57″N 58°38′00″E
- Country: Iran
- Province: Kerman
- County: Jazmurian
- Capital: Zeh-e Kalut

Population (2016)
  - Total: 43,867 (Note: As Jazmurian District of Rudbar-e Jonubi County)
- Time zone: UTC+3:30 (IRST)

The Central District of Jazmurian County (Persian: بخش مرکزی شهرستان جازموریان) (Note: Formerly Jazmurian District (بخش جازموریان) of Rudbar-e Jonubi County) is in Kerman province, Iran. Its capital is the city of Zeh-e Kalut.

== History ==
After the 2011 National Census, the village of Zeh-e Kalut merged with several villages and was elevated to the status of a city. In 2023, Jazmurian District (Note: Renamed the Central District of Jazmurian County) was separated from Rudbar-e Jonubi County in the establishment of Jazmurian County and renamed the Central District. The new county was divided into two districts of two rural districts each, with Zeh-e Kalut as its capital and only city at the time.

== Demographics ==
=== Population ===
At the time of the 2006 census, the district's population (as Jazmurian District of Rudbar-e Jonubi County) was 36,455 in 7,295 households. The following census in 2011 counted 41,709 people in 9,658 households. The 2016 census measured the population of the district as 43,867 inhabitants in 11,081 households.

=== Administrative divisions ===
Central District (Jazmurian County) (Note: As Jazmurian District of Rudbar-e Jonubi County at the 2006, 2011, and 2016 censuses)
Administrative Divisions	2006	2011	2016
Boeing RD (Note: Established after the 2016 census)			
Jazmurian RD	32,020	36,625	31,642
Kuhestan RD (Note: Transferred to Chah-e Hasan District after the 2016 census)	4,435	5,084	5,390
Zeh-e Kalut (city)			6,835
Total	36,455	41,709	43,867
RD = Rural District
