= Rudbar-e Jonubi County =

County in Kerman province, Iran

Rudbar-e Jonubi County Persian: شهرستان رودبار جنوب
- County
- Location of Rudbar-e Jonubi County in Kerman province (bottom center, yellow)

- Location of Kerman province in Iran
- Coordinates: 27°58′03″N 58°03′08″E
- Country: Iran
- Province: Kerman
- Capital: Rudbar
- Districts: Central, Halil Dasht

Population (2016)
  - Total: 105,992
- Time zone: UTC+3:30 (IRST)

Rudbar-e Jonubi County (Persian: شهرستان رودبار جنوب) is in Kerman province, Iran. Its capital is the city of Rudbar.

== History ==
In 2023, Jazmurian District (Note: Renamed the Central District of Jazmurian County) was separated from the county in the establishment of Jazmurian County and renamed the Central District. At the same time, Bizhanabad Rural District was created in the Central District, and Nehzatabad Rural District was separated from it in the formation of Halil Dasht District, including the new Abbasabad Rural District.

== Demographics ==
=== Population ===
At the time of the 2006 National Census, the county's population was 86,747 in 17,364 households. The following census in 2011 counted 104,421 people in 24,506 households. The 2016 census measured the population of the county as 105,992 in 27,428 households.

=== Administrative divisions ===
Rudbar-e Jonubi County's population history and administrative structure over three consecutive censuses are shown in the following table.

Rudbar-e Jonubi County Population
Administrative Divisions	2006	2011	2016
Central District	50,292	62,712	62,125
Bizhanabad RD (Note: Established after the 2016 census)			
Nehzatabad RD	19,921	22,946	21,538
Rudbar RD	22,096	27,543	25,840
Rudbar (city)	8,275	12,223	14,747
Halil Dasht District			
Abbasabad RD			
Nehzatabad RD			
Jazmurian District (Note: Transferred to Jazmurian County after the 2016 census and renamed the Central District)	36,455	41,709	43,867
Jazmurian RD	32,020	36,625	31,642
Kuhestan RD	4,435	5,084	5,390
Zeh-e Kalut (city)			6,835
Total	86,747	104,421	105,992
RD = Rural District

== See also ==
Media related to Rudbar-e Jonubi County at Wikimedia Commons
