= Fathabad =

Fathabad (Persian: فتح اباد) may refer to:

== Iran ==
=== Alborz Province ===
- Fathabad, Alborz, a village in Nazarabad County

=== Chaharmahal and Bakhtiari Province ===
- Fathabad, Chaharmahal and Bakhtiari, a village in Shahrekord County

=== East Azerbaijan Province ===
- Fathabad, East Azerbaijan, a village in Tabriz County

=== Fars Province ===
- Fathabad, Arsanjan, a village in Arsanjan County
- Fathabad, Darab, a village in Darab County
- Fathabad, Fasa, a village in Fasa County
- Fathabad-e Deh-e Arab, a village in Firuzabad County
- Fathabad, Jahrom, a village in Jahrom County
- Fathabad, Kavar, a village in Kavar County
- Fathabad, Kazerun, a village in Kazerun County
- Fathabad, Jereh and Baladeh, a village in Kazerun County
- Fathabad, alternate name of Banaruiyeh, a city in Larestan County
- Fathabad-e Sofla, Marvdasht, a village in Marvdasht County
- Fathabad, Neyriz, a village in Neyriz County
- Fathabad, alternate name of Karzin, a city in Qir and Karzin County
- Fathabad-e Olya, a village in Shiraz County
- Fathabad-e Sofla, Shiraz, a village in Shiraz County
- Fathabad Rural District (Fars Province), in Qir and Karzin County

=== Golestan Province ===
- Fathabad, Golestan, a city in Kalaleh County

=== Hamadan Province ===
- Fathabad, Hamadan, a city in Tuyserkan County

=== Ilam Province ===
- Fathabad, Ilam, a city in Darreh Shahr County

=== Isfahan Province ===
- Fathabad, Kashan, a village in Kashan County
- Fathabad, Semirom, a village in Semirom County

=== Kerman Province ===
- Fathabad, Esmaili, a village in Anbarabad County
- Fathabad, Hoseynabad, a village in Anbarabad County
- Fathabad, Arzuiyeh, a village in Arzuiyeh County
- Fathabad, Baft, a village in Baft County
- Fathabad Rural District (Kerman Province), an administrative subdivision in Baft County
- Fathabad, Fahraj, a village in Fahraj County
- Fathabad, Kuhbanan, a village in Kuhbanan County
- Fathabad, Rafsanjan, a village in Rafsanjan County
- Fathabad, Ferdows, Rafsanjan, a village in Rafsanjan County
- Fathabad, Rudbar-e Jonubi, a village in Rudbar-e Jonubi County
- Fathabad, Dehaj, a village in Shahr-e Babak County
- Fathabad, Madvarat, a village in Shahr-e Babak County
- Fathabad, Sarbanan, a village in Zarand County
- Fathabad, Vahdat, a village in Zarand County
- Fathabad, Yazdanabad, a village in Zarand County
- Fathabad-e Shur, a village in Zarand County
- Fathabad-e Yazdanabad, a village in Zarand County

=== Kermanshah Province ===
- Fathabad Rural District (Kermanshah Province), an administrative subdivision of Qasr-e Shirin County

=== Khuzestan Province ===
- Fathabad, Andika, a village in Andika County

=== Kurdistan Province ===
- Fathabad, Kurdistan, a village in Bijar County

=== Lorestan Province ===
- Fathabad, Borujerd, a village in Borujerd County
- Fathabad, Khorramabad, a village in Khorramabad County
- Fathabad, Selseleh, a village in Selseleh County
- Fattahabad, Lorestan, a village in Delfan County
- Rig Sefid, Zagheh, a village in Khorramabad County

=== Markazi Province ===
- Fathabad, Khomeyn, a village in Khomeyn County
- Fathabad, Komijan, a village in Komijan County

=== North Khorasan Province ===
- Fathabad, North Khorasan, a village in Esfarayen County

=== Qazvin Province ===
- Fathabad, Qazvin, a village in Buin Zahra County

=== Razavi Khorasan Province ===
- Fathabad, Bardaskan, a village in Bardaskan County
- Fathabad, Chenaran, a village in Chenaran County
- Fathabad-e Now, a village in Jowayin County
- Fathabad, Mahvelat, a village in Mahvelat County
- Fathabad, Mashhad, a village in Mashhad County
- Fathabad-e Gorgha, a village in Mashhad County
- Fathabad-e Yazdiha, a village in Mashhad County
- Fathabad, Miyan Jolgeh, a village in Nishapur County
- Fathabad, Zeberkhan, a village in Nishapur County
- Fathabad, Quchan, a village in Quchan County
- Fathabad, Shirin Darreh, a village in Quchan County
- Fathabad, Sudlaneh, a village in Quchan County
- Fathabad, Rashtkhvar, a village in Rashtkhvar County
- Fathabad, Torbat-e Heydarieh, a village in Torbat-e Heydarieh County

=== South Khorasan Province ===
- Fathabad, Boshruyeh, a village in Boshruyeh County
- Fathabad, Ferdows, a village in Ferdows County
- Fathabad, Qaen, a village in Qaen County
- Fathabad, Tabas, a village in Tabas County

=== Tehran Province ===
- Fathabad, Pishva, a village in Pishva County
- Fathabad, Rey, a village in Rey County

=== West Azerbaijan Province ===
- Fathabad, West Azerbaijan, a village in Shahin Dezh County

=== Yazd Province ===
- Fathabad, Khatam, a village in Khatam County
- Fathabad Rural District (Khatam County)
- Fathabad, Mehriz, a village in Mehriz County
- Fathabad, Taft, a village in Taft County

== See also ==
- Fatehabad (disambiguation)
