= Ganjabad =

Ganjabad or Gonjabad (Persian: گنج اباد) may refer to:

== East Azerbaijan Province ==
- Ganjabad-e Olya, East Azerbaijan, a village in Hashtrud County
- Ganjabad-e Sofla, East Azerbaijan, a village in Hashtrud County

== Isfahan Province ==
- Ganjabad, Isfahan, a village in Isfahan County

== Kerman Province ==
- Ganjabad-e Olya, Kerman, a village in Anbarabad County
- Ganjabad-e Sofla, Kerman, a village in Anbarabad County
- Ganjabad, Manujan, a village in Manujan County
- Ganjabad 1, a village in Qaleh Ganj County
- Ganjabad 2, a village in Qaleh Ganj County
- Ganjabad Rural District, in Anbarabad County

== Khuzestan Province ==
- Ganjabad, Khuzestan

== Sistan and Baluchestan Province ==
- Ganjabad, Iranshahr, a village in Iranshahr County

== South Khorasan Province ==
- Ganjabad, Birjand, a village in Birjand County

== West Azerbaijan Province ==
- Ganjabad, Miandoab, a village in Miandoab County
- Ganjabad, Oshnavieh, a village in Oshnavieh County
- Ganjabad, Urmia, a village in Urmia County

== Zanjan Province ==
- Ganjabad, Zanjan
