= Rud Ab (disambiguation) =

Rud Ab is a city in Razavi Khorasan Province, Iran.

Rud Ab or Rood Ab or Rud-e Ab (Persian: روداب) may refer to:

- Rud Ab-e Bala, Kerman Province
- Rud Ab-e Sofla, Kerman Province
- Rud Ab-e Vosta, Kerman Province
- Rud Ab-e Gharbi Rural District, in Kerman Province
- Rud Ab-e Sharqi Rural District, in Kerman Province
- Rud Ab District (disambiguation)
