= Ghik-e Sheykhha =

Ghik-e Sheykhha غيك شيخها
- village
- Location within Iran
- Coordinates: 28°25′28″N 58°05′30″E
- Country: Iran
- Province: Kerman
- County: Anbarabad
- Bakhsh: Jebalbarez-e Jonubi
- Rural District: Garmsar

Population (2006)
  - Total: 155
- Time zone: UTC+3:30 (IRST)
  - Summer (DST): UTC+4:30 (IRDT)

Ghik-e Sheykhha (Persian: غيك شيخها, also Romanized as Ghīk-e Sheykhhā; also known as Ghaik, Ghīk, and Ghīk-e Sheykhān) is a village in Garmsar Rural District, Jebalbarez-e Jonubi District, Anbarabad County, Kerman Province, Iran. Ghīk is 878 meters above sea level. At the 2006 census, its population was 155, in 36 families.

The terrain around Ghīk is hilly to the east, but flat to the west. The highest point nearby is Kūh-e Bonvān, 3,503 meters above sea level, 19.4 km northeast of Ghīk. It is sparsely populated, with 17 inhabitants per square kilometer. The nearest larger community is Mardehek, 10.5 km southeast of Ghīk. The area around is barren with little or no vegetation.
