= Dar Sarvaran =

Dar Sarvaran درسروران
- Village
- Country: Iran
- Province: Kerman
- County: Anbarabad
- Bakhsh: Jebalbarez-e Jonubi
- Rural District: Nargesan

Population (2006)
  - Total: 19
- Time zone: UTC+3:30 (IRST)
  - Summer (DST): UTC+4:30 (IRDT)

Dar Sarvaran (Persian: درسروران, also Romanized as Dar Sarvarān; also known as Razdarān) is a village in Nargesan Rural District, Jebalbarez-e Jonubi District, Anbarabad County, Kerman Province, Iran. At the 2006 census, its population was 19, in 5 families.
