= Savaruiyeh-ye Chorbazan =

Savaruiyeh-ye Chorbazan سوروئيه چربزان
- Village
- Country: Iran
- Province: Kerman
- County: Anbarabad
- Bakhsh: Jebalbarez-e Jonubi
- Rural District: Nargesan

Population (2006)
  - Total: 218
- Time zone: UTC+3:30 (IRST)
  - Summer (DST): UTC+4:30 (IRDT)

Savaruiyeh-ye Chorbazan (Persian: سوروئيه چربزان, also Romanized as Savarūīyeh-ye Chorbazān) is a village in Nargesan Rural District, Jebalbarez-e Jonubi District, Anbarabad County, Kerman Province, Iran. At the 2006 census, its population was 218, in 50 families.
