= Zaruki =

Zaruki زاروكي
- Village
- Location within Iran
- Coordinates: 28°19′28″N 57°45′09″E
- Country: Iran
- Province: Kerman
- County: Anbarabad
- Bakhsh: Esmaili
- Rural District: Ganjabad

Population (2006)
  - Total: 269
- Time zone: UTC+3:30 (IRST)
  - Summer (DST): UTC+4:30 (IRDT)

Zaruki (Persian: زاروكي, also Romanized as Zārūkī) is a village in Ganjabad Rural District, Esmaili District, Anbarabad County, Kerman Province, Iran. At the 2006 census, its population was 269, in 45 families.
