= Dahaneh Bid =

Dahaneh Bid دهنه بيد
- Village
- Location within Iran
- Coordinates: 28°32′19″N 58°03′51″E
- Country: Iran
- Province: Kerman
- County: Anbarabad
- Bakhsh: Jebalbarez-e Jonubi
- Rural District: Garmsar

Population (2006)
  - Total: 123
- Time zone: UTC+3:30 (IRST)
  - Summer (DST): UTC+4:30 (IRDT)

Dahaneh Bid (Persian: دهنه بيد, also Romanized as Dahaneh Bīd and Dahaneh-ye Bīd) is a village in Garmsar Rural District, Jebalbarez-e Jonubi District, Anbarabad County, Kerman Province, Iran. At the 2006 census, its population was 123, in 25 families.
