= Darb-e Ziarat-e Cheshmeh =

Darb-e Ziarat-e Cheshmeh درب زيارت چشمه
- Village
- Location within Iran
- Coordinates: 28°26′43″N 58°14′21″E
- Country: Iran
- Province: Kerman
- County: Anbarabad
- Bakhsh: Jebalbarez-e Jonubi
- Rural District: Garmsar

Population (2006)
  - Total: 158
- Time zone: UTC+3:30 (IRST)
  - Summer (DST): UTC+4:30 (IRDT)

Darb-e Ziarat-e Cheshmeh (Persian: درب زيارت چشمه, also Romanized as Darb-e Zīārat-e Cheshmeh; also known as Darb-e Zīārat, Darb Zīārat, and Darb Zīyārat) is a village in Garmsar Rural District, Jebalbarez-e Jonubi District, Anbarabad County, Kerman Province, Iran. At the 2006 census, its population was 158, in 31 families.
