= Nuvork =

Nuvork نوورك
- Village
- Location within Iran
- Coordinates: 28°21′27″N 58°11′50″E
- Country: Iran
- Province: Kerman
- County: Anbarabad
- Bakhsh: Jebalbarez-e Jonubi
- Rural District: Mardehek

Population (2006)
  - Total: 159
- Time zone: UTC+3:30 (IRST)
  - Summer (DST): UTC+4:30 (IRDT)

Nuvork (Persian: نوورك, also Romanized as Nūvork; also known as Navang, Navank, Novork, and Nūrak) is a village in Mardehek Rural District, Jebalbarez-e Jonubi District, Anbarabad County, Kerman Province, Iran. At the 2006 census, its population was 159, in 32 families.
