= Aghin, Iran =

Aghin اغين
- Village
- Location within Iran
- Coordinates: 28°26′31″N 58°17′07″E
- Country: Iran
- Province: Kerman
- County: Anbarabad
- Bakhsh: Jebalbarez-e Jonubi
- Rural District: Nargesan

Population (2006)
  - Total: 315
- Time zone: UTC+3:30 (IRST)
  - Summer (DST): UTC+4:30 (IRDT)

Aghin (Persian: اغين, also Romanized as Āghīn) is a village in Nargesan Rural District, Jebalbarez-e Jonubi District, Anbarabad County, Kerman Province, Iran. At the 2006 census, its population was 315, in 64 families.
