= Ab Rokhan =

Ab Rokhan ابرخان
- Village
- Location within Iran
- Coordinates: 28°26′35″N 58°11′51″E
- Country: Iran
- Province: Kerman
- County: Anbarabad
- Bakhsh: Jebalbarez-e Jonubi
- Rural District: Garmsar

Population (2006)
  - Total: 195
- Time zone: UTC+3:30 (IRST)
  - Summer (DST): UTC+4:30 (IRDT)

Ab Rokhan (Persian: ابرخان, also Romanized as Āb Rokhān, Āb-e Rokhān, and Ābrakhān) is a village in Garmsar Rural District, Jebalbarez-e Jonubi District, Anbarabad County, Kerman province, Iran. At the 2006 census, its population was 195, in 34 families.
