= Zakht =

Zakht زاخت
- Village
- Location within Iran
- Coordinates: 28°20′57″N 58°05′58″E
- Country: Iran
- Province: Kerman
- County: Anbarabad
- Bakhsh: Jebalbarez-e Jonubi
- Rural District: Mardehek

Population (2006)
  - Total: 254
- Time zone: UTC+3:30 (IRST)
  - Summer (DST): UTC+4:30 (IRDT)

Zakht (Persian: زاخت, also Romanized as Zākht) is a village in Mardehek Rural District, Jebalbarez-e Jonubi District, Anbarabad County, Kerman Province, Iran. At the 2006 census, its population was 254, in 61 families.
