= Hoseynabad-e Humeh =

Hoseynabad-e Humeh or Hosein Abad Hoomeh or Hosain Abad Hoomeh (Persian: حسين ابادحومه) may refer to:

- Hoseynabad-e Humeh, Fars
- Hoseynabad-e Olya, Anbarabad, Kerman Province
- Hoseynabad-e Zinabad, Kerman Province
