= Kahn, Anbarabad =

Kahn كهن
- Village
- Location within Iran
- Coordinates: 28°18′00″N 57°30′00″E
- Country: Iran
- Province: Kerman
- County: Anbarabad
- Bakhsh: Esmaili
- Rural District: Esmaili

Population (2006)
  - Total: 573
- Time zone: UTC+3:30 (IRST)
  - Summer (DST): UTC+4:30 (IRDT)

Kahn (Persian: كهن; also known as Kūhan) is a village in Esmaili Rural District, Esmaili District, Anbarabad County, Kerman Province, Iran. At the 2006 census, its population was 573, in 124 families.
