= Jangal-e Gorgi =

Jangal-e Gorgi جنگل گرگي
- Village
- Location within Iran
- Coordinates: 28°27′35″N 57°39′44″E
- Country: Iran
- Province: Kerman
- County: Anbarabad
- Bakhsh: Esmaili
- Rural District: Hoseynabad

Population (2006)
  - Total: 126
- Time zone: UTC+3:30 (IRST)
  - Summer (DST): UTC+4:30 (IRDT)

Jangal-e Gorgi (Persian: جنگل گرگي, also Romanized as Jangal-e Gorgī) is a village in Hoseynabad Rural District, Esmaili District, Anbarabad County, Kerman Province, Iran. At the 2006 census, its population was 126, in 29 families.
