= Sang-e Hasadi =

Sang-e Hasadi سنگ حسادي
- Village
- Country: Iran
- Province: Kerman
- County: Anbarabad
- Bakhsh: Jebalbarez-e Jonubi
- Rural District: Nargesan

Population (2006)
  - Total: 22
- Time zone: UTC+3:30 (IRST)
  - Summer (DST): UTC+4:30 (IRDT)

Sang-e Hasadi (Persian: سنگ حسادي, also Romanized as Sang-e Ḩasādī) is a village in Nargesan Rural District, Jebalbarez-e Jonubi District, Anbarabad County, Kerman Province, Iran. At the 2006 census, its population was 22, in 5 families.
