= Si Pareh =

Si Pareh سي پاره
- Village
- Location within Iran
- Coordinates: 28°15′09″N 57°30′10″E
- Country: Iran
- Province: Kerman
- County: Anbarabad
- Bakhsh: Esmaili
- Rural District: Esmaili

Population (2006)
  - Total: 151
- Time zone: UTC+3:30 (IRST)
  - Summer (DST): UTC+4:30 (IRDT)

Si Pareh (Persian: سي پاره, also Romanized as Sī Pāreh) is a village in Esmaili Rural District, Esmaili District, Anbarabad County, Kerman Province, Iran. At the 2006 census, its population was 151, in 34 families.
