= Darb Ziarat =

Darb Ziarat درب زيارت
- Village
- Location within Iran
- Coordinates: 28°28′00″N 58°19′00″E
- Country: Iran
- Province: Kerman
- County: Anbarabad
- Bakhsh: Jebalbarez-e Jonubi
- Rural District: Nargesan

Population (2006)
  - Total: 82
- Time zone: UTC+3:30 (IRST)
  - Summer (DST): UTC+4:30 (IRDT)

Darb Ziarat (Persian: درب زيارت, also Romanized as Darb Zīārat; also known as Dar Zīārat) is a village in Nargesan Rural District, Jebalbarez-e Jonubi District, Anbarabad County, Kerman Province, Iran. At the 2006 census, its population was 82, in 16 families.
