= Amirabad, Anbarabad =

Neighborhood in Kerman province, Iran

Amirabad Persian: امیرآباد
- Neighborhood
- Location within Iran
- Coordinates: 28°13′27″N 57°31′03″E
- Country: Iran
- Province: Kerman
- County: Jiroft
- District: Esmaili
- City: Boluk

Population (2011)
  - Total: 186
- Time zone: UTC+3:30 (IRST)

Amirabad (Persian: امیرآباد) (Note: Also romanized as Amīrābād; also known as Amīrābād-e Pā’īn and Amīrābād-e Soflá) is a neighborhood in the city of Boluk in Esmaili District of Jiroft County, Kerman province, Iran.

== Demographics ==
=== Population ===
At the time of the 2006 National Census, Amirabad's population was 101 in 23 households, when it was a village in Esmaili Rural District of Anbarabad County. The following census in 2011 counted 186 people in 52 households, by which time the district had been separated from the county to join Jiroft County.

After the census, the village of Boluk merged with the villages of Amirabad, Hoseynabad-e Sofla, and Mohammadabad-e Sofla to become the city of Boluk.
