= Konarestan =

Konarestan كنارستان
- Village
- Location within Iran
- Coordinates: 28°22′01″N 58°09′09″E
- Country: Iran
- Province: Kerman
- County: Anbarabad
- Bakhsh: Jebalbarez-e Jonubi
- Rural District: Mardehek

Population (2006)
  - Total: 111
- Time zone: UTC+3:30 (IRST)
  - Summer (DST): UTC+4:30 (IRDT)

Konarestan (Persian: كنارستان, also Romanized as Konārestān) is a village in Mardehek Rural District, Jebalbarez-e Jonubi District, Anbarabad County, Kerman Province, Iran. At the 2006 census, its population was 111, in 24 families.
