= Garkuiyeh =

Garkuiyeh گركوييه
- Village
- Location within Iran
- Coordinates: 28°20′42″N 57°42′33″E
- Country: Iran
- Province: Kerman
- County: Anbarabad
- Bakhsh: Esmaili
- Rural District: Ganjabad

Population (2006)
  - Total: 276
- Time zone: UTC+3:30 (IRST)
  - Summer (DST): UTC+4:30 (IRDT)

Garkuiyeh (Persian: گركوييه, also Romanized as Garkū’īyeh; also known as Gar Gooh) is a village in Ganjabad Rural District, Esmaili District, Anbarabad County, Kerman Province, Iran. At the 2006 census, its population was 276, in 61 families.
