= Varamin, Kerman =

Varamin ورامين
- Village
- Location within Iran
- Coordinates: 28°25′39″N 57°43′26″E
- Country: Iran
- Province: Kerman
- County: Anbarabad
- Bakhsh: Esmaili
- Rural District: Hoseynabad

Population (2006)
  - Total: 130
- Time zone: UTC+3:30 (IRST)
  - Summer (DST): UTC+4:30 (IRDT)

Varamin (Persian: ورامين, also Romanized as Varāmīn) is a village in Hoseynabad Rural District, Esmaili District, Anbarabad County, Kerman Province, Iran. At the 2006 census, its population was 130, in 24 families.
