= Darmurti =

Darmurti درمورتي
- Village
- Location within Iran
- Coordinates: 28°26′58″N 58°13′54″E
- Country: Iran
- Province: Kerman
- County: Anbarabad
- Bakhsh: Jebalbarez-e Jonubi
- Rural District: Garmsar

Population (2006)
  - Total: 26
- Time zone: UTC+3:30 (IRST)
  - Summer (DST): UTC+4:30 (IRDT)

Darmurti (Persian: درمورتي, also Romanized as Darmūrtī; also known as Darmūtī) is a village in the Garmsar Rural District, Jebalbarez-e Jonubi District, Anbarabad County, Kerman Province, Iran. According to the 2006 census, it had a population of 26, comprising 4 families.
