= Konar Sabz =

Konar Sabz كنارسبز
- Village
- Location within Iran
- Coordinates: 28°24′19″N 58°07′45″E
- Country: Iran
- Province: Kerman
- County: Anbarabad
- Bakhsh: Jebalbarez-e Jonubi
- Rural District: Garmsar

Population (2006)
  - Total: 46
- Time zone: UTC+3:30 (IRST)
  - Summer (DST): UTC+4:30 (IRDT)

Konar Sabz (Persian: كنارسبز, also Romanized as Konār Sabz) is a village in Garmsar Rural District, Jebalbarez-e Jonubi District, Anbarabad County, Kerman Province, Iran. At the 2006 census, its population was 46, in 11 families.
