= Kuguiyeh =

Kuguiyeh كوگوئيه
- Village
- Location within Iran
- Coordinates: 28°20′55″N 57°42′41″E
- Country: Iran
- Province: Kerman
- County: Anbarabad
- Bakhsh: Esmaili
- Rural District: Ganjabad

Population (2006)
  - Total: 496
- Time zone: UTC+3:30 (IRST)
  - Summer (DST): UTC+4:30 (IRDT)

Kuguiyeh (Persian: كوگوئيه, also Romanized as Kūgū’īyeh; also known as Gūgū’īyeh and Kūgū) is a village in Ganjabad Rural District, Esmaili District, Anbarabad County, Kerman Province, Iran. At the 2006 census, its population was 496, in 106 families.
