= Jeshmeh Baneh =

Jeshmeh Baneh جشمه بنه
- Village
- Location within Iran
- Coordinates: 28°21′35″N 58°28′45″E
- Country: Iran
- Province: Kerman
- County: Anbarabad
- Bakhsh: Jebalbarez-e Jonubi
- Rural District: Nargesan

Population (2006)
  - Total: 23
- Time zone: UTC+3:30 (IRST)
  - Summer (DST): UTC+4:30 (IRDT)

Jeshmeh Baneh (Persian: جشمه بنه; also known as Cheshmehbaneh) is a village in Nargesan Rural District, Jebalbarez-e Jonubi District, Anbarabad County, Kerman Province, Iran. At the 2006 census, its population was 23, in 4 families.
