= Bigaman =

Bigaman بيگمان
- Village
- Location within Iran
- Coordinates: 28°26′00″N 57°44′00″E
- Country: Iran
- Province: Kerman
- County: Anbarabad
- Bakhsh: Esmaili
- Rural District: Hoseynabad

Population (2006)
  - Total: 209
- Time zone: UTC+3:30 (IRST)
  - Summer (DST): UTC+4:30 (IRDT)

Bigaman (Persian: بيگمان, also Romanized as Bīgamān) is a village in Hoseynabad Rural District, Esmaili District, Anbarabad County, Kerman Province, Iran. At the 2006 census, its population was 209, in 41 families.
