= Mohammadabad-e Sofla, Kerman =

Neighborhood in Kerman province, Iran

Mohammadabad-e Sofla Persian: محمدآباد سفلی
- Neighborhood
- Location within Iran
- Coordinates: 28°13′52″N 57°30′48″E
- Country: Iran
- Province: Kerman
- County: Jiroft
- District: Esmaili
- City: Boluk

Population (2011)
  - Total: 167
- Time zone: UTC+3:30 (IRST)

Mohammadabad-e Sofla (Persian: محمدآباد سفلی) (Note: Also romanized as Moḩammadābād-e Soflá; also known as Moḩammadābād Kalāntar, Moḩammadābād Pā’īn, Moḩammadābād-e Kalāntar, and Moḩammadābād-e Pā’īn) is a neighborhood in the city of Boluk in Esmaili District of Jiroft County, Kerman province, Iran.

At the time of the 2006 National Census, Mohammadabad-e Sofla's population was 167 in 37 households, when it was a village in Esmaili Rural District of Anbarabad County. The following census in 2011 counted 167 people in 43 households, by which time the district had been separated from the county to join Jiroft County.

After the census, the village of Boluk merged with the villages of Amirabad, Hoseynabad-e Sofla, and Mohammadabad-e Sofla to become the city of Boluk.
