= Behbud =

Behbud بهبود
- Village
- Location within Iran
- Coordinates: 28°11′41″N 58°20′18″E
- Country: Iran
- Province: Kerman
- County: Anbarabad
- Bakhsh: Jebalbarez-e Jonubi
- Rural District: Nargesan

Population (2006)
  - Total: 12
- Time zone: UTC+3:30 (IRST)
  - Summer (DST): UTC+4:30 (IRDT)

Behbud (Persian: بهبود, also Romanized as Behbūd) is a village in Nargesan Rural District, Jebalbarez-e Jonubi District, Anbarabad County, Kerman Province, Iran. At the 2006 census, its population was 12, in 4 families.
