= Ganjabad-e Pain =

Ganjabad-e Pain (Persian: گنج ابادپائين) may refer to:

- Ganjabad-e Pain, East Azerbaijan
- Ganjabad-e Pain, Anbarabad, Kerman Province
- Ganjabad-e Pain, Qaleh Ganj, Kerman Province

== See also ==
- Ganjabad-e Sofla (disambiguation)
