= Bolbolu-ye Kalantar =

Bolbolu-ye Kalantar بلبلوكلانتر
- Village
- Location within Iran
- Coordinates: 28°13′41″N 57°43′04″E
- Country: Iran
- Province: Kerman
- County: Anbarabad
- Bakhsh: Esmaili
- Rural District: Ganjabad

Population (2006)
  - Total: 216
- Time zone: UTC+3:30 (IRST)
  - Summer (DST): UTC+4:30 (IRDT)

Bolbolu-ye Kalantar (Persian: بلبلوكلانتر, also Romanized as Bolbolū-e Kalāntar; also known as Bolbolū) is a village in Ganjabad Rural District, Esmaili District, Anbarabad County, Kerman Province, Iran. At the 2006 census, its population was 216, in 41 families.
