= Soveleh =

Soveleh صوله
- Village
- Location within Iran
- Coordinates: 28°31′43″N 58°11′40″E
- Country: Iran
- Province: Kerman
- County: Anbarabad
- Bakhsh: Jebalbarez-e Jonubi
- Rural District: Garmsar

Population (2006)
  - Total: 35
- Time zone: UTC+3:30 (IRST)
  - Summer (DST): UTC+4:30 (IRDT)

Soveleh (Persian: صوله; also known as Soveleh Beh, Soveyn, and Sowien) is a village in Garmsar Rural District, Jebalbarez-e Jonubi District, Anbarabad County, Kerman Province, Iran. At the 2006 census, its population was 35, in 6 families.
