= Konar Zaghan =

Konar Zaghan كنارزاغان
- Village
- Location within Iran
- Coordinates: 28°29′11″N 58°04′12″E
- Country: Iran
- Province: Kerman
- County: Anbarabad
- Bakhsh: Jebalbarez-e Jonubi
- Rural District: Garmsar

Population (2006)
  - Total: 16
- Time zone: UTC+3:30 (IRST)
  - Summer (DST): UTC+4:30 (IRDT)

Konar Zaghan (Persian: كنارزاغان, also Romanized as Konār Zāghān) is a village in Garmsar Rural District, Jebalbarez-e Jonubi District, Anbarabad County, Kerman Province, Iran. At the 2006 census, its population was 16, in 5 families.
