= Amjadiyeh-ye Pain =

Amjadiyeh-ye Pain امجديه پائين
- Village
- Location within Iran
- Coordinates: 28°25′02″N 58°03′32″E
- Country: Iran
- Province: Kerman
- County: Anbarabad
- Bakhsh: Jebalbarez-e Jonubi
- Rural District: Garmsar

Population (2006)
  - Total: 78
- Time zone: UTC+3:30 (IRST)
  - Summer (DST): UTC+4:30 (IRDT)

Amjadiyeh-ye Pain (Persian: امجديه پائين, also Romanized as Amjadīyeh-ye Pā’īn; also known as Amjadīyeh) is a village in Garmsar Rural District, Jebalbarez-e Jonubi District, Anbarabad County, Kerman Province, Iran. At the 2006 census, its population was 78, in 15 families.
