= Dorranabad, Anbarabad =

Dorranabad دران اباد
- Village
- Location within Iran
- Coordinates: 28°14′39″N 57°40′04″E
- Country: Iran
- Province: Kerman
- County: Anbarabad
- Bakhsh: Esmaili
- Rural District: Ganjabad

Population (2006)
  - Total: 180
- Time zone: UTC+3:30 (IRST)
  - Summer (DST): UTC+4:30 (IRDT)

Dorranabad (Persian: دران اباد, also Romanized as Dorrānābād) is a village in Ganjabad Rural District, Esmaili District, Anbarabad County, Kerman Province, Iran. At the 2006 census, its population was 180, in 40 families.
