= Ashkam Kuh =

Ashkam Kuh اشكم كوه
- Village
- Location within Iran
- Coordinates: 28°28′15″N 58°11′33″E
- Country: Iran
- Province: Kerman
- County: Anbarabad
- Bakhsh: Jebalbarez-e Jonubi
- Rural District: Garmsar

Population (2006)
  - Total: 208
- Time zone: UTC+3:30 (IRST)
  - Summer (DST): UTC+4:30 (IRDT)

Ashkam Kuh (Persian: اشكم كوه, also Romanized as Ashkam Kūh) is a village in Garmsar Rural District, Jebalbarez-e Jonubi District, Anbarabad County, Kerman Province, Iran. At the 2006 census, its population was 208, in 40 families.
