= Kalejak =

Village in Kerman province, Iran

Kalejak Persian: كلجك
- Village
- Location within Iran
- Coordinates: 28°19′51″N 58°22′40″E
- Country: Iran
- Province: Kerman
- County: Anbarabad
- District: Jebalbarez-e Jonubi
- Rural District: Nargesan

Population (2016)
  - Total: 248
- Time zone: UTC+3:30 (IRST)

Kalejak (Persian: كلجك) (Note: Also known as Kalejak-e ‘Olyā) is a village in, and the capital of, Nargesan Rural District of Jebalbarez-e Jonubi District, Anbarabad County, Kerman province, Iran.

== Demographics ==
=== Population ===
At the time of the 2006 National Census, the village's population was 637 in 110 households. The following census in 2011 counted 344 people in 97 households. The 2016 census measured the population of the village as 248 people in 74 households.
