= Daemak =

Daemak دايمك
- Village
- Location within Iran
- Coordinates: 28°21′33″N 57°59′45″E
- Country: Iran
- Province: Kerman
- County: Anbarabad
- Bakhsh: Jebalbarez-e Jonubi
- Rural District: Mardehek

Population (2006)
  - Total: 496
- Time zone: UTC+3:30 (IRST)
  - Summer (DST): UTC+4:30 (IRDT)

Daemak (Persian: دايمك, also Romanized as Dā’emak; also known as Da’em and Dāyūmk) is a village in Mardehek Rural District, Jebalbarez-e Jonubi District, Anbarabad County, Kerman province, Iran. At the 2006 census, its population was 496, in 106 families.
