= Tigh Siah =

Tigh Siah (Persian: تيغ سياه) may refer to:

- Tigh Siah, Hormozgan
- Tigh Siah, Kerman
