= Hoseynabad-e Dehdar =

Village in Kerman province, Iran

Hoseynabad-e Dehdar Persian: حسين اباد دهدار
- Village
- Location within Iran
- Coordinates: 28°27′24″N 57°44′25″E
- Country: Iran
- Province: Kerman
- County: Jiroft
- District: Esmaili
- Rural District: Hoseynabad

Population (2016)
  - Total: 2,886
- Time zone: UTC+3:30 (IRST)

Hoseynabad-e Dehdar (Persian: حسين اباد دهدار) (Note: Also romanized as Ḩoseynābād-e Dehdār) is a village in Hoseynabad Rural District of Esmaili District, Jiroft County, Kerman province, Iran.

== Demographics ==
=== Population ===
At the time of the 2006 National Census, the village's population was 2,235 in 474 households, when it was in Anbarabad County. The following census in 2011 counted 4,601 people in 1,061 households, by which time the district had been separated from the county to join Jiroft County. The 2016 census measured the population of the village as 2,886 people in 925 households. It was the most populous village in its rural district.
