= Segin, Iran =

Segin سگين
- Village
- Location within Iran
- Coordinates: 28°13′00″N 58°12′32″E
- Country: Iran
- Province: Kerman
- County: Anbarabad
- Bakhsh: Jebalbarez-e Jonubi
- Rural District: Mardehek

Population (2006)
  - Total: 412
- Time zone: UTC+3:30 (IRST)
  - Summer (DST): UTC+4:30 (IRDT)

Segin (Persian: سگين, also Romanized as Segīn) is a village in Mardehek Rural District, Jebalbarez-e Jonubi District, Anbarabad County, Kerman Province, Iran. At the 2006 census, it had a population of 412 people within 63 families.
