= Gazabad, Anbarabad =

Village in Kerman province, Iran

Gazabad Persian: گزاباد
- Village
- Location within Iran
- Coordinates: 28°23′00″N 58°02′34″E
- Country: Iran
- Province: Kerman
- County: Anbarabad
- District: Jebalbarez-e Jonubi
- Rural District: Garmsar

Population (2016)
  - Total: 815
- Time zone: UTC+3:30 (IRST)

Gazabad (Persian: گزاباد) (Note: Also romanized as Gazābād) is a village in Garmsar Rural District of Jebalbarez-e Jonubi District, Anbarabad County, Kerman province, Iran.

== Demographics ==
=== Population ===
At the time of the 2006 National Census, the village's population was 261 in 55 households. The following census in 2011 counted 869 people in 191 households. The 2016 census measured the population of the village as 815 people in 155 households. It was the most populous village in its rural district.
