= Gaz Saleh =

Gaz Saleh (Persian: گزصالح), also rendered as Gaz Sala or Gesaleh or Jezsaleh, may refer to:

- Gaz Saleh-e Olya
- Gaz Saleh-e Sofla
