= Fathabad, Hoseynabad =

Fathabad فتح اباد
- Village
- Location within Iran
- Coordinates: 28°26′50″N 57°44′05″E
- Country: Iran
- Province: Kerman
- County: Anbarabad
- Bakhsh: Esmaili
- Rural District: Hoseynabad

Population (2006)
  - Total: 289
- Time zone: UTC+3:30 (IRST)
  - Summer (DST): UTC+4:30 (IRDT)

Fathabad (Persian: فتح اباد, also Romanized as Fatḩābād) is a village in Hoseynabad Rural District, Esmaili District, Anbarabad County, Kerman Province, Iran. At the 2006 census, its population was 289, in 74 families.
