= Ab Bordeh =

Ab Bordeh (Persian: اببرده) may refer to:

- Ab Bordeh, Anbarabad
- Ab Bordeh, Jiroft
