= Garm Salar Reza =

Village in Kerman province, Iran

Garm Salar Reza Persian: گرم سالار رضا
- Village
- Location within Iran
- Coordinates: 28°25′57″N 58°09′17″E
- Country: Iran
- Province: Kerman
- County: Anbarabad
- District: Jebalbarez-e Jonubi
- Rural District: Garmsar

Population (2016)
  - Total: 802
- Time zone: UTC+3:30 (IRST)

Garm Salar Reza (Persian: گرم سالاررضا) (Note: Also romanized as Garm Sālār Rez̤ā) is a village in, and the capital of, Garmsar Rural District of Jebalbarez-e Jonubi District, Anbarabad County, Kerman province, Iran.

== Demographics ==
=== Population ===
At the time of the 2006 National Census, the village's population was 694 in 149 households. The following census in 2011 counted 670 people in 162 households. The 2016 census measured the population of the village as 802 people in 217 households.
