= Gaz Saleh-e Sofla =

Gaz Saleh-e Sofla گزصالح سفلي
- Village
- Location within Iran
- Coordinates: 28°22′48″N 57°45′01″E
- Country: Iran
- Province: Kerman
- County: Anbarabad
- Bakhsh: Esmaili
- Rural District: Hoseynabad

Population (2006)
  - Total: 382
- Time zone: UTC+3:30 (IRST)
  - Summer (DST): UTC+4:30 (IRDT)

Gaz Saleh-e Sofla (Persian: گزصالح سفلي, also Romanized as Gaz Şāleḩ-e Soflá; also known as Gesāleh-ye Pā’īn and Jezsāleh-ye Soflá) is a village in Hoseynabad Rural District, Esmaili District, Anbarabad County, Kerman Province, Iran. At the 2006 census, its population was 382, in 75 families.
