= Hoseynabad-e Sofla =

Hoseynabad-e Sofla (Persian: حسين ابادسفلي) may refer to:

- Hoseynabad-e Sofla, Kerman
- Hoseynabad-e Sofla, Rafsanjan, Kerman Province
- Hoseynabad-e Sofla, Mazandaran
- Hoseynabad-e Sofla, Kohgiluyeh and Boyer-Ahmad
- Hoseynabad-e Sofla, Sistan and Baluchestan

== See also ==
- Hoseynabad-e Pain (disambiguation)
