= Ab Bordeh, Anbarabad =

Ab Bordeh اببرده
- Village
- Location within Iran
- Coordinates: 28°22′07″N 57°45′55″E
- Country: Iran
- Province: Kerman
- County: Anbarabad
- Bakhsh: Esmaili
- Rural District: Hoseynabad

Population (2006)
  - Total: 210
- Time zone: UTC+3:30 (IRST)
  - Summer (DST): UTC+4:30 (IRDT)

Ab Bordeh (Persian: اببرده, also Romanized as Āb Bordeh) is a village in Hoseynabad Rural District, Esmaili District, Anbarabad County, Kerman Province, Iran. At the 2006 census, its population was 210, in 44 families.
