= Jezfatan =

Jezfatan (Persian: جزفتن) may refer to:

- Jezfatan-e Olya
- Jezfatan-e Sofla
