= Esmaili-ye Sofla, Kerman =

Village in Kerman province, Iran

Esmaili-ye Sofla Persian: اسماعيلي سفلي
- Village
- Location within Iran
- Coordinates: 28°14′59″N 57°34′55″E
- Country: Iran
- Province: Kerman
- County: Jiroft
- District: Esmaili
- Rural District: Esmaili

Population (2016)
  - Total: 2,355
- Time zone: UTC+3:30 (IRST)

Esmaili-ye Sofla (Persian: اسماعيلي سفلي) (Note: Also romanized as Esmā‘īlī Soflá and Esmā‘īlī-ye Soflá; also known as Esmā‘īlī, Esmā‘īlī Pā’īn, Esmā‘īlī-ye Pā’īn, and Esmā‘īlīyeh-ye Soflá) is a village in Esmaili Rural District of Esmaili District, Jiroft County, Kerman province, Iran.

== Demographics ==
=== Population ===
At the time of the 2006 National Census, the village's population was 1,601 in 349 households, when it was in Anbarabad County. The following census in 2011 counted 4,011 people in 999 households, by which time the district had been separated from the county to join Jiroft County. The 2016 census measured the population of the village as 2,355 people in 735 households. It was the most populous village in its rural district.
