= Hajjiabad, Mardehek =

Village in Kerman province, Iran

Hajjiabad Persian: حاجي اباد
- Village
- Location within Iran
- Coordinates: 28°21′54″N 58°01′02″E
- Country: Iran
- Province: Kerman
- County: Anbarabad
- District: Jebalbarez-e Jonubi
- Rural District: Mardehek

Population (2016)
  - Total: 2,356
- Time zone: UTC+3:30 (IRST)

Hajjiabad (Persian: حاجي اباد) (Note: Also romanized as Hājīābād and Ḩājjīābād) is a village in Mardehek Rural District of Jebalbarez-e Jonubi District, Anbarabad County, Kerman province, Iran.

== Demographics ==
=== Population ===
At the time of the 2006 National Census, the village's population was 289 in 67 households. The following census in 2011 counted 3,349 people in 732 households. The 2016 census measured the population of the village as 2,356 people in 705 households. It was the most populous village in its rural district.
