= Ab Sarduiyeh =

Ab Sarduiyeh (Persian: ابسردوييه) may refer to:

- Ab Sarduiyeh, Anbarabad
- Ab Sarduiyeh, Rudbar-e Jonubi
