= Hoseynabad-e Olya, Anbarabad =

Hoseynabad-e Olya حسين ابادعليا
- Village
- Location within Iran
- Coordinates: 28°28′54″N 57°42′56″E
- Country: Iran
- Province: Kerman
- County: Anbarabad
- Bakhsh: Esmaili
- Rural District: Esmaili

Population (2006)
  - Total: 83
- Time zone: UTC+3:30 (IRST)
  - Summer (DST): UTC+4:30 (IRDT)

Hoseynabad-e Olya (Persian: حسين ابادعليا, also Romanized as Ḩoseynābād-e ‘Olyā; also known as Hosein Abad Hoomeh, Ḩoseynābād, Ḩoseynābād-e Bālā, and Hoseynābād-e Hūmeh) is a village in Esmaili Rural District, Esmaili District, Anbarabad County, Kerman Province, Iran. At the 2006 census, its population was 83, in 15 families.
