= Rud Ab-e Sofla =

Rud Ab-e Sofla روداب سفلي
- Village
- Location within Iran
- Coordinates: 28°24′05″N 58°12′47″E
- Country: Iran
- Province: Kerman
- County: Anbarabad
- Bakhsh: Jebalbarez-e Jonubi
- Rural District: Garmsar

Population (2006)
  - Total: 325
- Time zone: UTC+3:30 (IRST)
  - Summer (DST): UTC+4:30 (IRDT)

Rud Ab-e Sofla (Persian: روداب سفلي, also Romanized as Rūd Āb-e Soflá; also known as Rood Ab, Rūd Āb Pā’īn, and Rūd-e Āb-e Pā’īn) is a village in Garmsar Rural District, Jebalbarez-e Jonubi District, Anbarabad County, Kerman province, Iran. At the 2006 census, its population was 325 across 66 families, averaging roughly 5 members per family.
