= Daruiyeh =

Daruiyeh داروييه
- Village
- Location within Iran
- Coordinates: 28°15′01″N 57°33′22″E
- Country: Iran
- Province: Kerman
- County: Anbarabad
- Bakhsh: Esmaili
- Rural District: Esmaili

Population (2006)
  - Total: 937
- Time zone: UTC+3:30 (IRST)
  - Summer (DST): UTC+4:30 (IRDT)

Daruiyeh (Persian: داروييه, also Romanized as Dārū’īyeh and Daroo’iyeh; also known as Darū’ī, Darū’ī Pā’īn, and Darū’ī-ye Pā’īn) is a village in Esmaili Rural District, Esmaili District, Anbarabad County, Kerman Province, Iran. At the 2006 census, its population was 937, in 191 families.
