= Rud Ab-e Vosta =

Rud Ab-e Vosta روداب وسطي
- Village
- Location within Iran
- Coordinates: 28°24′34″N 58°13′45″E
- Country: Iran
- Province: Kerman
- County: Anbarabad
- Bakhsh: Jebalbarez-e Jonubi
- Rural District: Garmsar

Population (2006)
  - Total: 245
- Time zone: UTC+3:30 (IRST)
  - Summer (DST): UTC+4:30 (IRDT)

Rud Ab-e Vosta (Persian: روداب وسطي, also Romanized as Rūd Āb-e Vosţá) is a village in Garmsar Rural District, Jebalbarez-e Jonubi District, Anbarabad County, Kerman Province, Iran. At the 2006 census, its population was 245, in 54 families.
