= Dehnow-e Fath ol Mobin =

Village in Kerman province, Iran

Dehnow-e Fath ol Mobin Persian: دهنو فتح المبين
- Village
- Location within Iran
- Coordinates: 28°20′20″N 57°42′33″E
- Country: Iran
- Province: Kerman
- County: Jiroft
- District: Esmaili
- Rural District: Ganjabad

Population (2016)
  - Total: 676
- Time zone: UTC+3:30 (IRST)

Dehnow-e Fath ol Mobin (Persian: دهنوفتح المبين) (Note: Also romanized as Dehnow-e Fatḥ ol Mobīn; also known as Dehno-e Fatḥolmobīn) is a village in, and the capital of, Ganjabad Rural District of Esmaili District, Jiroft County, Kerman province, Iran.

== Demographics ==
=== Population ===
At the time of the 2006 National Census, the village's population was 452 in 102 households, when it was in Anbarabad County. The following census in 2011 counted 606 people in 155 households, by which time the district had been separated from the county to join Jiroft County. The 2016 census measured the population of the village as 676 people in 196 households.
