= Kavir (disambiguation) =

Kavir is a village in East Azerbaijan Province, Iran.

Kavir (Persian: كوير 'Salt pan (geology)') may also refer to:

- Kavir languages
- Kavir-e Bala, a village in Kerman Province
- Dasht-e Kavir, a desert
  - Kavir Buzurg, centre of the above desert
  - Kavir National Park, part of the desert
- Kavir Rural District (disambiguation)
- Kavir (book), a book by Ali Shariati
