= Jezfatan-e Sofla =

Jezfatan-e Sofla جزفتن سفلي
- Village
- Location within Iran
- Coordinates: 28°13′30″N 57°41′58″E
- Country: Iran
- Province: Kerman
- County: Anbarabad
- Bakhsh: Esmaili
- Rural District: Ganjabad

Population (2006)
  - Total: 130
- Time zone: UTC+3:30 (IRST)
  - Summer (DST): UTC+4:30 (IRDT)

Jezfatan-e Sofla (Persian: جزفتن سفلي, also Romanized as Jezfaţan-e Soflá) is a village in Ganjabad Rural District, Esmaili District, Anbarabad County, Kerman Province, Iran. At the 2006 census, its population was 130, in 21 families.
