= Ganjabad-e Sofla =

Ganjabad-e Sofla (Persian: گنج ابادسفلي) may refer to:

- Ganjabad-e Sofla, East Azerbaijan
- Ganjabad-e Sofla, Kerman

== See also ==
- Ganjabad-e Pain (disambiguation)
