= Kaviz-e Sofla =

Kaviz-e Sofla كويزسفلي
- Village
- Location within Iran
- Coordinates: 28°18′42″N 58°12′36″E
- Country: Iran
- Province: Kerman
- County: Anbarabad
- Bakhsh: Jebalbarez-e Jonubi
- Rural District: Mardehek

Population (2006)
  - Total: 391
- Time zone: UTC+3:30 (IRST)
  - Summer (DST): UTC+4:30 (IRDT)

Kaviz-e Sofla (Persian: كويزسفلي, also Romanized as Kavīz-e Soflá; also known as Kavīz-e Pā’īn) is a village in Mardehek Rural District, Jebalbarez-e Jonubi District, Anbarabad County, Kerman Province, Iran. At the 2006 census, its population was 391, in 67 families.
