= Tang Shah =

Tang Shah (Persian: تنگ شاه) may refer to:

- Tang Shah, Kerman
- Tang Shah, Khuzestan
