= Somsili =

Somsili or Samsili (Persian: سمسيلي) may refer to:

- Somsili, Hormozgan
- Samsili, Kerman
