= Ab Sarduiyeh, Anbarabad =

Ab Sarduiyeh ابسردوييه
- Village
- Location within Iran
- Coordinates: 28°21′00″N 58°06′00″E
- Country: Iran
- Province: Kerman
- County: Anbarabad
- Bakhsh: Jebalbarez-e Jonubi
- Rural District: Mardehek

Population (2006)
  - Total: 69
- Time zone: UTC+3:30 (IRST)
  - Summer (DST): UTC+4:30 (IRDT)

Ab Sarduiyeh (Persian: ابسردوييه, also Romanized as Āb Sardū’īyeh; also known as Āb Sardū’īyeh-ye Jamāl) is a village in Mardehek Rural District, Jebalbarez-e Jonubi District, Anbarabad County, Kerman province, Iran. At the 2006 census, its population was 69, in 18 families.
