= Kaviz =

Kaviz (Persian: كويز), also rendered as Kauz or Kuiz, may refer to:

- Kaviz-e Olya, Kerman Province
- Kaviz-e Sofla, Kerman Province
- Kaviz-e Diklan, Razavi Khorasan Province
