= Hoseynabad-e Pain =

Hoseynabad-e Pain (Persian: حسين ابادپائين) may refer to:

- Hoseynabad-e Pain, Anbarabad, Kerman Province
- Hoseynabad-e Pain, Rafsanjan, Kerman Province
- Hoseynabad-e Pain, South Khorasan

== See also ==
- Hoseynabad-e Sofla (disambiguation)
