= Rud Ab-e Bala =

Rud Ab-e Bala روداب بالا
- Village
- Location within Iran
- Coordinates: 28°26′18″N 58°14′59″E
- Country: Iran
- Province: Kerman
- County: Anbarabad
- Bakhsh: Jebalbarez-e Jonubi
- Rural District: Garmsar

Population (2006)
  - Total: 567
- Time zone: UTC+3:30 (IRST)
  - Summer (DST): UTC+4:30 (IRDT)

Rud Ab-e Bala (Persian: روداب بالا, also Romanized as Rūd Āb-e Bālā, Rūd Āb Bālā, and Rūd-e Āb-e Bālā; also known as Rood Ab, Rūd Āb, Rūd-e Āb, and Rūd Āb-e ‘Olyā) is a village in Garmsar Rural District, Jebalbarez-e Jonubi District, Anbarabad County, Kerman Province, Iran. At the 2006 census, its population was 567, in 110 families.
