= Karimabad-e Sofla =

Village in Kerman province, Iran

Karimabad-e Sofla Persian: كريم اباد سفلي
- Village
- Location within Iran
- Coordinates: 28°28′53″N 57°42′59″E
- Country: Iran
- Province: Kerman
- County: Jiroft
- District: Esmaili
- Rural District: Hoseynabad

Population (2016)
  - Total: 1,324
- Time zone: UTC+3:30 (IRST)

Karimabad-e Sofla (Persian: كريم ابادسفلي) (Note: Also romanized as Karīmābād-e Soflá; also known as Karīmābād-e Farzān and Karīmābād-e Pā’īn) is a village in, and the capital of, Hoseynabad Rural District of Esmaili District, Jiroft County, Kerman province, Iran.

== Demographics ==
=== Population ===
At the time of the 2006 National Census, the village's population was 1,123 in 236 households, when it was in Anbarabad County. The following census in 2011 counted 1,234 people in 319 households, by which time the district had been separated from the county to join Jiroft County. The 2016 census measured the population of the village as 1,324 people in 360 households.
