= Terj =

Village in Kerman province, Iran

Terj Persian: طرج
- Village
- Location within Iran
- Coordinates: 28°16′35″N 57°38′30″E
- Country: Iran
- Province: Kerman
- County: Jiroft
- District: Esmaili
- Rural District: Ganjabad

Population (2016)
  - Total: 1,874
- Time zone: UTC+3:30 (IRST)

Terj (Persian: طرج) (Note: Also romanized as Ţarj and Ţerj) is a village in Ganjabad Rural District of Esmaili District, Jiroft County, Kerman province, Iran.

== Demographics ==
=== Population ===
At the time of the 2006 National Census, the village's population was 1,266 in 274 households, when it was in Anbarabad County. The following census in 2011 counted 1,326 people in 341 households, by which time the district had been separated from the county to join Jiroft County. The 2016 census measured the population of the village as 1,874 people in 471 households. It was the most populous village in its rural district.
