= Gaz Saleh-e Olya =

Village in Kerman, Iran

Gaz Saleh-e Olya گزصالح عليا
- Village
- Location within Iran
- Coordinates: 28°24′14″N 57°43′44″E
- Country: Iran
- Province: Kerman
- County: Anbarabad
- Bakhsh: Esmaili
- Rural District: Hoseynabad

Population (2006)
  - Total: 687
- Time zone: UTC+3:30 (IRST)
  - Summer (DST): UTC+4:30 (IRDT)

Gaz Saleh-e Olya (Persian: گزصالح عليا, also Romanized as Gaz Şāleḩ-e ‘Olyā; also known as Gaz Sala, Gaz Şāleḩ, Gaz Şāleḩ-e Bālā, Gesāleh, Gesāleh-ye Bālā, and Jezsāleh-ye ‘Olyā) is a village in Hoseynabad Rural District, Esmaili District, Anbarabad County, Kerman Province, Iran. At the 2006 census, its population was 687, in 148 families.
