= Ganjabad-e Olya =

Ganjabad-e Olya (Persian: گنج ابادعليا), also known as Ganajabad-e Bala, may refer to:

- Ganjabad-e Olya, East Azerbaijan
- Ganjabad-e Olya, Kerman
