= Jezfatan-e Olya =

Jezfatan-e Olya جزفتن عليا
- Village
- Location within Iran
- Coordinates: 28°14′18″N 57°39′07″E
- Country: Iran
- Province: Kerman
- County: Anbarabad
- Bakhsh: Esmaili
- Rural District: Ganjabad

Population (2006)
  - Total: 758
- Time zone: UTC+3:30 (IRST)
  - Summer (DST): UTC+4:30 (IRDT)

Jezfatan-e Olya (Persian: جزفتن عليا, also Romanized as Jezfaţan-e ‘Olyā) is a village in Ganjabad Rural District, Esmaili District, Anbarabad County, Kerman Province, Iran. At the 2006 census, its population was 758, in 166 families.
