= Fathabad-e Humeh =

Fathabad-e Humeh or Fath Abad Hoomeh (Persian: فتح ابادحومه) may refer to:

- Fathabad-e Humeh, Rafsanjan
- Fathabad-e Humeh, Zarand
