= Hoseynabad-e Zinabad =

Hoseynabad-e Zinabad حسين ابادزين اباد
- Village
- Location within Iran
- Coordinates: 28°17′15″N 57°45′55″E
- Country: Iran
- Province: Kerman
- County: Anbarabad
- Bakhsh: Esmaili
- Rural District: Ganjabad

Population (2006)
  - Total: 320
- Time zone: UTC+3:30 (IRST)
  - Summer (DST): UTC+4:30 (IRDT)

Hoseynabad-e Zinabad (Persian: حسين ابادزين اباد, also romanized as Ḩoseynābād-e Zīnābād; also known as Ḩoseinābād-e Hūmeh, Hosein Abad Hoomeh, Ḩoseynābād, and Ḩoseynābād-e Sheybānī) is a village in Ganjabad Rural District, Esmaili District, Anbarabad County, Kerman Province, Iran. At the 2006 census, its population was 320, in 57 families.
