= Hoseynabad-e Sofla, Kerman =

Neighborhood in Kerman province, Iran

Hoseynabad-e Sofla Persian: حسین‌آباد سفلی
- Neighborhood
- Location within Iran
- Coordinates: 28°13′52″N 57°30′48″E
- Country: Iran
- Province: Kerman
- County: Jiroft
- District: Esmaili
- City: Boluk

Population (2011)
  - Total: 424
- Time zone: UTC+3:30 (IRST)

Hoseynabad-e Sofla (Persian: حسین‌آباد سفلی) (Note: Also romanized as Ḩoseynābād-e Soflá; also known as Ghader Abad, Ḩoseynābād-e Pā’īn, and Qāderābād) is a neighborhood in the city of Boluk in Esmaili District of Jiroft County, Kerman province, Iran.

== Demographics ==
=== Population ===
At the time of the 2006 National Census, Hoseynabad-e Sofla's population was 462 in 100 households, when it was a village in Esmaili Rural District of Anbarabad County. The following census in 2011 counted 424 people in 105 households, by which time the district had been separated from the county to join Jiroft County.

After the census, the village of Boluk merged with the villages of Amirabad, Hoseynabad-e Sofla, and Mohammadabad-e Sofla to become the city of Boluk.
