= Semoran Castle =

Castle in Kerman Province, Iran

Semoran castle
- قلعه سموران

General information
- Type: Castle
- Location: Anbarabad County, Iran

Semoran castle (Persian: قلعه سموران) is a historical castle located in Anbarabad County in Kerman Province, The longevity of this fortress dates back to the Seljuk Empire.
