= Kaviz-e Olya =

Kaviz-e Olya كويزعليا
- Village
- Location within Iran
- Coordinates: 28°20′00″N 58°16′00″E
- Country: Iran
- Province: Kerman
- County: Anbarabad
- Bakhsh: Jebalbarez-e Jonubi
- Rural District: Mardehek

Population (2006)
  - Total: 258
- Time zone: UTC+3:30 (IRST)
  - Summer (DST): UTC+4:30 (IRDT)

Kaviz-e Olya (Persian: كويزعليا, also Romanized as Kavīz-e ‘Olyā; also known as Kāūz Bāla, Kavīr-e Bālā, Kavīz, Kavīz-e Bālā, and Kū’īz) is a village in Mardehek Rural District, Jebalbarez-e Jonubi District, Anbarabad County, Kerman Province, Iran. At the 2006 census, its population was 258, in 59 families.
