= Fatehabad =

Fatehabad may refer to:

== Afghanistan ==
- Fatehabad, Afghanistan

== Bangladesh ==
- Padma Division, formerly Fatehabad

== India ==
- Fatehabad district, a district in Haryana
  - Fatehabad, Haryana, the headquarters town
  - Fatehabad, Haryana Assembly constituency
- Fatehabad Chandrawatiganj, a town in Madhya Pradesh
  - Fatehabad Chandrawatiganj Junction railway station
- Fatehabad, Punjab, a small town
- Fatehabad, Uttar Pradesh, a city
  - Fatehabad, Uttar Pradesh Assembly constituency
- Fatehabad, Raebareli, a village in Uttar Pradesh

== Iran ==
- Fatehabad, Kavar, a village in Fars Province
- Fatehabad, Marvdasht, a village in Fars Province
- Fatehabad, Kurdistan, a village in Kurdistan Province

== See also ==
- Fatehabad Assembly constituency (disambiguation)
- Fathabad (disambiguation)
