= Darui =

Darui may refer to:

- Julien Darui (1916–1987), French footballer
- Darui, Iran, a village in Kerman Province, Iran
