= Ganjabad-e Olya, Kerman =

Ganjabad-e Olya گنج ابادعليا
- Village
- Location within Iran
- Coordinates: 28°17′17″N 57°40′22″E
- Country: Iran
- Province: Kerman
- County: Anbarabad
- Bakhsh: Esmaili
- Rural District: Ganjabad

Population (2006)
  - Total: 371
- Time zone: UTC+3:30 (IRST)
  - Summer (DST): UTC+4:30 (IRDT)

Ganjabad-e Olya (Persian: گنج ابادعليا, also Romanized as Ganjābād-e ‘Olyā; also known as Ganjābād-e Bālā) is a village in Ganjabad Rural District, Esmaili District, Anbarabad County, Kerman Province, Iran. At the 2006 census, its population was 371, in 76 families.
