= Segin =

Segin may refer to:

- Segin, Iran, a village in Kerman Province, Iran
- The modern name of the star Epsilon Cassiopeiae (ε Cassiopeiae)
- An alternative traditional name of the star Gamma Boötis (γ Boötis)
