= Daem =

Daem (Persian: دايم) may refer to:

- Daem, Kerman
- Daem, South Khorasan
