= Tigh Siah, Kerman =

Village in Kerman province, Iran

Tigh Siah Persian: تيغ سياه
- Village
- Location within Iran
- Coordinates: 28°23′51″N 58°16′56″E
- Country: Iran
- Province: Kerman
- County: Anbarabad
- District: Jebalbarez-e Jonubi
- Rural District: Nargesan

Population (2016)
  - Total: 1,034
- Time zone: UTC+3:30 (IRST)

Tigh Siah (Persian: تيغ سياه) (Note: Also romanized as Tīgh Sīāh) is a village in Nargesan Rural District of Jebalbarez-e Jonubi District, Anbarabad County, Kerman province, Iran.

== Demographics ==
=== Population ===
At the time of the 2006 National Census, the village's population was 979 in 210 households. The following census in 2011 counted 1,257 people in 320 households. The 2016 census measured the population of the village as 1,034 people in 301 households. It was the most populous village in its rural district.
