= Malekabad Zakht Castle =

Castle in Kerman Province, Iran

Malekabad Zakht castle
- قلعه ملک‌آباد زاخت

General information
- Type: Castle
- Location: Anbarabad County, Iran

Malekabad Zakht castle (Persian: قلعه ملک‌آباد زاخت) is a historical castle located in Anbarabad County, Kerman Province, which was constructed during the reign of the Seljuk Empire.
