= Boluk =

City in Kerman province, Iran

Boluk Persian: بلوک
- City
- Location within Iran
- Coordinates: 28°13′52″N 57°30′48″E
- Country: Iran
- Province: Kerman
- County: Jiroft
- District: Esmaili

Population (2016)
  - Total: 5,304
- Time zone: UTC+3:30 (IRST)

Boluk (Persian: بلوک) (Note: Also romanized as Bolook and Bolūk; also known as Bilūk and Bolūk-e Pā‘īn) is a city in, and the capital of, Esmaili District of Jiroft County, Kerman province, Iran. It also serves as the administrative center for Esmaili Rural District.

== Demographics ==
=== Population ===
At the time of the 2006 National Census, Boluk's population was 1,792 in 412 households, when it was a village in Esmaili Rural District of Anbarabad County. The following census in 2011 counted 4,070 people in 1,023 households, by which time the district had been separated from the county to join Jiroft County. The 2016 census measured a population of 5,304 people in 1,449 households, when the village had been elevated to the status of a city and had merged with the villages of Amirabad, Hoseynabad-e Sofla, and Mohammadabad-e Sofla.
