= Ganjabad-e Sofla, Kerman =

Ganjabad-e Sofla گنج ابادسفلي
- Village
- Location within Iran
- Coordinates: 28°17′43″N 57°40′02″E
- Country: Iran
- Province: Kerman
- County: Anbarabad
- Bakhsh: Esmaili
- Rural District: Ganjabad

Population (2006)
  - Total: 35
- Time zone: UTC+3:30 (IRST)
  - Summer (DST): UTC+4:30 (IRDT)

Ganjabad-e Sofla (Persian: گنج ابادسفلي, also Romanized as Ganjābād-e Soflá; also known as Ganjābād, Ganjābād-e Pā‘īn, Ganj Abad Hoomeh, Ganjābād Pā‘īn, Ganjīābād, Gonjābād, and Gonjābād-e Pā’īn) is a village in Ganjabad Rural District, Esmaili District, Anbarabad County, Kerman Province, Iran. At the 2006 census, its population was 35, in 7 families.
