= Fatehabad Assembly constituency =

Fatehabad Assembly constituency may refer to these electoral constituencies in India:

- Fatehabad, Haryana Assembly constituency
- Fatehabad, Uttar Pradesh Assembly constituency

== See also ==
- Fatehabad (disambiguation)
