= Rig Sefid, Zagheh =

Rig Sefid ريگسفيد
- Village
- Location within Iran
- Coordinates: 33°28′34″N 48°39′07″E
- Country: Iran
- Province: Lorestan
- County: Khorramabad
- Bakhsh: Zagheh
- Rural District: Zagheh

Population (2006)
  - Total: 59
- Time zone: UTC+3:30 (IRST)
  - Summer (DST): UTC+4:30 (IRDT)

Rig Sefid (Persian: ريگسفيد, also Romanized as Rīg Sefīd and Rīg Safīd; also known as Rīg Asbī, Fatḩābād, and Fatḩābād-e Bālā) is a village in Zagheh Rural District, Zagheh District, Khorramabad County, Lorestan Province, Iran. At the 2006 census, its population was 59, in 16 families.
