= Fathabad-e Olya =

Fathabad-e Olya فتح ابادعليا
- Village
- Location within Iran
- Coordinates: 29°18′26″N 52°10′02″E
- Country: Iran
- Province: Fars
- County: Shiraz
- Bakhsh: Arzhan
- Rural District: Kuh Mareh Sorkhi

Population (2006)
  - Total: 196
- Time zone: UTC+3:30 (IRST)
  - Summer (DST): UTC+4:30 (IRDT)

Fathabad-e Olya (Persian: فتح ابادعليا, also Romanized as Fatḩābād-e 'Olyā) is a village in Kuh Mareh Sorkhi Rural District, Arzhan District, Shiraz County, Fars province, Iran. At the 2006 census, its population was 196, in 40 families.
