= Kavir Rural District =

Kavir Rural District (Persian: دهستان كوير) may refer to:

- Kavir Rural District (Isfahan Province)
- Kavir Rural District (Razavi Khorasan Province)
- Kavir Rural District (Tabas County), South Khorasan province
