= Fathabad-e Jusheqan =

Fathabad-e Jusheqan فتح ابادجوشقان
- Village

- Location within Iran
- Coordinates: 34°03′17″N 51°12′21″E
- Country: Iran
- Province: Isfahan
- County: Kashan
- Bakhsh: Central
- Rural District: Kuhpayeh

Population (2006)
  - Total: 159
- Time zone: UTC+3:30 (IRST)
  - Summer (DST): UTC+4:30 (IRDT)

Fathabad-e Jusheqan (Persian: فتح ابادجوشقان, also Romanized as Fatḩābād-e Jūsheqān; also known as Fatḩābād and Fatḩābād Jūshegān) is a village in Kuhpayeh Rural District, in the Central District of Kashan County, Isfahan Province, Iran. At the 2006 census, its population was 159, in 44 families.
