= Fathabad, Madvarat =

Fathabad فتح اباد
- Village
- Location within Iran
- Coordinates: 30°19′25″N 55°07′12″E
- Country: Iran
- Province: Isfahan
- County: Semirom
- Bakhsh: Central
- Rural District: Vardasht

Population (2006)
  - Total: 166
- Time zone: UTC+3:30 (IRST)
  - Summer (DST): UTC+4:30 (IRDT)

Fathabad (Persian: فتح اباد, also Romanized as Fatḩābād) is a village in Vardasht Rural District, in the Central District of Semirom County, Isfahan Province, Iran. At the 2006 census, its population was 836, in 145 families.
