= Somsili, Hormozgan =

Somsili سمسيلي
- Village
- Location within Iran
- Coordinates: 26°58′24″N 57°27′18″E
- Country: Iran
- Province: Hormozgan
- County: Minab
- Bakhsh: Senderk
- Rural District: Bondar

Population (2006)
  - Total: 144
- Time zone: UTC+3:30 (IRST)
  - Summer (DST): UTC+4:30 (IRDT)

Somsili (Persian: سمسيلي, also Romanized as Somsīlī; also known as Somsarī) is a village in Bondar Rural District, Senderk District, Minab County, Hormozgan Province, Iran. At the 2006 census, its population was 144, in 29 families.
