= Fatehabad, Raebareli =

Fatehabad Fatehābād
- Village
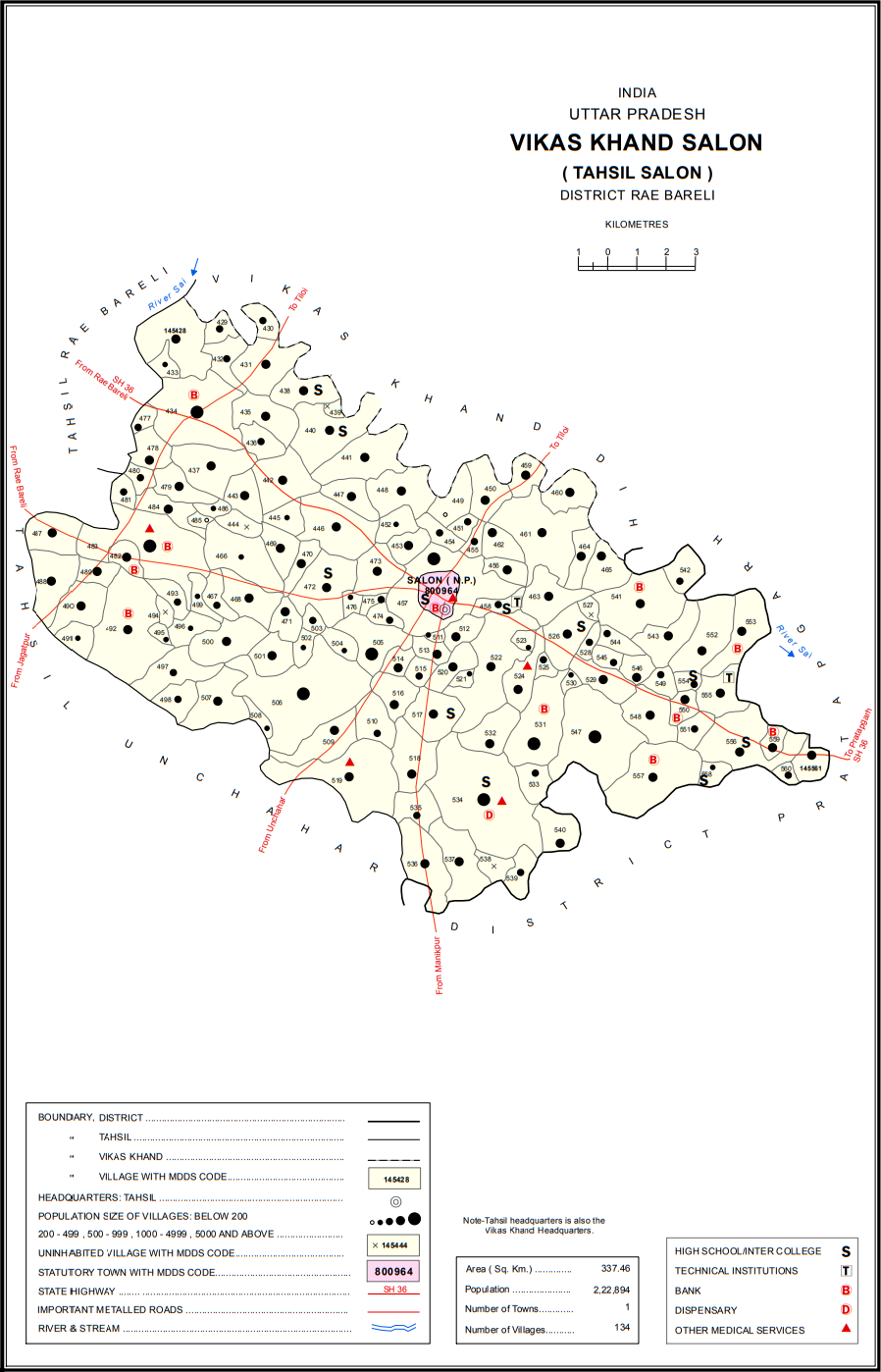
- Map showing Fatehabad (#486) in Salon CD block

- Location in Uttar Pradesh, India
- Coordinates: 26.054009°N 81.371902°E
- Country: India
- State: Uttar Pradesh
- District: Raebareli

Area
  - Total: 0.473 km^{2} (0.183 sq mi)

Population (2011)
  - Total: 489
  - Density: 1,030/km^{2} (2,680/sq mi)

Languages
  - Official: Hindi
- Time zone: UTC+5:30 (IST)
- Vehicle registration: UP-35

Fatehabad is a village in the Salon block of Rae Bareli district, Uttar Pradesh, India. It is located 24 km from Raebareli, the district headquarters. As of 2011, Fatehabad had a population of 489 people, in 76 households. It has no schools and no healthcare facilities, and it does not host a permanent market or a periodic haat.

The 1961 census recorded Fatehabad as comprising 1 hamlet, with a total population of 152 people (75 male and 77 female), in 129 households and 129 physical houses. The area of the village was given as 105 acres.

The 1981 census recorded Fatehabad as having a population of 199 people, in 138 households, and having an area of 42.49 hectares. The main staple foods were given as wheat and rice.
