= Fathabad-e Gorgha =

Fathabad فتح آباد
- Village
- Location within Iran
- Coordinates: 36°35′12″N 59°21′50″E
- Country: Iran
- Province: Razavi Khorasan
- County: Mashhad
- Bakhsh: Central
- Rural District: Miyan Velayat

Population (2006)
  - Total: 81
- Time zone: UTC+3:30 (IRST)
  - Summer (DST): UTC+4:30 (IRDT)

Fathabad (Persian: فتح آباد, also Romanized as Fatḩābād; also known as Kalāteh-ye Gorghā, Kalāteh Gorghā, and Kalāteh-ye Gorg hā Fatḩābād) is a village in Miyan Velayat Rural District, in the Central District of Mashhad County, Razavi Khorasan Province, Iran. At the 2006 census, its population was 81, in 18 families.
