= Ab Sarduiyeh, Rudbar-e Jonubi =

Ab Sarduiyeh ابسردوييه
- Village
- Location within Iran
- Coordinates: 28°05′25″N 57°52′29″E
- Country: Iran
- Province: Kerman
- County: Rudbar-e Jonubi
- Bakhsh: Central
- Rural District: Rudbar

Population (2006)
  - Total: 992
- Time zone: UTC+3:30 (IRST)
  - Summer (DST): UTC+4:30 (IRDT)

Ab Sarduiyeh (Persian: ابسردوييه, also Romanized as Āb Sardū’īyeh; also known as Ābsardīyeh and Tump-i-Ābsardi) is a village in Rudbar Rural District, in the Central District of Rudbar-e Jonubi County, Kerman province, Iran. At the 2006 census, its population was 992, in 197 families.
