= Ganjabad, Miandoab =

Ganjabad گنج اباد
- Village
- Location within Iran
- Coordinates: 36°59′28″N 45°59′28″E
- Country: Iran
- Province: West Azerbaijan
- County: Miandoab
- Bakhsh: Central
- Rural District: Mokriyan-e Shomali

Population (2006)
  - Total: 373
- Time zone: UTC+3:30 (IRST)
  - Summer (DST): UTC+4:30 (IRDT)

Ganjabad (Persian: گنج اباد, also Romanized as Ganjābād) is a village situated in the dense farmland of the Mokriyan-e Shomali Rural District, in the Central District of Miandoab County, West Azerbaijan Province, Iran. At the 2006 census, its population was 373, in 85 families.
