= Fathabad-e Yazdiha =

Fathabad-e Yazdiha فتح اباديزديها
- Village
- Location within Iran
- Coordinates: 36°33′57″N 59°19′04″E
- Country: Iran
- Province: Razavi Khorasan
- County: Mashhad
- Bakhsh: Central
- Rural District: Miyan Velayat

Population (2006)
  - Total: 42
- Time zone: UTC+3:30 (IRST)
  - Summer (DST): UTC+4:30 (IRDT)

Fathabad-e Yazdiha (Persian: فتح اباديزديها, also Romanized as Fatḩābād-e Yazdīhā) is a village in Miyan Velayat Rural District, in the Central District of Mashhad County, Razavi Khorasan Province, Iran. At the 2006 census, its population was 42, in 9 families.
