= Tang Shah, Khuzestan =

Tang Shah تنگ شاه
- Village
- Location within Iran
- Coordinates: 32°05′34″N 49°29′33″E
- Country: Iran
- Province: Khuzestan
- County: Andika
- Bakhsh: Abezhdan
- Rural District: Abezhdan

Population (2006)
  - Total: 512
- Time zone: UTC+3:30 (IRST)
  - Summer (DST): UTC+4:30 (IRDT)

Tang Shah (Persian: تنگ شاه) is a village in Abezhdan Rural District, Abezhdan District, Andika County, Khuzestan Province, Iran. At the 2006 census, its population was 512, in 115 families.
