= Fathabad, Bardaskan =

Fathabad فتح اباد
- Village
- Location within Iran
- Coordinates: 35°25′43″N 57°46′04″E
- Country: Iran
- Province: Razavi Khorasan
- County: Bardaskan
- Bakhsh: Anabad
- Rural District: Sahra

Population (2006)
  - Total: 24
- Time zone: UTC+3:30 (IRST)
  - Summer (DST): UTC+4:30 (IRDT)

Fathabad (Persian: فتح اباد, also Romanized as Fatḩābād and FatḨābād; also known as Khanjarī-ye Bālā) is a village in Sahra Rural District, Anabad District, Bardaskan County, Razavi Khorasan Province, Iran. At the 2006 census, its population was 24, in 11 families.
