= Fathabad, Khorramabad =

Fathabad فتح اباد
- Village
- Location within Iran
- Coordinates: 33°28′24″N 48°39′00″E
- Country: Iran
- Province: Lorestan
- County: Khorramabad
- Bakhsh: Zagheh
- Rural District: Zagheh

Population (2006)
  - Total: 148
- Time zone: UTC+3:30 (IRST)
  - Summer (DST): UTC+4:30 (IRDT)

Fathabad (Persian: فتح اباد, also Romanized as Fatḩābād; also known as Fatḩābād-e Pā’īn) is a village in Zagheh Rural District, Zagheh District, Khorramabad County, Lorestan Province, Iran. At the 2006 census, its population was 148, in 36 families.
