= Ab Bordeh, Jiroft =

Ab Bordeh اببرده
- Village
- Location within Iran
- Coordinates: 29°03′26″N 57°34′47″E
- Country: Iran
- Province: Kerman
- County: Jiroft
- Bakhsh: Sarduiyeh
- Rural District: Dalfard

Population (2006)
  - Total: 86
- Time zone: UTC+3:30 (IRST)
  - Summer (DST): UTC+4:30 (IRDT)

Ab Bordeh (Persian: اببرده, also Romanized as Āb Bordeh) is a village in Dalfard Rural District, Sarduiyeh District, Jiroft County, Kerman Province, Iran. At the 2006 census, its population was 86, in 13 families.
