= Tigh Siah, Hormozgan =

Tigh Siah تيغ سياه
- Village
- Location within Iran
- Coordinates: 27°00′41″N 57°32′30″E
- Country: Iran
- Province: Hormozgan
- County: Minab
- Bakhsh: Senderk
- Rural District: Bondar

Population (2006)
  - Total: 60
- Time zone: UTC+3:30 (IRST)
  - Summer (DST): UTC+4:30 (IRDT)

Tigh Siah (Persian: تيغ سياه, also Romanized as Tīgh Sīāh; also known as Tīk-e Sīāh, Tīk Seyāh, and Tīk Sīāh) is a village in Bondar Rural District, Senderk District, Minab County, Hormozgan Province, Iran. At the 2006 census, its population was 60, in 11 families.
