= Ganjabad-e Yek =

Ganjabad-e Yek گنج اباد1
- Village
- Location within Iran
- Coordinates: 27°50′36″N 57°55′33″E
- Country: Iran
- Province: Kerman
- County: Qaleh Ganj
- Bakhsh: Central
- Rural District: Sorkh Qaleh

Population (2006)
  - Total: 956
- Time zone: UTC+3:30 (IRST)
  - Summer (DST): UTC+4:30 (IRDT)

Ganjabad-e Yek (Persian: گنج اباد1, also Romanized as Ganjābād-e Yek; also known as Ganjābād) is a village in Sorkh Qaleh Rural District, in the Central District of Qaleh Ganj County, Kerman Province, Iran. At the 2006 census, its population was 956, in 209 families.
