= Mardehek =

City in Kerman province, Iran

Mardehek Persian: مردهك
- City
- Location within Iran
- Coordinates: 28°21′03″N 58°09′31″E
- Country: Iran
- Province: Kerman
- County: Anbarabad
- District: Jebalbarez-e Jonubi

Population (2016)
  - Total: 2,870
- Time zone: UTC+3:30 (IRST)

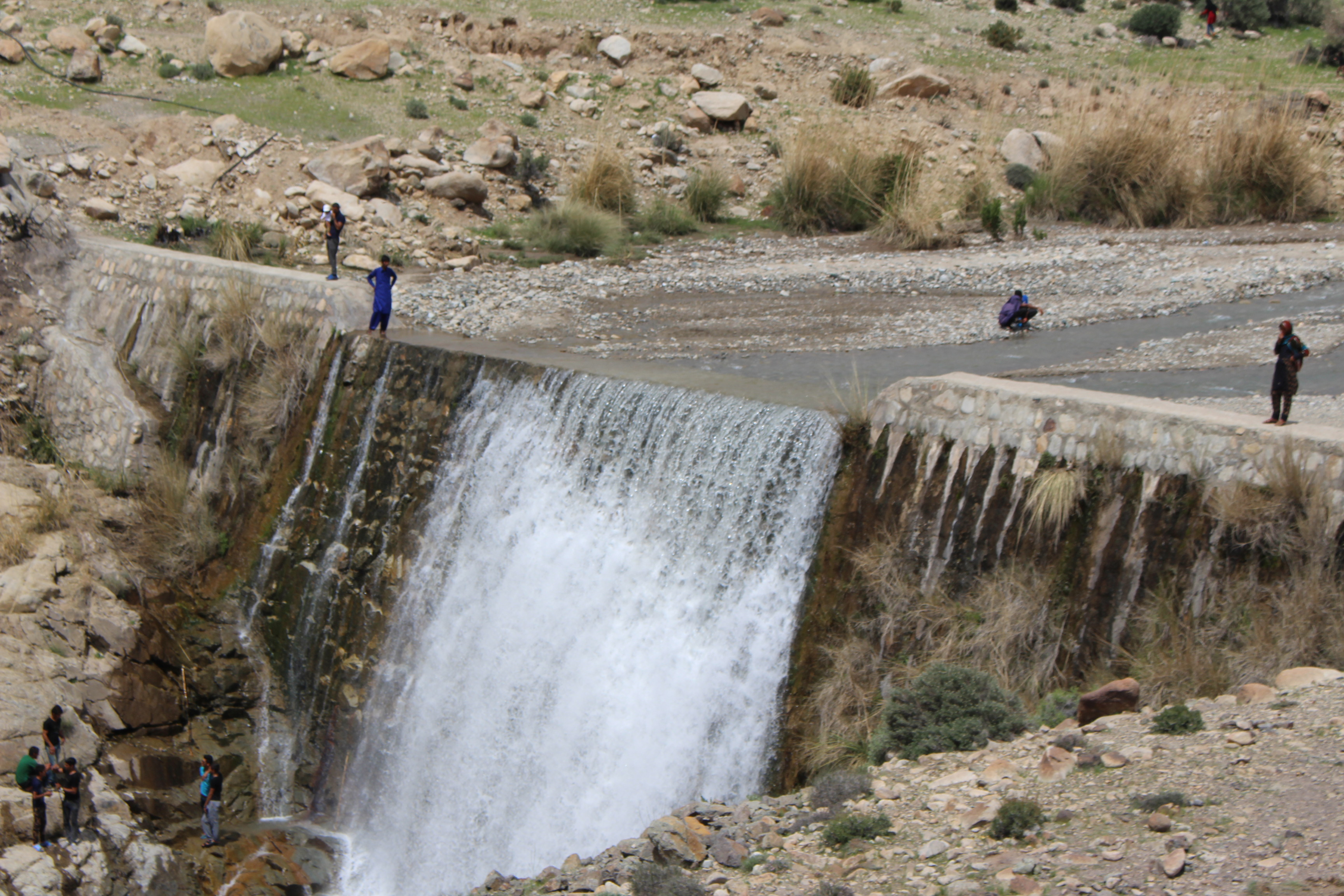

Mardehek (Persian: مردهك) (Note: Also romanized as Mardehak and Mardehk; also known as Mardeh) is a city in, and the capital of, Jebalbarez-e Jonubi District of Anbarabad County, Kerman province, Iran. It also serves as the administrative center for Mardehek Rural District.

== Demographics ==
=== Population ===
At the time of the 2006 National Census, the city's population was 1,912 in 407 households. The following census in 2011 counted 2,904 people in 599 households. The 2016 census measured the population of the city as 2,870 people in 746 households.
