= Fathabad, Darab =

Fathabad فتح اباد
- Village
- Location within Iran
- Coordinates: 28°35′33″N 54°45′09″E
- Country: Iran
- Province: Fars
- County: Darab
- Bakhsh: Central
- Rural District: Qaleh Biyaban

Population (2006)
  - Total: 1,444
- Time zone: UTC+3:30 (IRST)
  - Summer (DST): UTC+4:30 (IRDT)

Fathabad (Persian: فتح اباد, also Romanized as Fatḩābād) is a village in Qaleh Biyaban Rural District, in the Central District of Darab County, Fars province, Iran. At the 2006 census, its population was 1,444, in 333 families.
