= Abd ol Majid =

Abd ol Majid عبدالمجيد
- Village
- Location within Iran
- Coordinates: 35°55′48″N 59°33′33″E
- Country: Iran
- Province: Razavi Khorasan
- County: Mashhad
- Bakhsh: Ahmadabad
- Rural District: Sarjam

Population (2006)
  - Total: 124
- Time zone: UTC+3:30 (IRST)
  - Summer (DST): UTC+4:30 (IRDT)

Abd ol Majid (Persian: عبدالمجيد, also Romanized as ‘Abd ol Majīd; also known as Fatḩābād) is a village in Sarjam Rural District, Ahmadabad District, Mashhad County, Razavi Khorasan Province, Iran. At the 2006 census, its population was 124, in 34 families.

== See also ==
- List of cities, towns and villages in Razavi Khorasan Province
