= Rud Ab District =

Rud Ab District may refer to:

- Rud Ab District (Narmashir County), Kerman province
- Rud Ab District (Razavi Khorasan Province)
