= Fathabad, Neyriz =

Fathabad فتح اباد
- Village
- Country: Iran
- Province: Fars
- County: Neyriz
- Bakhsh: Qatruyeh
- Rural District: Rizab

Population (2006)
  - Total: 197
- Time zone: UTC+3:30 (IRST)
  - Summer (DST): UTC+4:30 (IRDT)

Fathabad (Persian: فتح اباد, also Romanized as Fatḩābād) is a village in Rizab Rural District, Qatruyeh District, Neyriz County, Fars province, Iran. At the 2006 census, its population was 197, in 43 families.
