= Fathabad, Rudbar-e Jonubi =

Fathabad فتح اباد
- Village
- Location within Iran
- Coordinates: 28°07′25″N 58°24′40″E
- Country: Iran
- Province: Kerman
- County: Rudbar-e Jonubi
- Bakhsh: Jazmurian
- Rural District: Kuhestan

Population (2006)
  - Total: 53
- Time zone: UTC+3:30 (IRST)
  - Summer (DST): UTC+4:30 (IRDT)

Fathabad (Persian: فتح اباد, also Romanized as Fatḩābād; also known as Fatḩābād-e ‘Olyā) is a village in Kuhestan Rural District, Jazmurian District, Rudbar-e Jonubi County, Kerman Province, Iran. At the 2006 census, its population was 53, in 15 families.
