= Fathabad, Rafsanjan =

Fathabad فتح اباد
- village
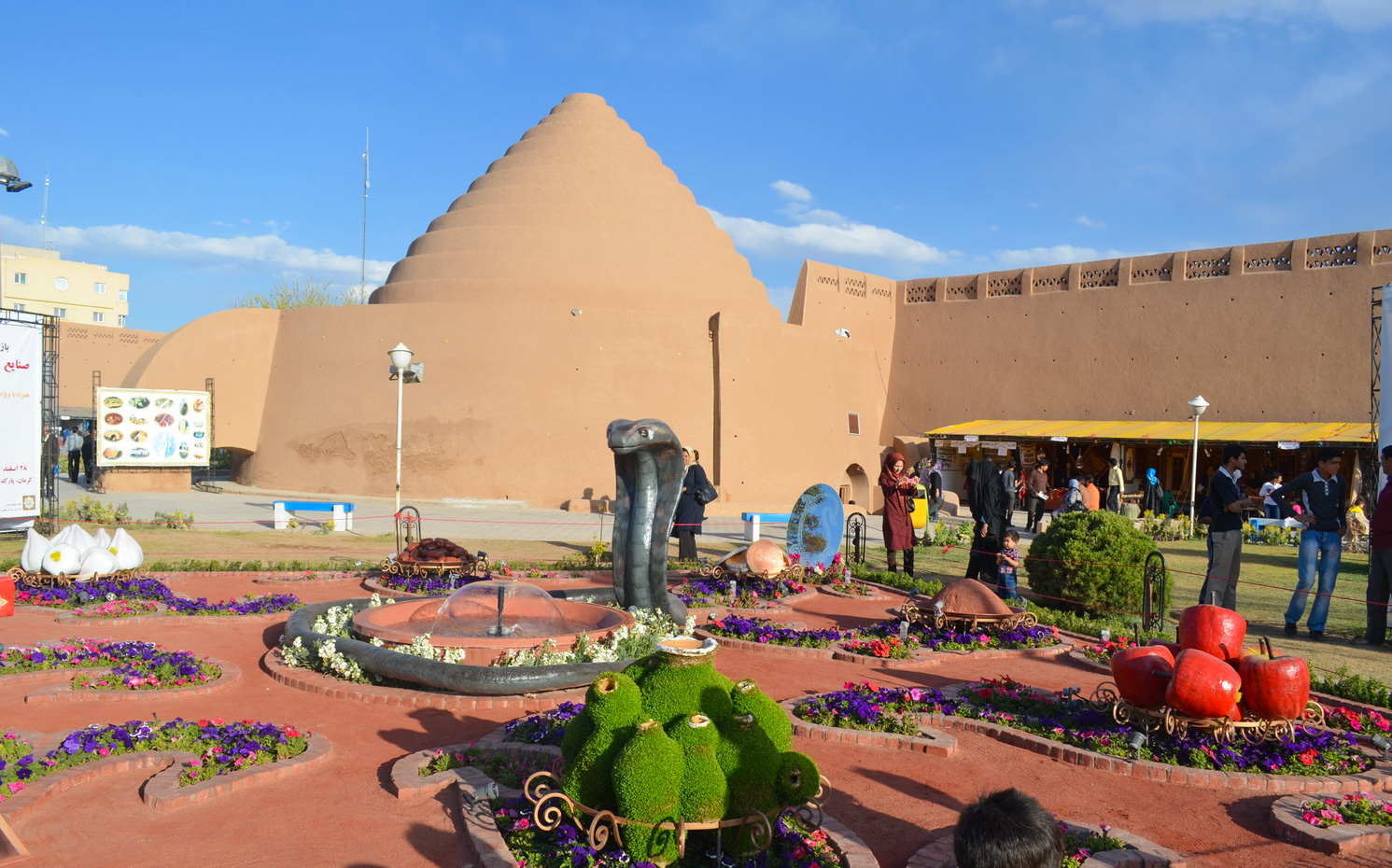
- Photograph of a building found in Fathabad.

- Location within Iran
- Coordinates: 30°24′56″N 56°04′00″E
- Country: Iran
- Province: Kerman
- County: Rafsanjan
- Bakhsh: Central
- Rural District: Qasemabad

Population (2006)
  - Total: 782
- Time zone: UTC+3:30 (IRST)
  - Summer (DST): UTC+4:30 (IRDT)

Fathabad (Persian: فتح اباد, also Romanized as Fathābād; also known as Bongeh-ye Fatḩābād, Fatḩābād-e Ḩūmeh, Fatḩābād-e Sardār, and Fath Abad Hoomeh) is a village in Qasemabad Rural District, in the Central District of Rafsanjan County, Kerman Province, Iran. At the 2006 census, its population was 782, in 195 families.
