= Fathabad, Vahdat =

Fathabad فتح اباد
- Village
- Location within Iran
- Coordinates: 30°43′43″N 56°38′31″E
- Country: Iran
- Province: Kerman
- County: Zarand
- Bakhsh: Central
- Rural District: Vahdat

Population (2006)
  - Total: 853
- Time zone: UTC+3:30 (IRST)
  - Summer (DST): UTC+4:30 (IRDT)

Fathabad (Persian: فتح اباد, also Romanized as Fatḩābād; also known as Fatḩābād-e Hūmeh, Fat-h Abad Hoomeh, Howmeh, and Hūmeh) is a village in Vahdat Rural District, in the Central District of Zarand County, Kerman Province, Iran. At the 2006 census, its population was 853, in 202 families.
