= Ganjabad-e Olya, East Azerbaijan =

Ganjabad-e Olya گنج ابادعليا
- Village
- Location within Iran
- Coordinates: 37°24′31″N 46°45′02″E
- Country: Iran
- Province: East Azerbaijan
- County: Hashtrud
- Bakhsh: Nazarkahrizi
- Rural District: Nazarkahrizi

Population (2006)
  - Total: 142
- Time zone: UTC+3:30 (IRST)
  - Summer (DST): UTC+4:30 (IRDT)

Ganjabad-e Olya (Persian: گنج ابادعليا, also Romanized as Ganjābād-e ‘Olyā; also known as Ganjābād-e Bālā) is a village in Nazarkahrizi Rural District, Nazarkahrizi District, Hashtrud County, East Azerbaijan Province, Iran. At the 2006 census, its population was 142, in 23 families.
