= Hoseynabad-e Ali Akbarkhan =

Hoseynabad-e Ali Akbarkhan حسين ابادعلي اكبرخان
- Village
- Location within Iran
- Coordinates: 30°26′59″N 56°01′21″E
- Country: Iran
- Province: Kerman
- County: Rafsanjan
- Bakhsh: Central
- Rural District: Azadegan

Population (2006)
  - Total: 109
- Time zone: UTC+3:30 (IRST)
  - Summer (DST): UTC+4:30 (IRDT)

Hoseynabad-e Ali Akbarkhan (Persian: حسين ابادعلي اكبرخان, also Romanized as Ḩoseynābād-e ‘Alī Akbarkhān; also known as Ḩoseynābād, Ḩoseynābād-e Pā’īn, Ḩoseynābād-e Soflá, and Husainābād) is a village in Azadegan Rural District, in the Central District of Rafsanjan County, Kerman Province, Iran. At the 2006 census, its population was 109, in 30 families.
