= Ganjabad-e Do =

Ganjabad-e Do گنج اباد2
- Village
- Location within Iran
- Coordinates: 27°53′10″N 57°54′10″E
- Country: Iran
- Province: Kerman
- County: Qaleh Ganj
- Bakhsh: Central
- Rural District: Sorkh Qaleh

Population (2006)
  - Total: 475
- Time zone: UTC+3:30 (IRST)
  - Summer (DST): UTC+4:30 (IRDT)

Ganjabad-e Do (Persian: گنج اباد2, also Romanized as Ganjābād-e Do; also known as Ganjābād, Ganjābād-e Kahnūj, Ganjābād-e Pā’īn, and Ganj Abad Kahnooj) is a village in Sorkh Qaleh Rural District, in the Central District of Qaleh Ganj County, Kerman Province, Iran. At the 2006 census, its population was 475, in 102 families.
