= Ganjabad-e Sofla, East Azerbaijan =

Ganjabad-e Sofla گنج ابادسفلي
- Village
- Location within Iran
- Coordinates: 37°24′47″N 46°45′55″E
- Country: Iran
- Province: East Azerbaijan
- County: Hashtrud
- Bakhsh: Nazarkahrizi
- Rural District: Nazarkahrizi

Population (2006)
  - Total: 123
- Time zone: UTC+3:30 (IRST)
  - Summer (DST): UTC+4:30 (IRDT)

Ganjabad-e Sofla (Persian: گنج ابادسفلي, also Romanized as Ganjābād-e Soflá; also known as Ganjābād-e Pā‘īn) is a village in Nazarkahrizi Rural District, Nazarkahrizi District, Hashtrud County, East Azerbaijan Province, Iran. At the 2006 census, its population was 123, in 21 families.
