= Hoseynabad Rural District (Jiroft County) =

Rural district in Kerman province, Iran

Hoseynabad Rural District Persian: دهستان حسين آباد
- Rural District
- Location within Iran
- Coordinates: 28°26′11″N 57°41′33″E
- Country: Iran
- Province: Kerman
- County: Jiroft
- District: Esmaili
- Capital: Karimabad-e Sofla

Population (2016)
  - Total: 17,449
- Time zone: UTC+3:30 (IRST)

Hoseynabad Rural District (Persian: دهستان حسين آباد) is in Esmaili District of Jiroft County, Kerman province, Iran. Its capital is the village of Karimabad-e Sofla.

== Demographics ==
=== Population ===
At the time of the 2006 National Census, the rural district's population (as a part of Anbarabad County) was 15,890 in 3,265 households. There were 17,661 inhabitants in 4,213 households at the following census of 2011, by which time the district had been separated from the county to join Jiroft County. The 2016 census measured the population of the rural district as 17,449 in 4,971 households. The most populous of its 35 villages was Hoseynabad-e Dehdar, with 2,886 people.
