= Esmaili Rural District =

Rural district in Kerman province, Iran

Esmaili Rural District Persian: دهستان اسماعیلی
- Rural District
- Location within Iran
- Coordinates: 28°18′15″N 57°31′03″E
- Country: Iran
- Province: Kerman
- County: Jiroft
- District: Esmaili
- Capital: Boluk

Population (2016)
  - Total: 9,056
- Time zone: UTC+3:30 (IRST)

Esmaili Rural District (Persian: دهستان اسماعیلی) is in Esmaili District of Jiroft County, Kerman province, Iran. It is administered from the city of Boluk.

== Demographics ==
=== Population ===
At the time of the 2006 National Census, the rural district's population (as a part of Anbarabad County) was 11,745 in 2,485 households. There were 14,450 inhabitants in 3,629 households at the following census of 2011, by which time the district had been separated from the county to join Jiroft County. The 2016 census measured the population of the rural district as 9,056 in 2,780 households. The most populous of its 62 villages was Esmaili-ye Sofla, with 2,355 people.
