= Mardehek Rural District =

Rural district in Kerman province, Iran

Mardehek Rural District Persian: دهستان مردهك
- Rural District
- Location within Iran
- Coordinates: 28°15′52″N 58°06′16″E
- Country: Iran
- Province: Kerman
- County: Anbarabad
- District: Jebalbarez-e Jonubi
- Capital: Mardehek

Population (2016)
  - Total: 8,112
- Time zone: UTC+3:30 (IRST)

Mardehek Rural District (Persian: دهستان مردهك) is in Jebalbarez-e Jonubi District of Anbarabad County, Kerman province, Iran. It is administered from the city of Mardehek.

== Demographics ==
=== Population ===
At the time of the 2006 National Census, the rural district's population was 7,785 in 1,576 households. There were 10,820 inhabitants in 2,471 households at the following census of 2011. The 2016 census measured the population of the rural district as 8,112 in 2,247 households. The most populous of its 39 villages was Hajjiabad, with 2,356 people.
