= Ganjabad Rural District =

Rural district in Kerman province, Iran

Ganjabad Rural District Persian: دهستان گنج آباد
- Rural District
- Location within Iran
- Coordinates: 28°18′13″N 57°40′17″E
- Country: Iran
- Province: Kerman
- County: Jiroft
- District: Esmaili
- Capital: Dehnow-e Fath ol Mobin

Population (2016)
  - Total: 10,977
- Time zone: UTC+3:30 (IRST)

Ganjabad Rural District (Persian: دهستان گنج آباد) is in Esmaili District of Jiroft County, Kerman province, Iran. Its capital is the village of Dehnow-e Fath ol Mobin.

== Demographics ==
=== Population ===
At the time of the 2006 National Census, the rural district's population (as a part of Anbarabad County) was 9,427 in 1,969 households. There were 9,852 inhabitants in 2,494 households at the following census of 2011, by which time the district had been separated from the county to join Jiroft County. The 2016 census measured the population of the rural district as 10,977 in 3,189 households. The most populous of its 56 villages was Terj, with 1,874 people.
