= Nargesan Rural District =

Rural district in Kerman province, Iran

Nargesan Rural District Persian: دهستان نرگسان
- Rural District
- Location within Iran
- Coordinates: 28°21′20″N 58°24′25″E
- Country: Iran
- Province: Kerman
- County: Anbarabad
- District: Jebalbarez-e Jonubi
- Capital: Kalejak

Population (2016)
  - Total: 5,652
- Time zone: UTC+3:30 (IRST)

Nargesan Rural District (Persian: دهستان نرگسان) is in Jebalbarez-e Jonubi District of Anbarabad County, Kerman province, Iran. Its capital is the village of Kalejak.

== Demographics ==
=== Population ===
At the time of the 2006 National Census, the rural district's population was 6,547 in 1,372 households. There were 7,011 inhabitants in 1,681 households at the following census of 2011. The 2016 census measured the population of the rural district as 5,652 in 1,515 households. The most populous of its 60 villages was Tigh Siah, with 1,034 people.
