= Garmsar Rural District =

Rural district in Kerman province, Iran

Garmsar Rural District Persian: دهستان گرمسار
- Rural District
- Location within Iran
- Coordinates: 28°28′18″N 58°10′40″E
- Country: Iran
- Province: Kerman
- County: Anbarabad
- District: Jebalbarez-e Jonubi
- Capital: Garm Salar Reza

Population (2016)
  - Total: 7,613
- Time zone: UTC+3:30 (IRST)

Garmsar Rural District (Persian: دهستان گرمسار) is in Jebalbarez-e Jonubi District of Anbarabad County, Kerman province, Iran. Its capital is the village of Garm Salar Reza.

== Demographics ==
=== Population ===
At the time of the 2006 National Census, the rural district's population was 7,668 in 1,575 households. There were 7,822 inhabitants in 1,803 households at the following census of 2011. The 2016 census measured the population of the rural district as 7,613 in 2,087 households. The most populous of its 111 villages was Gazabad, with 815 people.
