= Esmaili District =

District in Kerman province, Iran

Esmaili District Persian: بخش اسماعیلی
- District
- Location within Iran
- Coordinates: 28°18′40″N 57°36′12″E
- Country: Iran
- Province: Kerman
- County: Jiroft
- Capital: Boluk

Population (2016)
  - Total: 42,786
- Time zone: UTC+3:30 (IRST)

Esmaili District (Persian: بخش اسماعیلی) is in Jiroft County, Kerman province, Iran. Its capital is the city of Boluk.

== Demographics ==
=== Population ===
At the time of the 2006 census, the district's population (as a part of Anbarabad County) was 37,062 in 7,719 households. The following census in 2011 counted 41,963 people in 10,336 households, by which time the district had been separated from the county to join Jiroft County. The 2016 census measured the population of the district as 42,786 inhabitants in 12,389 households.

=== Administrative divisions ===
Esmaili District Population (Note: As a part of Anbarabad County at the 2006 census)
Administrative Divisions	2006	2011	2016
Esmaili RD	11,745	14,450	9,056
Ganjabad RD	9,427	9,852	10,977
Hoseynabad RD	15,890	17,661	17,449
Boluk (city)			5,304
Total	37,062	41,963	42,786
RD = Rural District
