= Jebalbarez-e Jonubi District =

District in Kerman province, Iran

Jebalbarez-e Jonubi District Persian: بخش جبال‌بارز جنوبی
- District
- Location within Iran
- Coordinates: 28°21′36″N 58°14′20″E
- Country: Iran
- Province: Kerman
- County: Anbarabad
- Capital: Mardehek

Population (2016)
  - Total: 24,247
- Time zone: UTC+3:30 (IRST)

Jebalbarez-e Jonubi District (Persian: بخش جبال‌بارز جنوبی) is in Anbarabad County, Kerman province, Iran. Its capital is the city of Mardehek.

== Demographics ==
=== Population ===
At the time of the 2006 National Census, the district's population was 23,912 in 4,930 households. The following census in 2011 counted 28,557 people in 6,554 households. The 2016 census measured the population of the district as 24,247 inhabitants in 6,595 households.

=== Administrative divisions ===
Jebalbarez-e Jonubi District Population
Administrative Divisions	2006	2011	2016
Garmsar RD	7,668	7,822	7,613
Mardehek RD	7,785	10,820	8,112
Nargesan RD	6,547	7,011	5,652
Mardehek (city)	1,912	2,904	2,870
Total	23,912	28,557	24,247
RD = Rural District
