= Anbarabad County =

County in Kerman province, Iran

Anbarabad County Persian: شهرستان عنبرآباد
- County
- Location of Anbarabad County in Kerman province (center right, purple)

- Location of Kerman province in Iran
- Coordinates: 28°28′N 57°58′E
- Country: Iran
- Province: Kerman
- Capital: Anbarabad
- Districts: Central, Jebalbarez-e Jonubi

Population (2016)
  - Total: 82,438
- Time zone: UTC+3:30 (IRST)

Anbarabad County (Persian: شهرستان عنبرآباد) is in Kerman province, Iran. Its capital is the city of Anbarabad.

== History ==
In 2003, parts of Jiroft County were separated from it in the establishment of Anbarabad County, which was divided into three districts. After the 2006 National Census, the village of Dowsari was elevated to the status of a city, and Esmaili District was separated from the county to rejoin Jiroft County.

== Demographics ==
=== Language ===
Most residents are ethnic Persians and speak that language.

=== Population ===
At the time of the 2006 census, the county's population was 113,751 in 23,858 households. The following census in 2011 counted 85,942 people in 20,947 households. The 2016 census measured the population of the county as 82,438 in 23,409 households.

=== Administrative divisions ===
Anbarabad County's population history and administrative structure over three consecutive censuses are shown in the following table.

Anbarabad County Population
Administrative Divisions	2006	2011	2016
Central District	52,777	57,385	58,191
Aliabad RD	7,968	10,312	10,635
Amjaz RD	3,970	3,450	2,951
Jahadabad RD	16,891	15,106	16,258
Mohammadabad RD	5,358	6,024	6,032
Anbarabad (city)	18,590	18,731	18,185
Dowsari (city)		3,762	4,130
Esmaili District (Note: Transferred to Jiroft County)	37,062		
Esmaili RD	11,745		
Ganjabad RD	9,427		
Hoseynabad RD	15,890		
Jebalbarez-e Jonubi District	23,912	28,557	24,247
Garmsar RD	7,668	7,822	7,613
Mardehek RD	7,785	10,820	8,112
Nargesan RD	6,547	7,011	5,652
Mardehek (city)	1,912	2,904	2,870
Total	113,751	85,942	82,438
RD = Rural District

== See also ==
Media related to Anbarabad County at Wikimedia Commons
