= Poshteh =

Poshteh (Persian: پشته) may refer to:

- Poshteh, Chaharmahal and Bakhtiari
- Poshteh, Rudbar, Gilan Province
- Poshteh, Talesh, Gilan Province
- Poshteh, Kerman
- Poshteh, Kurdistan
- Poshteh, Razavi Khorasan
- Poshteh Karun
- Poshteh Konji
- Poshteh Shahan
- Poshteh Shiran
- Poshteh Shiraniha
- Poshteh Talang
- Poshteh-ye Ahmadabad
- Poshteh-ye Barjan
- Poshteh-ye Gish
- Poshteh-ye Gurband
- Poshteh-ye Isin
- Poshteh-ye Kol Kol
- Poshteh-ye Mazaj
- Poshteh Mivaleh-ye Olya
- Poshteh-ye Mowla
- Poshteh-ye Olya
- Poshteh-ye Sofla
- Poshteh-ye Yek
