= Asiab =

Asiab or Asiyab or Asyab (Persian: اسياب), meaning mill, may refer to the places:

- Asiab-e Kereshki, Fars Province
- Asiab-e Saran, Gilan Province
- Asiab Darreh, Gilan Province
- Asiab Sham, Gilan Province
- Asiab, Hormozgan
- Asiyab-e Kohneh, Isfahan Province
- Asiyab-e Alikhan, Kerman Province
- Asiyab-e Mir Naser, Kerman Province
- Asiab-e Shah Teymur, Kerman Province
- Asiyab Ostad, Kerman Province
- Asiyab-e Qazi, Kerman Province
- Asiab-e Tanureh, Kermanshah Province
- Asiab, Masjed Soleyman, Khuzestan Province
- Asiab, Omidiyeh, Khuzestan Province
- Asiyab-e Shekasteh, Khuzestan Province
- Asiab Rural District, in Omidiyeh County, Khuzestan Province
- Asiab, Kurdistan
- Asiab Barq, Kurdistan Province
- Asiab Kikhosrow, Kurdistan Province
- Asyab Qashqa, Razavi Khorasan Province
- Tepe Asiab, a Neolithic archaeological site (c. 8500-8000 BC) in the Zagros Mountains, near Kermanshah, Iran
