= Taherabad =

Taherabad or Tahrabad (Persian: طاهراباد) may refer to:

== Isfahan Province ==
- Taherabad, Kashan, a village in Kashan County
- Taherabad, Natanz, a village in Natanz County

== Kerman Province ==
- Taherabad, Kerman

== Kermanshah Province ==
- Taherabad, Kangavar, a village in Kangavar County
- Taherabad, Sahneh, a village in Sahneh County
- Taherabad, Sonqor, a village in Sonqor County

== Khuzestan Province ==
- Taherabad, Andika, a village in Andika County
- Taherabad, Lali, a village in Lali County

== Mazandaran Province ==
- Taherabad, Mazandaran, a village in Sari County

== Razavi Khorasan Province ==
- Taherabad, Chenaran, a village in Chenaran County
- Taherabad-e Barbaryeha, a village in Kalat County
- Taherabad-e Mian, a village in Kalat County
- Taherabad-e Torkha, a village in Kalat County
- Taherabad-e Torkha Jadid, a village in Kalat County
- Taherabad, Mashhad, a village in Mashhad County
- Taherabad, Nishapur, a village in Nishapur County
- Taherabad, Torbat-e Heydarieh, a village in Torbat-e Heydarieh County

== Tehran Province ==
- Taherabad, Tehran
- Taherabad, Varamin, Tehran

== West Azerbaijan Province ==
- Taherabad, Bukan, a village in Bukan County
- Taherabad, Chaypareh, a village in Chaypareh County

== Zanjan Province ==
- Taherabad, Zanjan
