= Pa Godar =

Pa Godar or Pagodar or Pa-ye Godar or Pagdar (Persian: پاگدار) may refer to:

- Pagodar, Anbarabad, Kerman Province
- Pagodar, Faryab, Kerman Province
- Pagodar, Jiroft, Kerman Province
- Pagodar-e Amjaz, Kerman Province
- Pa Godar, Razavi Khorasan
- Pagodar-e Badvar
