= Fazelabad =

Fazelabad or Fazlabad or Fazilabad (Persian: فاضل‌آباد) may refer to:

- Fayzabad, Badakhshan, Afghanistan
- Fazelabad, Golestan, Iran
- Fazelabad, Azadshahr, Golestan Province, Iran
- Fazelabad, Ilam, Iran
- Fazlabad, Isfahan, Iran
- Fazelabad-e Talkhab, Kohgiluyeh and Boyer-Ahmad Province, Iran
- Fazelabad, Lorestan, Iran
- Fazlabad, Markazi, Iran
- Fazelabad, Razavi Khorasan
- Fazlabad, Dargaz, Razavi Khorasan Province, Iran
- Fazlabad, Sabzevar, Razavi Khorasan Province, Iran
- Fazelabad, South Khorasan, Iran
- Fazlabad, South Khorasan, Iran
- Fazlabad-e Sofla, Yazd Province, Iran
