= Sar Jangal =

Sar Jangal (Persian: سرجنگل) may refer to:

- Sar Jangal, Anbarabad, Kerman province
- Sar Jangal, Bam, Kerman province
- Sar Jangal, Rezvan, Jiroft County, Kerman province
- Sar Jangal, Rudbar-e Jonubi, Kerman province
- Sar Jangal, Razavi Khorasan
- Sar Jangal, Zahedan, Sistan and Baluchestan province
