= Iran–Turkmenistan border =

International border

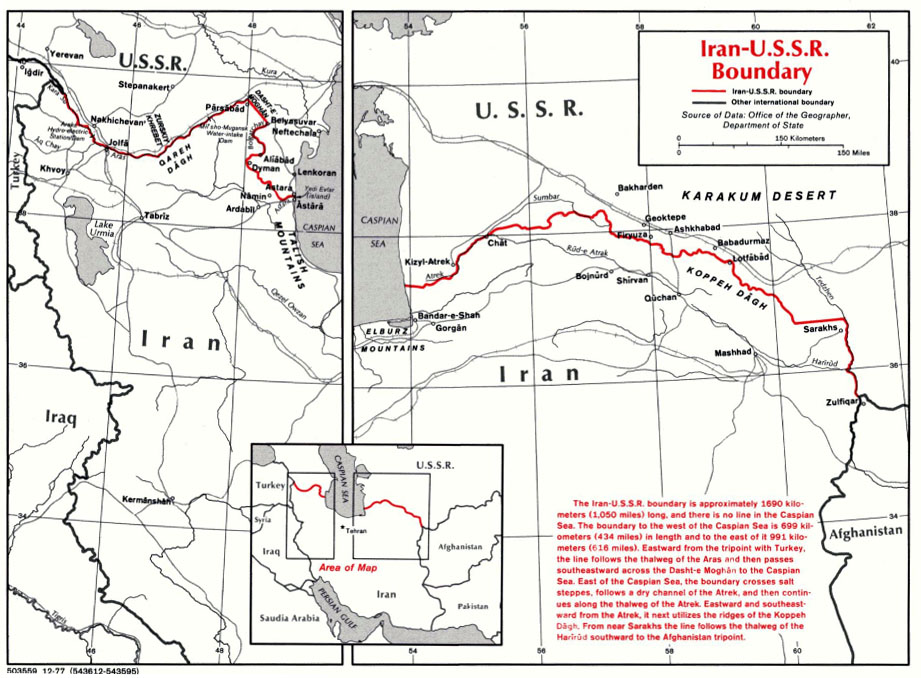
Map of the Iran–Soviet Union border; the entire eastern section now forms the Iran–Turkmenistan border

Iranian and Turkmen boundary markers

The Iran–Turkmenistan border is the national border separating the countries of Iran and Turkmenistan. It is 1,148 km (713 miles) in length and runs from the Caspian Sea to the tripoint with Afghanistan. The Turkmen capital Ashgabat is only 24 kilometres (15 mi) north of this boundary, and Mashhad (Iran's second largest city) is 75.5 kilometres (46.9 mi) south of it.

== Description ==
The border starts at the Caspian coast just to the south of the Turkmen town of Esenguly. It then goes overland in an eastwards directions in a series of straight lines through barren salt flats for 50 km (31 mi) until reaching the Atrek river, the course of which it follows for 124 km (77 mi) to a point just south of the Turkmen village of Chat. The border then continues overland eastwards/north-eastwards across the Kopet Dag mountain range for 151 km (94 mi) before reaching the Sumbar river, the course of which it then follows for 41 km (26 mi). It then continues overland across mountain ridges in a broadly south-eastern arc for 455 km (283 mi) to the vicinity of the Iranian village of Chahchaheh. From here a roughly straight line section runs for 77 km (48m) to the Harirud river (Tedzhen in Turkmen), the course of which it follows south for 120 km (75 mi) to the Afghan tripoint.

The immediate border area is largely uninhabited, except for the central section around Ashgabat on the Turkmen side; this area of the border, plus the western section, is roughly paralleled by highways. The Turkmen section of the Trans-Caspian Railway also roughly parallels the frontier in the central section, coming less than half a mile north of the boundary in the vicinity of Lotfabad. On the Iranian side, roughly 50 miles south of the border runs the major highways connecting the towns of Gorgan, Bojnord and Mashhad, with roads connecting the smaller towns to the north.

== History ==
The border largely took its current shape during the 19th century after the Russian conquest of Central Asia and its annexation of the Khanate of Kokand and the Emirate of Bukhara in 1865–68. In 1869, Qajar Iran and Imperial Russia agreed that the Atrek river would be the border between them. This boundary was confirmed and then extended eastwards to the vicinity of Ashgabat in 1881 following further Russian advances into Turkmen lands, and then to the border with Afghanistan in 1893; various further delimitations of this border occurred in the following years. Further small changes were made in the period 1954–57 when Pahlavi Iran and the Soviet Union (as they now were) agreed to more clearly demarcate their common border, including the Atrek delta region which had since altered due to the shrinking of the Caspian Sea.

== Border crossings ==
Persian name	Turkmen name	Type of crossing
Ashk Tappeh	Ak-Yayla	railway
Incheh Borun	Altyn Asyr, Gudri-Olum	road
Bajgiran	Gaudan	road
Lotfabad	Artyk	road
Sarakhs	Sarahs	road and railway

== Settlements near the border ==
=== Iran ===
- Gomishan
- Incheh Borun
- Bachcheh Darreh
- Hesarcheh
- Robat
- Shuy
- Lotfabad
- Now Khandan
- Dargaz
- Giru
- Koshtani
- Qarah Takan (Razavi Khorasan)
- Chahchaheh
- Alamtu
- Sarakhs
- Shir Tappeh
- Jannatabad

=== Turkmenistan ===
- Ashgabat
- Esenguly
- Ajyyap
- Gyzyletrek
- Chat
- Kuruzhdey
- Khodzhakala
- Kënekesir
- Shemli
- Kazgan
- Arab-Kala
- Hawdan
- Kaka
- Dushak
- Miana
- Imeni Kuliyev
- Akhchadepe
- Karaman Vtoroy
- Kichiga Vtoraya
- Serakhs
- Polekhatum

== See also ==
- Treaty of Akhal
- Iran–Turkmenistan relations
