= Mazar-e Shaheda =

Mazar-e Shaheda مزارشهدا
- Village
- Country: Iran
- Province: Kerman
- County: Anbarabad
- Bakhsh: Central
- Rural District: Mohammadabad

Population (2006)
  - Total: 83
- Time zone: UTC+3:30 (IRST)
  - Summer (DST): UTC+4:30 (IRDT)

Mazar-e Shaheda (Persian: مزارشهدا, also Romanized as Mazār-e Shahedā) is a village in Mohammadabad Rural District, in the Central District of Anbarabad County, Kerman Province, Iran. At the 2006 census, its population was 83, in 17 families.
