= Darbidan =

Darbidan (Persian: دربيدان) may refer to:

- Darbidan, Anbarabad
- Darbidan, Maskun, Jiroft County
- Darbidan, Rezvan, Jiroft County
