= Bamchenar =

Bamchenar بام چنار
- Village
- Location within Iran
- Coordinates: 36°26′45″N 60°12′56″E
- Country: Iran
- Province: Razavi Khorasan
- County: Kalat
- Bakhsh: Zavin
- Rural District: Pasakuh

Population (2006)
  - Total: 56
- Time zone: UTC+3:30 (IRST)
  - Summer (DST): UTC+4:30 (IRDT)

Bamchenar (Persian: بام چنار, also Romanized as Bāmchenār; also known as Bachinar and Bāmchār) is a village in Pasakuh Rural District, Zavin District, Kalat County, Razavi Khorasan Province, Iran. At the 2006 census, its population was 56, in 14 families.

== See also ==
- List of cities, towns and villages in Razavi Khorasan Province
