= Rustai-ye Shahid Deh Qan Pur =

Rustai-ye Shahid Deh Qan Pur روستاي شهيد دهقان پور
- Village
- Interactive map of Rustai-ye Shahid Deh Qan Pur
- Country: Iran
- Province: Kerman
- County: Anbarabad
- Bakhsh: Central
- Rural District: Jahadabad

Population (2006)
  - Total: 575
- Time zone: UTC+3:30 (IRST)
  - Summer (DST): UTC+4:30 (IRDT)

Rustai-ye Shahid Deh Qan Pur (Persian: روستاي شهيد دهقان پور, also romanized as Rūstāī-ye Shahīd Deh Qān Pūr) is a village in Jahadabad Rural District, in the Central District of Anbarabad County, Kerman Province, Iran. At the 2006 census, its population was 575, in 118 families.
