= Palkanlu =

Palkanlu (Persian: پالكانلو) may refer to:

- Palkanlu-ye Bala, North Khorasan Province
- Palkanlu-ye Pain, North Khorasan Province
- Palkanlu-ye Olya, Razavi Khorasan Province
- Palkanlu-ye Sofla, Razavi Khorasan Province
