= Mahtutabad =

Mahtutabad محطوط اباد
- Village
- Location within Iran
- Coordinates: 28°27′10″N 57°47′41″E
- Country: Iran
- Province: Kerman
- County: Anbarabad
- Bakhsh: Central
- Rural District: Mohammadabad

Population (2006)
  - Total: 540
- Time zone: UTC+3:30 (IRST)
  - Summer (DST): UTC+4:30 (IRDT)

Mahtutabad (Persian: محطوط اباد, also Romanized as Maḩţūţābād; also known as Maţūţābād) is a village in Mohammadabad Rural District, in the Central District of Anbarabad County, Kerman Province, Iran. At the 2006 census, its population was 540, in 97 families.
