= Ab Mis =

Ab Mis اب ميس
- Village
- Location within Iran
- Coordinates: 28°40′47″N 58°17′51″E
- Country: Iran
- Province: Kerman
- County: Anbarabad
- Bakhsh: Central
- Rural District: Amjaz

Population (2006)
  - Total: 47
- Time zone: UTC+3:30 (IRST)
  - Summer (DST): UTC+4:30 (IRDT)

Ab Mis (Persian: اب ميس, also Romanized as Āb Mīs; also known as Āb Madīk and Āb Mīsk) is a village in Amjaz Rural District, in the Central District of Anbarabad County, Kerman province, Iran. At the 2006 census, its population was 47, in 13 families.
