= Tuzanlu =

Tuzanlu توزانلو
- Village
- Location within Iran
- Coordinates: 37°32′43″N 58°54′22″E
- Country: Iran
- Province: Razavi Khorasan
- County: Dargaz
- Bakhsh: Now Khandan
- Rural District: Shahrestaneh

Population (2006)
  - Total: 259
- Time zone: UTC+3:30 (IRST)
  - Summer (DST): UTC+4:30 (IRDT)

Tuzanlu (Persian: توزانلو, also Romanized as Tūzānlū) is a village in Shahrestaneh Rural District, Now Khandan District, Dargaz County, Razavi Khorasan Province, Iran. At the 2006 census, its population was 259, in 71 families.
