= Esfichar =

Esfichar اسفيچار
- Village
- Location within Iran
- Coordinates: 28°37′53″N 58°04′57″E
- Country: Iran
- Province: Kerman
- County: Anbarabad
- Bakhsh: Central
- Rural District: Amjaz

Population (2006)
  - Total: 52
- Time zone: UTC+3:30 (IRST)
  - Summer (DST): UTC+4:30 (IRDT)

Esfichar (Persian: اسفيچار, also Romanized as Esfīchār) is a village in Amjaz Rural District, in the Central District of Anbarabad County, Kerman Province, Iran. At the 2006 census, its population was 52, in 11 families.
