= Rudmadan =

Rudmadan رودمدان
- Village
- Location within Iran
- Coordinates: 28°36′46″N 58°03′19″E
- Country: Iran
- Province: Kerman
- County: Anbarabad
- Bakhsh: Central
- Rural District: Amjaz

Population (2006)
  - Total: 139
- Time zone: UTC+3:30 (IRST)
  - Summer (DST): UTC+4:30 (IRDT)

Rudmadan (Persian: رودمدان, also Romanized as Rūdmadān) is a village in Amjaz Rural District, in the Central District of Anbarabad County, Kerman Province, Iran. At the 2006 census, its population was 139, in 30 families.
