= Sheykhanlu =

Sheykhvanlu (Persian: شيخوانلو) may refer to:

- Sheykhanlu-ye Olya
- Sheykhanlu-ye Sofla
