= Ab Kameh =

Village in Razavi Khorasan, Iran

Ab Kameh ابكمه
- Village
- Location within Iran
- Coordinates: 36°52′52″N 59°41′28″E
- Country: Iran
- Province: Razavi Khorasan
- County: Kalat
- Bakhsh: Zavin
- Rural District: Zavin

Population (2006)
  - Total: 256
- Time zone: UTC+3:30 (IRST)
  - Summer (DST): UTC+4:30 (IRDT)

Ab Kameh (Persian: ابكمه, also Romanized as Āb Kameh) is a village in Zavin Rural District, Zavin District, Kalat County, Razavi Khorasan Province, Iran. At the 2006 census, its population was 256, in 61 families.

== See also ==
- List of cities, towns and villages in Razavi Khorasan Province
