= Lard Kharan =

Lard Kharan لردخران
- Village
- Location within Iran
- Coordinates: 28°27′01″N 57°51′46″E
- Country: Iran
- Province: Kerman
- County: Anbarabad
- Bakhsh: Central
- Rural District: Mohammadabad

Population (2006)
  - Total: 51
- Time zone: UTC+3:30 (IRST)
  - Summer (DST): UTC+4:30 (IRDT)

Lard Kharan (Persian: لردخران, also Romanized as Lard Kharān) is a village in Mohammadabad Rural District, in the Central District of Anbarabad County, Kerman Province, Iran. At the 2006 census, its population was 51, in 11 families.
