= Alang-e Sofla =

Alang-e Sofla النگ سفلي
- Village
- Location within Iran
- Coordinates: 36°30′23″N 60°15′38″E
- Country: Iran
- Province: Razavi Khorasan
- County: Kalat
- Bakhsh: Zavin
- Rural District: Pasakuh

Population (2006)
  - Total: 40
- Time zone: UTC+3:30 (IRST)
  - Summer (DST): UTC+4:30 (IRDT)

Alang-e Sofla (Persian: النگ سفلي, also Romanized as Alang-e Soflá; also known as Alang-e ‘Alī Beyg), meaning "Lower Alang", is a village in Pasakuh Rural District, Zavin District, Kalat County, Razavi Khorasan Province, Iran. At the 2006 census, its population was 40, in 10 families.
