= Seh Panjeh =

Seh Panjeh سه پنجه
- Village
- Location within Iran
- Coordinates: 36°33′02″N 60°18′46″E
- Country: Iran
- Province: Razavi Khorasan
- County: Kalat
- Bakhsh: Zavin
- Rural District: Pasakuh

Population (2006)
  - Total: 33
- Time zone: UTC+3:30 (IRST)
  - Summer (DST): UTC+4:30 (IRDT)

Seh Panjeh (Persian: سه پنجه; also known as Sipanja) is a village in Pasakuh Rural District, Zavin District, Kalat County, Razavi Khorasan Province, Iran. At the 2006 census, its population was 33, in 10 families.
