= Bahar Kahur =

Bahar Kahur بهار كهور
- Village
- Location within Iran
- Coordinates: 28°21′00″N 57°53′00″E
- Country: Iran
- Province: Kerman
- County: Anbarabad
- Bakhsh: Central
- Rural District: Jahadabad

Population (2006)
  - Total: 59
- Time zone: UTC+3:30 (IRST)
  - Summer (DST): UTC+4:30 (IRDT)

Bahar Kahur (Persian: بهار كهور, also Romanizeed as Bahār Kahūr) is a village in Jahadabad Rural District, in the Central District of Anbarabad County, Kerman Province, Iran. At the 2006 census, its population was 59, in 14 families.
