= Shahrak-e Zeyndanlu =

Shahrak-e Zeyndanlu شهرك زيندانلو
- Village
- Location within Iran
- Coordinates: 37°36′36″N 58°47′24″E
- Country: Iran
- Province: Razavi Khorasan
- County: Dargaz
- Bakhsh: Now Khandan
- Rural District: Shahrestaneh

Population (2006)
  - Total: 234
- Time zone: UTC+3:30 (IRST)
  - Summer (DST): UTC+4:30 (IRDT)

Shahrak-e Zeyndanlu (Persian: شهرك زيندانلو, also Romanized as Shahraḵ-e Zeyndānlū) is a village in Shahrestaneh Rural District, Now Khandan District, Dargaz County, Razavi Khorasan Province, Iran. At the 2006 census, its population was 234, in 50 families.
