= Tarqetey =

Tarqetey طرقطي
- Village
- Location within Iran
- Coordinates: 36°46′27″N 60°02′41″E
- Country: Iran
- Province: Razavi Khorasan
- County: Kalat
- Bakhsh: Zavin
- Rural District: Zavin

Population (2006)
  - Total: 167
- Time zone: UTC+3:30 (IRST)
  - Summer (DST): UTC+4:30 (IRDT)

Tarqetey (Persian: طرقطي, also Romanized as Ţarqeţey; also known as Torgutain, Ţorqaţī, and Torqatīn) is a village in Zavin Rural District, Zavin District, Kalat County, Razavi Khorasan Province, Iran. At the 2006 census, its population was 167, in 28 families.
