= Rustai-ye Shahid Beheshti =

Rustai-ye Shahid Beheshti روستاي شهيد بهشتي
- Village
- Interactive map of Rustai-ye Shahid Beheshti
- Country: Iran
- Province: Kerman
- County: Anbarabad
- Bakhsh: Central
- Rural District: Jahadabad

Population (2006)
  - Total: 840
- Time zone: UTC+3:30 (IRST)
  - Summer (DST): UTC+4:30 (IRDT)

Rustai-ye Shahid Beheshti (Persian: روستاي شهيد بهشتي, also Romanized as Rūstāī-ye Shahīd Beheshtī) is a village in Jahadabad Rural District, in the Central District of Anbarabad County, Kerman Province, Iran. At the 2006 census, its population was 840, in 183 families.
