= Gurik =

Gurik گوريك
- Village
- Location within Iran
- Coordinates: 28°37′15″N 58°14′03″E
- Country: Iran
- Province: Kerman
- County: Anbarabad
- Bakhsh: Central
- Rural District: Amjaz

Population (2006)
  - Total: 19
- Time zone: UTC+3:30 (IRST)
  - Summer (DST): UTC+4:30 (IRDT)

Gurik (Persian: گوريك, also Romanized as Gūrīk; also known as Gowd Rīk) is a village in Amjaz Rural District, in the Central District of Anbarabad County, Kerman Province, Iran. At the 2006 census report, its population was 19, in 4 families.
