= Mahtari Ziyarat =

Mahtari Ziyarat مهتاري زيارت
- Village
- Interactive map of Mahtari Ziyarat
- Country: Iran
- Province: Kerman
- County: Anbarabad
- Bakhsh: Central
- Rural District: Jahadabad

Population (2006)
  - Total: 543
- Time zone: UTC+3:30 (IRST)
  - Summer (DST): UTC+4:30 (IRDT)

Mahtari Ziyarat (Persian: مهتاري زيارت, also Romanized as Mahtārī Zīyārat) is a village in Jahadabad Rural District, in the Central District of Anbarabad County, Kerman Province, Iran. At the 2006 census, its population was 543, in 124 families.
