= Zavin =

Zavin (Persian: زاوین) may refer to:

- Zavin District
- Zavin Rural District
