= Lard Midan =

Lard Midan لردميدان
- Village
- Interactive map of Lard Midan
- Country: Iran
- Province: Kerman
- County: Anbarabad
- Bakhsh: Central
- Rural District: Jahadabad

Population (2006)
  - Total: 183
- Time zone: UTC+3:30 (IRST)
  - Summer (DST): UTC+4:30 (IRDT)

Lard Midan (Persian: لردميدان, also Romanized as Lard Mīdān) is a village in Jahadabad Rural District, in the Central District of Anbarabad County, Kerman Province, Iran. At the 2006 census, its population was 183, in 34 families.
