= Sang-e Malideh =

Sang-e Malideh سنگ مليده
- Village
- Country: Iran
- Province: Kerman
- County: Anbarabad
- Bakhsh: Central
- Rural District: Amjaz

Population (2006)
  - Total: 121
- Time zone: UTC+3:30 (IRST)
  - Summer (DST): UTC+4:30 (IRDT)

Sang-e Malideh (Persian: سنگ مليده, also Romanized as Sang-e Malīdeh) is a village in Amjaz Rural District, in the Central District of Anbarabad County, Kerman Province, Iran. At the 2006 census, its population was 121, in 23 families.
