= Zeyndanlu =

Zeyndanlu or Zeynadanlu or Zindanlu (Persian: زيندانلو) or Zeydanlu may refer to:

- Borj-e Zeydanlu
- Zeydanlu
- Zeyndanlu-ye Olya
- Zeyndanlu-ye Sofla
