= Khvajeh Rowshanai =

Khvajeh Rowshanai خواجه روشنايي
- Village
- Location within Iran
- Coordinates: 36°28′56″N 60°10′48″E
- Country: Iran
- Province: Razavi Khorasan
- County: Kalat
- Bakhsh: Zavin
- Rural District: Pasakuh

Population (2006)
  - Total: 11
- Time zone: UTC+3:30 (IRST)
  - Summer (DST): UTC+4:30 (IRDT)

Khvajeh Rowshanai (Persian: خواجه روشنايي, also Romanized as Khvājeh Rowshanā’ī; also known as Khājeh Rowshanā’ī, Khvājeh Roshnai, and Khwāja Roshnai) is a village in Pasakuh Rural District, Zavin District, Kalat County, Razavi Khorasan Province, Iran. At the 2006 census, its population was 11, in 4 families.
