= Showkatabad, Kerman =

Showkatabad شوكت آباد
- Village
- Location within Iran
- Coordinates: 28°22′27″N 57°48′39″E
- Country: Iran
- Province: Kerman
- County: Anbarabad
- Bakhsh: Central
- Rural District: Aliabad

Population (2006)
  - Total: 341
- Time zone: UTC+3:30 (IRST)
  - Summer (DST): UTC+4:30 (IRDT)

Showkatabad (Persian: شوكت آباد, also romanized as Showḵatābād; also known as Shokat Abad) is a village in Aliabad Rural District, in the Central District of Anbarabad County, Kerman Province, Iran. At the 2006 census, its population was 341, in 68 families.
