= Rustai-ye Deh Reza =

Rustai-ye Deh Reza روستاي ده رضا
- Village
- Interactive map of Rustai-ye Deh Reza
- Country: Iran
- Province: Kerman
- County: Anbarabad
- Bakhsh: Central
- Rural District: Aliabad

Population (2006)
  - Total: 709
- Time zone: UTC+3:30 (IRST)
  - Summer (DST): UTC+4:30 (IRDT)

Rustai-ye Deh Reza (Persian: روستاي ده رضا, also Romanized as Rūstāī-ye Deh Rez̤ā) is a village in Aliabad Rural District, in the Central District of Anbarabad County, Kerman Province, Iran. According to the 2006 census, its population was 709, with 157 families.
