= Pay-ye Tal =

Pay-ye Tal پاي تل
- Village
- Location within Iran
- Coordinates: 28°49′00″N 58°14′00″E
- Country: Iran
- Province: Kerman
- County: Anbarabad
- Bakhsh: Central
- Rural District: Amjaz

Population (2006)
  - Total: 14
- Time zone: UTC+3:30 (IRST)
  - Summer (DST): UTC+4:30 (IRDT)

Pay-ye Tal (Persian: پاي تل, also Romanized as Pāy-ye Tal; also known as Pā-ye Tal) is a village in Amjaz Rural District, in the Central District of Anbarabad County, Kerman Province, Iran. At the 2006 census, its population was 14, in 4 families.
