= Qelichabad =

Qelichabad (Persian: قليچ اباد) may refer to:

- Qelichabad, Alborz
- Qelichabad, Dargaz, Razavi Khorasan Province
- Qelichabad, Kalat, Razavi Khorasan Province
