= Qanat Kalantar =

Qanat Kalantar قنات كلنتر
- Village
- Location within Iran
- Coordinates: 28°32′24″N 57°49′40″E
- Country: Iran
- Province: Kerman
- County: Anbarabad
- Bakhsh: Central
- Rural District: Mohammadabad

Population (2006)
  - Total: 312
- Time zone: UTC+3:30 (IRST)
  - Summer (DST): UTC+4:30 (IRDT)

Qanat Kalantar (Persian: قنات كلنتر, also Romanized as Qanāt Kalāntar and Qanāt-e Kalāntar) is a village in Mohammadabad Rural District, in the Central District of Anbarabad County, Kerman Province, Iran. At the 2006 census, its population was 312, in 70 families.
