= Alang-e Olya =

Alang-e Olya النگ عليا
- Village
- Location within Iran
- Coordinates: 36°30′02″N 60°17′14″E
- Country: Iran
- Province: Razavi Khorasan
- County: Kalat
- Bakhsh: Zavin
- Rural District: Pasakuh

Population (2006)
  - Total: 32
- Time zone: UTC+3:30 (IRST)
  - Summer (DST): UTC+4:30 (IRDT)

Alang-e Olya (Persian: النگ عليا, also Romanized as Alang-e ‘Olyā; also known as Alang-e Āqā Beyg) is a village in Pasakuh Rural District, Zavin District, Kalat County, Razavi Khorasan Province, Iran. At the 2006 census, its population was 32, in 11 families.

== See also ==
- List of cities, towns and villages in Razavi Khorasan Province
