= Asyab Qashqa =

Coordinates: 36.5850°N 60.0166°E

Asyab Qashqa اسياب قشقا
- Village
- Interactive map of Asyab Qashqa
- Country: Iran
- Province: Razavi Khorasan
- County: Kalat
- Bakhsh: Zavin
- Rural District: Pasakuh

Population (2006)
  - Total: 23
- Time zone: UTC+3:30 (IRST)
  - Summer (DST): UTC+4:30 (IRDT)

Asyab Qashqa (Persian: اسياب قشقا, also Romanized as Āsyāb Qashqā) is a village in Pasakuh Rural District, Zavin District, Kalat County, Razavi Khorasan Province, Iran. At the 2006 census, its population was 23, in 12 families.

== See also ==
- List of cities, towns and villages in Razavi Khorasan Province
