= Seyyedha =

Village in Razavi Khorasan province, Iran

Seyyedha Persian: سيدها
- Village
- Location within Iran
- Coordinates: 37°37′31″N 58°42′37″E
- Country: Iran
- Province: Razavi Khorasan
- County: Dargaz
- District: Now Khandan
- Rural District: Dorungar

Population (2016)
  - Total: 283
- Time zone: UTC+3:30 (IRST)

Seyyedha (Persian: سيدها) (Note: Also romanized as Seyyedhā) is a village in Dorungar Rural District of Now Khandan District in Dargaz County, Razavi Khorasan province, Iran.

== Demographics ==
=== Population ===
At the time of the 2006 National Census, the village's population was 247 in 62 households. The following census in 2011 counted 279 people in 101 households. The 2016 census measured the population of the village as 283 people in 93 households.
