= Qarah Tikan =

Village in Razavi Khorasan province, Iran

Qarah Tikan Persian: قره تيكان
- Village
- Location within Iran
- Coordinates: 36°49′00″N 60°11′33″E
- Country: Iran
- Province: Razavi Khorasan
- County: Kalat
- District: Zavin
- Rural District: Zavin

Population (2016)
  - Total: 246
- Time zone: UTC+3:30 (IRST)

Qarah Tikan (Persian: قره تيكان) (Note: Also romanized as Qarah Tīkān and Qareh Tīkān; also known as Qarātigān, Qareh Tekān, Qareh Tīgān, and Shahīd Eslām Tūḵalī (شهيد اسلام توكلي)) is a village in Zavin Rural District of Zavin District in Kalat County, Razavi Khorasan province, Iran.

== Demographics ==
=== Population ===
At the time of the 2006 National Census, the village's population was 282 in 85 households. The following census in 2011 counted 337 people in 108 households. The 2016 census measured the population of the village as 246 people in 75 households.
