= Avaz Mohammad =

Village in Razavi Khorasan province, Iran

Avaz Mohammad Persian: عوض محمد
- Village
- Location within Iran
- Coordinates: 37°41′01″N 58°34′59″E
- Country: Iran
- Province: Razavi Khorasan
- County: Dargaz
- District: Now Khandan
- Rural District: Dorungar

Population (2016)
  - Total: 83
- Time zone: UTC+3:30 (IRST)

Avaz Mohammad (Persian: عوض محمد) (Note: Also romanized as ʿAvaẕ Moḩammad; formerly known as Avaz Mohammad Beyk (عوض محمدبيك), also romanized as ʿAvaẕ Moḩammad Beyk; also known as ʿAvaẕ Moḩammad Beyg) is a village in Dorungar Rural District of Now Khandan District in Dargaz County, Razavi Khorasan province, Iran.

== Demographics ==
=== Population ===
At the time of the 2006 National Census, the village's population was 102 in 25 households. The following census in 2011 counted 81 people in 25 households. The 2016 census measured the population of the village as 83 people in 24 households.
