= Taqiabad, Kalat =

Village in Razavi Khorasan province, Iran

Taqiabad Persian: تقي اباد
- Village
- Location within Iran
- Coordinates: 36°35′52″N 60°10′18″E
- Country: Iran
- Province: Razavi Khorasan
- County: Kalat
- District: Zavin
- Rural District: Pasakuh

Population (2016)
  - Total: 358
- Time zone: UTC+3:30 (IRST)

Taqiabad (Persian: تقی‌آباد) (Note: Also romanized as Taqīābād; also known as Mamnū‘eh) is a village in Pasakuh Rural District of Zavin District in Kalat County, Razavi Khorasan province, Iran.

== Demographics ==
=== Population ===
At the time of the 2006 National Census, the village's population was 585 in 133 households. The following census in 2011 counted 458 people in 130 households. The 2016 census measured the population of the village as 358 people in 114 households.
