= Sheykhanlu-ye Sofla =

Sheykhvanlu-ye Sofla شيخوانلوسفلي
- Village
- Location within Iran
- Coordinates: 37°34′58″N 58°50′04″E
- Country: Iran
- Province: Razavi Khorasan
- County: Dargaz
- Bakhsh: Now Khandan
- Rural District: Shahrestaneh

Population (2006)
  - Total: 226
- Time zone: UTC+3:30 (IRST)
  - Summer (DST): UTC+4:30 (IRDT)

Sheykhvanlu-ye Sofla (Persian: شيخوانلوسفلي, also Romanized as Sheykhvānlū-ye Soflá; also known as Sheykhvānlū-ye Pa’īn) is a village in Shahrestaneh Rural District, Now Khandan District, Dargaz County, Razavi Khorasan Province, Iran. At the 2006 census, its population was 226, in 65 families.
