= Taherabad-e Torkha =

Taherabad-e Torkha طاهرابادتركها
- Village
- Location within Iran
- Coordinates: 36°36′32″N 60°02′15″E
- Country: Iran
- Province: Razavi Khorasan
- County: Kalat
- Bakhsh: Zavin
- Rural District: Pasakuh

Population (2006)
  - Total: 138
- Time zone: UTC+3:30 (IRST)
  - Summer (DST): UTC+4:30 (IRDT)

Taherabad-e Torkha (Persian: طاهرابادتركها, also Romanized as Ţāherābād-e Torkhā; also known as Ţāherābād-e Tork, Ţāherābād, and Tirva) is a village in Pasakuh Rural District, Zavin District, Kalat County, Razavi Khorasan Province, Iran. At the 2006 census, its population was 138, in 32 families.
