= Asiyab-e Alikhan =

Asiyab-e Alikhan اسياب عليخان
- Village
- Location within Iran
- Coordinates: 28°36′06″N 58°03′35″E
- Country: Iran
- Province: Kerman
- County: Anbarabad
- Bakhsh: Central
- Rural District: Amjaz

Population (2006)
  - Total: 117
- Time zone: UTC+3:30 (IRST)
  - Summer (DST): UTC+4:30 (IRDT)

Asiyab-e Alikhan (Persian: اسياب عليخان, also romanized as Āsīyāb-e ʿAlīkhān) is a village in Amjaz Rural District, in the Central District of Anbarabad County, Kerman Province, Iran. At the 2006 census, its population was 117, in 29 families.
