= Zeyndanlu-ye Olya =

Zeyndanlu-ye Olya زيندانلوعليا
- Village
- Location within Iran
- Coordinates: 37°36′02″N 58°48′37″E
- Country: Iran
- Province: Razavi Khorasan
- County: Dargaz
- Bakhsh: Now Khandan
- Rural District: Shahrestaneh

Population (2006)
  - Total: 168
- Time zone: UTC+3:30 (IRST)
  - Summer (DST): UTC+4:30 (IRDT)

Zeyndanlu-ye Olya (Persian: زيندانلوعليا, also Romanized as Zeyndānlū-ye ‘Olyā and Zeynadānlū-ye ‘Olyā; also known as Zeydānlū-ye Bālā and Zīnadānlū-ye Bālā) is a village in Shahrestaneh Rural District, Now Khandan District, Dargaz County, Razavi Khorasan Province, Iran. At the 2006 census, its population was 168, in 46 families.
