= Mamadanlu =

Village in Razavi Khorasan province, Iran

Mamadanlu Persian: مامدانلو
- Village
- Location within Iran
- Coordinates: 37°37′50″N 58°38′59″E
- Country: Iran
- Province: Razavi Khorasan
- County: Dargaz
- District: Now Khandan
- Rural District: Dorungar

Population (2016)
  - Total: 148
- Time zone: UTC+3:30 (IRST)

Mamadanlu (Persian: مامدانلو) (Note: Also romanized as Māmdānlū; formerly known as Bahādorkhān (بهادرخان)) is a village in Dorungar Rural District of Now Khandan District in Dargaz County, Razavi Khorasan province, Iran.

== Demographics ==
=== Population ===
At the time of the 2006 National Census, the village's population was 201 in 54 households. The following census in 2011 counted 161 people in 57 households. The 2016 census measured the population of the village as 148 people in 56 households.
