= Aliabad-e Qadiri =

Village in Kerman province, Iran

Aliabad-e Qadiri Persian: علي اباد قديري
- Village
- Location within Iran
- Coordinates: 28°26′55″N 57°51′46″E
- Country: Iran
- Province: Kerman
- County: Anbarabad
- District: Central
- Rural District: Aliabad

Population (2016)
  - Total: 2,041
- Time zone: UTC+3:30 (IRST)

Aliabad-e Qadiri (Persian: علي ابادقديري) (Note: Also romanized as ‘Alīābād-e Qadīrī; also known as ‘Alīābād) is a village in, and the capital of, Aliabad Rural District of the Central District of Anbarabad County, Kerman province, Iran.

== Demographics ==
=== Population ===
At the time of the 2006 National Census, the village's population was 1,635 in 361 households. The following census in 2011 counted 1,922 people in 464 households. The 2016 census measured the population of the village as 2,041 people in 546 households. It was the most populous village in its rural district.
