= Owrtakand =

Village in Razavi Khorasan province, Iran

Owrtakand Persian: اورتكند
- Village
- Location within Iran
- Coordinates: 36°47′53″N 59°49′38″E
- Country: Iran
- Province: Razavi Khorasan
- County: Kalat
- District: Zavin
- Rural District: Zavin

Population (2016)
  - Total: 209
- Time zone: UTC+3:30 (IRST)

Owrtakand (Persian: اورتكند) (Note: Also romanized as Owrtākand and Ūrtākand; also known as Ortakand, Ortākand, and Owrtāgand) is a village in Zavin Rural District of Zavin District in Kalat County, Razavi Khorasan province, Iran.

== Demographics ==
=== Population ===
At the time of the 2006 National Census, the village's population was 173 in 49 households. The following census in 2011 counted 176 people in 55 households. The 2016 census measured the population of the village as 209 people in 58 households.
