= Mohammad Taqi, Razavi Khorasan =

Village in Razavi Khorasan province, Iran

Mohammad Taqi Persian: محمدتقي
- Village
- Location within Iran
- Coordinates: 37°37′08″N 58°38′20″E
- Country: Iran
- Province: Razavi Khorasan
- County: Dargaz
- District: Now Khandan
- Rural District: Dorungar

Population (2016)
  - Total: 435
- Time zone: UTC+3:30 (IRST)

Mohammad Taqi (Persian: محمدتقي) (Note: Also romanized as Moḩammad Taqī; also known as Dorūngar, Duringār, and Moḩammad Taqī Bag; formerly known as Mohammad Taqi Beyg (محمدتقي بيگ), also romanized as Moḩammad Taqī Beyg) is a village in Dorungar Rural District of Now Khandan District in Dargaz County, Razavi Khorasan province, Iran.

== Demographics ==
=== Population ===
At the time of the 2006 National Census, the village's population was 608 in 172 households. The following census in 2011 counted 556 people in 183 households. The 2016 census measured the population of the village as 435 people in 161 households. It was the most populous village in its rural district.
