= Sang-e Surakh =

Village in Razavi Khorasan province, Iran

Sang-e Surakh Persian: سنگ سوراخ
- Village
- Location within Iran
- Coordinates: 37°37′43″N 58°45′10″E
- Country: Iran
- Province: Razavi Khorasan
- County: Dargaz
- District: Now Khandan
- Rural District: Dorungar

Population (2016)
  - Total: 129
- Time zone: UTC+3:30 (IRST)

Sang-e Surakh (Persian: سنگ سوراخ) (Note: Also romanized as Sang Sūrākh, Sang-e Sūrākh, and Sang-i-Surākh; also known as Sang-e Sūrāk and Sang-e Sūrākhā) is a village in Dorungar Rural District of Now Khandan District in Dargaz County, Razavi Khorasan province, Iran.

== Demographics ==
=== Population ===
At the time of the 2006 National Census, the village's population was 182 in 53 households. The following census in 2011 counted 156 people in 49 households. The 2016 census measured the population of the village as 129 people in 43 households.
