= Bagh Kand =

Village in Razavi Khorasan province, Iran

Bagh Kand Persian: باغ كند
- Village
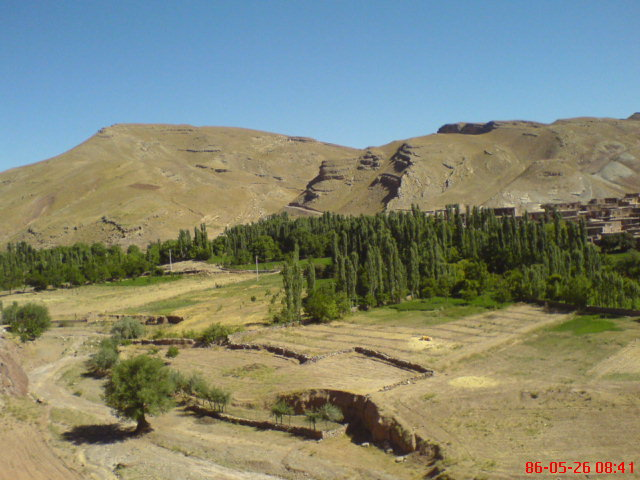

- Location within Iran
- Coordinates: 36°50′47″N 59°45′41″E
- Country: Iran
- Province: Razavi Khorasan
- County: Kalat
- District: Zavin
- Rural District: Zavin

Population (2016)
  - Total: 245
- Time zone: UTC+3:30 (IRST)

Bagh Kand (Persian: باغ كند) (Note: Also romanized as Bāgh Kand) is a village in Zavin Rural District of Zavin District in Kalat County, Razavi Khorasan province, Iran.

== Demographics ==
=== Population ===
At the time of the 2006 National Census, the village's population was 396 in 86 households. The following census in 2011 counted 342 people in 93 households. The 2016 census measured the population of the village as 245 people in 73 households.
