= Sheykhanlu-ye Olya =

Sheykhvanlu-ye Olya شيخوانلوعليا
- Village
- Location within Iran
- Coordinates: 37°35′14″N 58°49′53″E
- Country: Iran
- Province: Razavi Khorasan
- County: Dargaz
- Bakhsh: Now Khandan
- Rural District: Shahrestaneh

Population (2006)
  - Total: 21
- Time zone: UTC+3:30 (IRST)
  - Summer (DST): UTC+4:30 (IRDT)

Sheykhvanlu-ye Olya (Persian: شيخوانلوعليا, also Romanized as Sheykhvānlū-ye ‘Olyā; also known as Sheykhvānlū-ye Bālā) is a village in Shahrestaneh Rural District, Now Khandan District, Dargaz County, Razavi Khorasan Province, Iran. At the 2006 census, its population was 21, in 7 families.
