= Poshteh Shahan =

Poshteh Shahan پشته شاهان
- Village
- Location within Iran
- Coordinates: 28°35′43″N 58°03′18″E
- Country: Iran
- Province: Kerman
- County: Anbarabad
- Bakhsh: Central
- Rural District: Amjaz

Population (2006)
  - Total: 50
- Time zone: UTC+3:30 (IRST)
  - Summer (DST): UTC+4:30 (IRDT)

Poshteh Shahan (Persian: پشته شاهان, also Romanized as Poshteh Shāhān; also known as Poshteh Shāhī) is a village in Amjaz Rural District, in the Central District of Anbarabad County, Kerman Province, Iran. At the 2006 census, its population was 50, in 10 families.
