= Jolfan =

Village in Razavi Khorasan province, Iran

Jolfan Persian: جلفان
- Village
- Location within Iran
- Coordinates: 37°33′22″N 58°55′40″E
- Country: Iran
- Province: Razavi Khorasan
- County: Dargaz
- District: Now Khandan
- Rural District: Shahrestaneh

Population (2016)
  - Total: 445
- Time zone: UTC+3:30 (IRST)

Jolfan (Persian: جلفان) (Note: Also romanized as Jolfān) is a village in Shahrestaneh Rural District of Now Khandan District in Dargaz County, Razavi Khorasan province, Iran.

== Demographics ==
=== Population ===
At the time of the 2006 National Census, the village's population was 300 in 76 households. The following census in 2011 counted 496 people in 120 households. The 2016 census measured the population of the village as 445 people in 123 households.
