= Asiyab-e Mir Naser =

Asiyab-e Mir Naser اسياب ميرناصر
- Village
- Location within Iran
- Coordinates: 28°36′08″N 58°03′46″E
- Country: Iran
- Province: Kerman
- County: Anbarabad
- Bakhsh: Central
- Rural District: Amjaz

Population (2006)
  - Total: 9
- Time zone: UTC+3:30 (IRST)
  - Summer (DST): UTC+4:30 (IRDT)

Asiyab-e Mir Naser (Persian: اسياب ميرناصر, also romanized as Āsīyāb-e Mīr Nāṣer; also known as Āsīyāb-e Nāṣer) is a village in Amjaz Rural District, in the Central District of Anbarabad County, Kerman Province, Iran. At the 2006 census, its population was 9, in 4 families.
