= Dowlat Shanlu =

Village in Razavi Khorasan province, Iran

Dowlat Shanlu Persian: دولت شانلو
- Village
- Location within Iran
- Coordinates: 37°30′50″N 58°50′14″E
- Country: Iran
- Province: Razavi Khorasan
- County: Dargaz
- District: Now Khandan
- Rural District: Shahrestaneh

Population (2016)
  - Total: 309
- Time zone: UTC+3:30 (IRST)

Dowlat Shanlu (Persian: دولت شانلو) (Note: Also romanized as Dowlat Shānlū; also known as Dowlat Shāmlū) is a village in Shahrestaneh Rural District of Now Khandan District in Dargaz County, Razavi Khorasan province, Iran.

== Demographics ==
=== Population ===
At the time of the 2006 National Census, the village's population was 363 in 94 households. The following census in 2011 counted 317 people in 86 households. The 2016 census measured the population of the village as 309 people in 94 households.
