= Khezrabad, Kerman =

Village in Kerman province, Iran

Khezrabad Persian: خضراباد
- Village
- Location within Iran
- Coordinates: 28°30′21″N 57°50′30″E
- Country: Iran
- Province: Kerman
- County: Anbarabad
- District: Central
- Rural District: Mohammadabad

Population (2016)
  - Total: 1,442
- Time zone: UTC+3:30 (IRST)

Khezrabad (Persian: خضراباد) (Note: Also romanized as Kheẕrābād) is a village in, and the capital of, Mohammadabad Rural District of the Central District of Anbarabad County, Kerman province, Iran.

== Demographics ==
=== Population ===
At the time of the 2006 National Census, the village's population was 1,455 in 356 households. The following census in 2011 counted 1,924 people in 508 households. The 2016 census measured the population of the village as 1,442 people in 404 households. It was the most populous village in its rural district.
