= Robat, Zavin =

Robat رباط
- Village
- Location within Iran
- Coordinates: 36°38′46″N 60°05′03″E
- Country: Iran
- Province: Razavi Khorasan
- County: Kalat
- Bakhsh: Zavin
- Rural District: Pasakuh

Population (2006)
  - Total: 25
- Time zone: UTC+3:30 (IRST)
  - Summer (DST): UTC+4:30 (IRDT)

Robat (Persian: رباط, also Romanized as Robāţ; also known as Robāţ-e Pasākūh) is a village in Pasakuh Rural District, Zavin District, Kalat County, Razavi Khorasan Province, Iran. At the 2006 census, its population was 25, in 5 families.
