= Qaruchan =

Village in Razavi Khorasan province, Iran

Qaruchan Persian: قروچان
- Village
- Location within Iran
- Coordinates: 37°38′10″N 58°39′29″E
- Country: Iran
- Province: Razavi Khorasan
- County: Dargaz
- District: Now Khandan
- Rural District: Dorungar

Population (2016)
  - Total: 132
- Time zone: UTC+3:30 (IRST)

Qaruchan (Persian: قروچان) (Note: Also romanized as Qarūchān; formerly known as Ḩasan Kadkhodā (حسن كدخدا)) is a village in Dorungar Rural District of Now Khandan District in Dargaz County, Razavi Khorasan province, Iran.

== Demographics ==
=== Population ===
At the time of the 2006 National Census, the village's population was 107 in 28 households. The following census in 2011 counted 118 people in 33 households. The 2016 census measured the population of the village as 132 people in 47 households.
