= Palkanlu-ye Sofla =

Palkanlu-ye Sofla پالكانلوسفلي
- Village
- Location within Iran
- Coordinates: 37°34′12″N 58°53′03″E
- Country: Iran
- Province: Razavi Khorasan
- County: Dargaz
- Bakhsh: Now Khandan
- Rural District: Shahrestaneh

Population (2006)
  - Total: 250
- Time zone: UTC+3:30 (IRST)
  - Summer (DST): UTC+4:30 (IRDT)

Palkanlu-ye Sofla (Persian: پالكانلوسفلي, also Romanized as Pālkānlū-ye Soflá; also known as Pālkānlū-ye Pa’īn) is a village in Shahrestaneh Rural District, Now Khandan District, Dargaz County, Razavi Khorasan Province, Iran. At the 2006 census, its population was 250, in 58 families.
