= Arbab, Iran =

Village in Razavi Khorasan province, Iran

Arbab Persian: ارباب
- Village
- Location within Iran
- Coordinates: 37°41′28″N 58°34′52″E
- Country: Iran
- Province: Razavi Khorasan
- County: Dargaz
- District: Now Khandan
- Rural District: Dorungar

Population (2016)
  - Total: 98
- Time zone: UTC+3:30 (IRST)

Arbab (Persian: ارباب) (Note: Also romanized as Arbāb) is a village in Dorungar Rural District of Now Khandan District in Dargaz County, Razavi Khorasan province, Iran.

== Demographics ==
=== Population ===
At the time of the 2006 National Census, the village's population was 126 in 33 households. The following census in 2011 counted 122 people in 33 households. The 2016 census measured the population of the village as 98 people in 26 households.
