= Fazlabad, Dargaz =

Fazlabad فضل اباد
- Village
- Location within Iran
- Coordinates: 37°28′52″N 58°58′33″E
- Country: Iran
- Province: Razavi Khorasan
- County: Dargaz
- Bakhsh: Now Khandan
- Rural District: Shahrestaneh

Population (2006)
  - Total: 84
- Time zone: UTC+3:30 (IRST)
  - Summer (DST): UTC+4:30 (IRDT)

Fazlabad (Persian: فضل اباد, also Romanized as Faẕlābād) is a village in Shahrestaneh Rural District, Now Khandan District, Dargaz County, Razavi Khorasan Province, Iran. At the 2006 census, its population was 84, in 31 families.
