= Rahmanqoli =

Village in Razavi Khorasan province, Iran

Rahmanqoli Persian: رحمان قلي
- Village
- Location within Iran
- Coordinates: 37°37′35″N 58°38′42″E
- Country: Iran
- Province: Razavi Khorasan
- County: Dargaz
- District: Now Khandan
- Rural District: Dorungar

Population (2016)
  - Total: 102
- Time zone: UTC+3:30 (IRST)

Rahmanqoli (Persian: رحمان قلي) (Note: Also romanized as Raḩmānqolī; formerly known as Raḩmānqolī Beyk (رحمان قلي بيك)) is a village in Dorungar Rural District of Now Khandan District in Dargaz County, Razavi Khorasan province, Iran.

== Demographics ==
=== Population ===
At the time of the 2006 National Census, the village's population was 143 in 34 households. The following census in 2011 counted 122 people in 37 households. The 2016 census measured the population of the village as 102 people in 34 households.
