= Rustai-ye Shahid Salari =

Village in Kerman province, Iran

Rustai-ye Shahid Salari Persian: روستاي شهيد سالاري
- Village
- Location within Iran
- Coordinates: 28°20′20″N 57°54′47″E
- Country: Iran
- Province: Kerman
- County: Anbarabad
- District: Central
- Rural District: Jahadabad

Population (2016)
  - Total: 2,097
- Time zone: UTC+3:30 (IRST)

Rustai-ye Shahid Salari (Persian: روستاي شهيد سالاري) (Note: Also romanized as Rūstāī-ye Shahīd Sālārī) is a village in Jahadabad Rural District of the Central District of Anbarabad County, Kerman province, Iran.

== Demographics ==
=== Population ===
At the time of the 2006 National Census, the village's population was 1,624 in 363 households. The following census in 2011 counted 2,373 people in 590 households. The 2016 census measured the population of the village as 2,097 people in 582 households. It was the most populous village in its rural district.
