= Pagodar, Anbarabad =

Pagodar پاگدار
- Village
- Location within Iran
- Coordinates: 28°58′44″N 57°53′43″E
- Country: Iran
- Province: Kerman
- County: Anbarabad
- Bakhsh: Central
- Rural District: Amjaz

Population (2006)
  - Total: 25
- Time zone: UTC+3:30 (IRST)
  - Summer (DST): UTC+4:30 (IRDT)

Pagodar (Persian: پاگدار, also Romanized as Pāgodār and Pā-ye Godār; also known as Pāgodār-e Maskūn) is a village in Amjaz Rural District, in the Central District of Anbarabad County, Kerman Province, Iran. At the 2006 census, its population was 25, in 4 families.
