= Poshteh-ye Barjan =

Village in Kerman, Iran

Poshteh-ye Barjan پشته بارجان
- Village
- Location within Iran
- Coordinates: 28°46′52″N 58°08′55″E
- Country: Iran
- Province: Kerman
- County: Anbarabad
- Bakhsh: Central
- Rural District: Amjaz

Population (2006)
  - Total: 36
- Time zone: UTC+3:30 (IRST)
  - Summer (DST): UTC+4:30 (IRDT)

Poshteh-ye Barjan (Persian: پشته بارجان, also Romanized as Poshteh-ye Bārjān; also known as Posht-e Mārjān) is a village in Amjaz Rural District, in the Central District of Anbarabad County, Kerman Province, Iran. At the 2006 census, its population was 36, in 7 families.
