= Chenar, Dargaz =

Village in Razavi Khorasan province, Iran

Chenar Persian: چنار
- Village
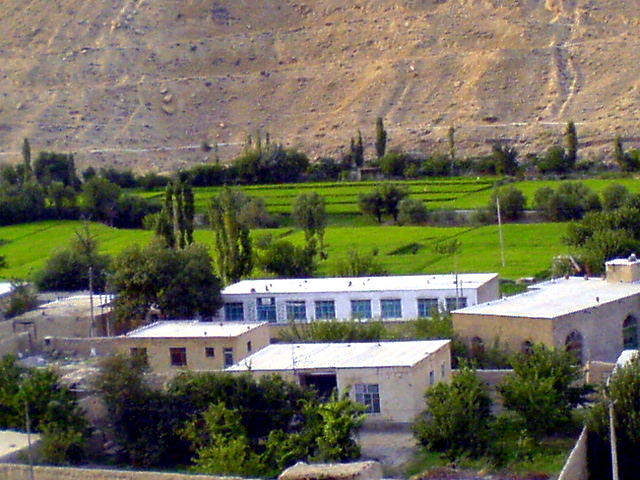
- The village of Chenar

- Location within Iran
- Coordinates: 37°38′03″N 58°40′55″E
- Country: Iran
- Province: Razavi Khorasan
- County: Dargaz
- District: Now Khandan
- Rural District: Dorungar

Population (2016)
  - Total: 302
- Time zone: UTC+3:30 (IRST)

Chenar (Persian: چنار) (Note: Also romanized as Chenār) is a village in Dorungar Rural District of Now Khandan District in Dargaz County, Razavi Khorasan province, Iran.

== Demographics ==
=== Population ===
At the time of the 2006 National Census, the village's population was 293 in 90 households. The following census in 2011 counted 287 people in 99 households. The 2016 census measured the population of the village as 302 people in 103 households.
