= Tagan, Iran =

Village in Razavi Khorasan province, Iran

Tagan Persian: تگن
- Village
- Location within Iran
- Coordinates: 37°37′35″N 58°43′44″E
- Country: Iran
- Province: Razavi Khorasan
- County: Dargaz
- District: Now Khandan
- Rural District: Dorungar

Population (2016)
  - Total: 168
- Time zone: UTC+3:30 (IRST)

Tagan (Persian: تگن) is a village in Dorungar Rural District of Now Khandan District in Dargaz County, Razavi Khorasan province, Iran.

== Demographics ==
=== Population ===
At the time of the 2006 National Census, the village's population was 146 in 42 households. The following census in 2011 counted 175 people in 63 households. The 2016 census measured the population of the village as 168 people in 57 households.
