= Amirabad, Kalat =

Village in Razavi Khorasan province, Iran

Amirabad Persian: اميراباد
- Village
- Location within Iran
- Coordinates: 36°34′22″N 60°08′02″E
- Country: Iran
- Province: Razavi Khorasan
- County: Kalat
- District: Zavin
- Rural District: Pasakuh

Population (2016)
  - Total: 242
- Time zone: UTC+3:30 (IRST)

Amirabad (Persian: اميراباد) (Note: Also romanized as Amīrābād) is a village in, and the capital of, Pasakuh Rural District in Zavin District of Kalat County, Razavi Khorasan province, Iran.

== Demographics ==
=== Population ===
At the time of the 2006 National Census, the village's population was 291 in 67 households. The following census in 2011 counted 245 people in 69 households. The 2016 census measured the population of the village as 242 people in 74 households.
