= Sheykhha, Razavi Khorasan =

Village in Razavi Khorasan province, Iran

Sheykhha Persian: شيخ ها
- Village
- Location within Iran
- Coordinates: 37°37′27″N 58°43′08″E
- Country: Iran
- Province: Razavi Khorasan
- County: Dargaz
- District: Now Khandan
- Rural District: Dorungar

Population (2016)
  - Total: 123
- Time zone: UTC+3:30 (IRST)

Sheykhha (Persian: شيخ ها) (Note: Also romanized as Sheykhhā) is a village in, and the capital of, Dorungar Rural District in Now Khandan District of Dargaz County, Razavi Khorasan province, Iran.

== Demographics ==
=== Population ===
At the time of the 2006 National Census, the village's population was 170 in 48 households. The following census in 2011 counted 148 people in 53 households. The 2016 census measured the population of the village as 123 people in 44 households.
