= Gaduganlu =

Village in Razavi Khorasan province, Iran

Gaduganlu Persian: گدوگانلو
- Village
- Location within Iran
- Coordinates: 37°37′23″N 58°39′06″E
- Country: Iran
- Province: Razavi Khorasan
- County: Dargaz
- District: Now Khandan
- Rural District: Dorungar

Population (2016)
  - Total: 30
- Time zone: UTC+3:30 (IRST)

Gaduganlu (Persian: گدوگانلو) (Note: Also romanized as Gadūgānlū) is a village in Dorungar Rural District of Now Khandan District in Dargaz County, Razavi Khorasan province, Iran.

== Demographics ==
=== Population ===
At the time of the 2006 National Census, the village's population was 82 in 18 households. The following census in 2011 counted 73 people in 25 households. The 2016 census measured the population of the village as 30 people in 12 households.
