= Taherabad-e Barbaryeha =

Taherabad-e Barbaryeha طاهرابادبربريها
- Village
- Country: Iran
- Province: Razavi Khorasan
- County: Kalat
- Bakhsh: Zavin
- Rural District: Pasakuh

Population (2006)
  - Total: 42
- Time zone: UTC+3:30 (IRST)
  - Summer (DST): UTC+4:30 (IRDT)

Taherabad-e Barbaryeha (Persian: طاهرابادبربريها, also Romanized as Ţāherābād-e Barbaryehā; also known as Ţāherābād-e ‘Olyā) is a village in Pasakuh Rural District, Zavin District, Kalat County, Razavi Khorasan Province, Iran. At the 2006 census, its population was 42, in 11 families.
