= Jashnabad =

Village in Razavi Khorasan province, Iran

Jashnabad Persian: جشن اباد
- Village
- Location within Iran
- Coordinates: 37°29′07″N 58°54′11″E
- Country: Iran
- Province: Razavi Khorasan
- County: Dargaz
- District: Now Khandan
- Rural District: Shahrestaneh

Population (2016)
  - Total: 698
- Time zone: UTC+3:30 (IRST)

Jashnabad (Persian: جشن اباد) (Note: Also romanized as Jashnābād; also known as Shahīdābād (شهيداباد)) is a village in Shahrestaneh Rural District of Now Khandan District in Dargaz County, Razavi Khorasan province, Iran.

== Demographics ==
=== Population ===
At the time of the 2006 National Census, the village's population was 922 in 229 households. The following census in 2011 counted 754 people in 246 households. The 2016 census measured the population of the village as 698 people in 237 households, the most populous in its rural district.
