= Poshteh Karun =

Poshteh Karun پشته كارون
- Village
- Location within Iran
- Coordinates: 28°36′04″N 58°03′31″E
- Country: Iran
- Province: Kerman
- County: Anbarabad
- Bakhsh: Central
- Rural District: Amjaz

Population (2006)
  - Total: 57
- Time zone: UTC+3:30 (IRST)
  - Summer (DST): UTC+4:30 (IRDT)

Poshteh Karun (Persian: پشته كارون, also Romanized as Poshteh Kārūn) is a village in Amjaz Rural District, in the Central District of Anbarabad County, Kerman Province, Iran. At the 2006 census, its population was 57, in 14 families.
