= Dahaneh-ye Gomrokan =

Village in Kerman province, Iran

Dahaneh-ye Gomrokan Persian: دهنه گمركان
- Village
- Location within Iran
- Coordinates: 28°34′27″N 58°02′27″E
- Country: Iran
- Province: Kerman
- County: Anbarabad
- District: Central
- Rural District: Amjaz

Population (2016)
  - Total: 254
- Time zone: UTC+3:30 (IRST)

Dahaneh-ye Gomrokan (Persian: دهنه گمركان) (Note: Also romanized as Dahaneh Gomrokān and Dahaneh-ye Gomrokān; also known as Dahaneh-ye Gomrūkān) is a village in, and the capital of, Amjaz Rural District of the Central District of Anbarabad County, Kerman province, Iran.

== Demographics ==
=== Population ===
At the time of the 2006 National Census, the village's population was 629 in 171 households. The following census in 2011 counted 262 people in 67 households. The 2016 census measured the population of the village as 254 people in 68 households.
