= Dust Mohammad, Razavi Khorasan =

Village in Razavi Khorasan province, Iran

Dust Mohammad Persian: دوست محمد
- Village
- Location within Iran
- Coordinates: 37°39′53″N 58°36′13″E
- Country: Iran
- Province: Razavi Khorasan
- County: Dargaz
- District: Now Khandan
- Rural District: Dorungar

Population (2016)
  - Total: 185
- Time zone: UTC+3:30 (IRST)

Dust Mohammad (Persian: دوست محمد) (Note: Also romanized as Dūst Moḩammad; formerly known as Dust Mohammad Beyk (دوست محمدبيك), also romanized as Dūst Moḩammad Beyk; also known as Dost Mohammad Beyk and Dūst Moḩammad Beyg) is a village in Dorungar Rural District of Now Khandan District in Dargaz County, Razavi Khorasan province, Iran.

== Demographics ==
=== Population ===
At the time of the 2006 National Census, the village's population was 244 in 74 households. The following census in 2011 counted 169 people in 59 households. The 2016 census measured the population of the village as 185 people in 66 households.
