= Aliabad Rural District =

Aliabad Rural District (Persian: دهستان علي آباد) may refer to several administrative divisions of Iran:

- Aliabad Rural District (Hashtrud County), East Azerbaijan province
- Aliabad Rural District (Khafr County), Fars province
- Aliabad Rural District (Anbarabad County), Kerman province
- Aliabad Rural District (Qaem Shahr County), Mazandaran province
- Aliabad Rural District (Taft County), Yazd province

== See also ==
- Aliabad-e Malek Rural District
