= Mowmenabad, Kalat =

Village in Razavi Khorasan province, Iran

Mowmenabad Persian: مومن اباد
- Village
- Location within Iran
- Coordinates: 36°27′30″N 60°17′08″E
- Country: Iran
- Province: Razavi Khorasan
- County: Kalat
- District: Zavin
- Rural District: Pasakuh

Population (2016)
  - Total: 160
- Time zone: UTC+3:30 (IRST)

Mowmenabad (Persian: مؤمن‌آباد) (Note: Also romanized as Mow’menābād; also known as Akbarābād and Mo’menābād) is a village in Pasakuh Rural District of Zavin District in Kalat County, Razavi Khorasan province, Iran.

== Demographics ==
=== Population ===
At the time of the 2006 National Census, the village's population was 156 in 37 households. The following census in 2011 counted 185 people in 55 households. The 2016 census measured the population of the village as 160 people in 42 households.
