= Pagodar-e Amjaz =

Pagodar-e Amjaz پاگدارامجز
- Village
- Location within Iran
- Coordinates: 28°38′17″N 58°09′35″E
- Country: Iran
- Province: Kerman
- County: Anbarabad
- Bakhsh: Central
- Rural District: Amjaz

Population (2006)
  - Total: 58
- Time zone: UTC+3:30 (IRST)
  - Summer (DST): UTC+4:30 (IRDT)

Pagodar-e Amjaz (Persian: پاگدارامجز, also Romanized as Pāgodār-e Amjaz and also known as Pāgdār, Pāgodār, Pagodar, and Pākdār) is a village in Amjaz Rural District, in the Central District of Anbarabad County, Kerman Province, Iran. According to the 2006 census, the village had a population of 58, distributed among 11 families.
