= Aman Magan =

Village in Razavi Khorasan province, Iran

Aman Magan Persian: امان مگان
- Village
- Location within Iran
- Coordinates: 37°40′24″N 58°35′01″E
- Country: Iran
- Province: Razavi Khorasan
- County: Dargaz
- District: Now Khandan
- Rural District: Dorungar

Population (2016)
  - Total: 54
- Time zone: UTC+3:30 (IRST)

Aman Magan (Persian: امان مگان) (Note: Also romanized as Āmān Magān; also known as Āmān Margān and Āmān Qal‘eh) is a village in Dorungar Rural District of Now Khandan District in Dargaz County, Razavi Khorasan province, Iran.

== Demographics ==
=== Population ===
At the time of the 2006 National Census, the village's population was 98 in 24 households. The following census in 2011 counted 53 people in 21 households. The 2016 census measured the population of the village as 54 people in 22 households.
