= Amjaz =

Village in Kerman province, Iran

Amjaz Persian: امجز
- Village
- Location within Iran
- Coordinates: 28°35′59″N 58°09′05″E
- Country: Iran
- Province: Kerman
- County: Anbarabad
- District: Central
- Rural District: Amjaz

Population (2016)
  - Total: 649
- Time zone: UTC+3:30 (IRST)

Amjaz (Persian: امجز) is a village in Amjaz Rural District of the Central District of Anbarabad County, Kerman province, Iran.

== Demographics ==
=== Population ===
At the time of the 2006 National Census, the village's population was 315 in 63 households. The following census in 2011 counted 846 people in 215 households. The 2016 census measured the population of the village as 649 people in 189 households. It was the most populous village in its rural district.
