= Sar Rud, Kalat =

Village in Razavi Khorasan province, Iran

Sar Rud Persian: سررود
- Village
- Location within Iran
- Coordinates: 36°47′25″N 59°52′01″E
- Country: Iran
- Province: Razavi Khorasan
- County: Kalat
- District: Zavin
- Rural District: Zavin

Population (2016)
  - Total: 719
- Time zone: UTC+3:30 (IRST)

Sar Rud (Persian: سررود) (Note: Also romanized as Sar Rūd) is a village in Zavin Rural District of Zavin District in Kalat County, Razavi Khorasan province, Iran.

== Demographics ==
=== Population ===
At the time of the 2006 National Census, the village's population was 849 in 207 households. The following census in 2011 counted 828 people in 243 households. The 2016 census measured the population of the village as 719 people in 218 households.
