= Borj-e Qaleh =

Village in Razavi Khorasan province, Iran

Borj-e Qaleh Persian: برج قلعه
- Village
- Location within Iran
- Coordinates: 37°32′32″N 58°56′22″E
- Country: Iran
- Province: Razavi Khorasan
- County: Dargaz
- District: Now Khandan
- Rural District: Shahrestaneh

Population (2016)
  - Total: 415
- Time zone: UTC+3:30 (IRST)

Borj-e Qaleh (Persian: برج قلعه) (Note: Also romanized as Borj Qal’eh and Borj-e Qal’eh; also known as Borjī Qal‘eh) is a village in, and the capital of, Shahrestaneh Rural District in Now Khandan District of Dargaz County, Razavi Khorasan province, Iran.

== Demographics ==
=== Population ===
At the time of the 2006 National Census, the village's population was 393 in 93 households. The following census in 2011 counted 415 people in 129 households. The 2016 census measured the population of the village as 415 people in 138 households.
