= Qaleh Now, Kalat =

Village in Razavi Khorasan province, Iran

Qaleh Now Persian: قلعه نو
- Village
- Location within Iran
- Coordinates: 36°47′50″N 59°57′02″E
- Country: Iran
- Province: Razavi Khorasan
- County: Kalat
- District: Zavin
- Rural District: Zavin

Population (2016)
  - Total: 934
- Time zone: UTC+3:30 (IRST)

Qaleh Now (Persian: قلعه نو) (Note: Also romanized as Qal`eh Now; also known as Yengī Qal‘eh) is a village in Zavin Rural District of Zavin District in Kalat County, Razavi Khorasan province, Iran.

== Demographics ==
=== Population ===
At the time of the 2006 National Census, the village's population was 1,168 in 312 households. The following census in 2011 counted 1,088 people in 331 households. The 2016 census measured the population of the village as 934 people in 310 households.
