= Abgarm, Razavi Khorasan =

Village in Razavi Khorasan province, Iran

Abgarm Persian: اب گرم
- Village
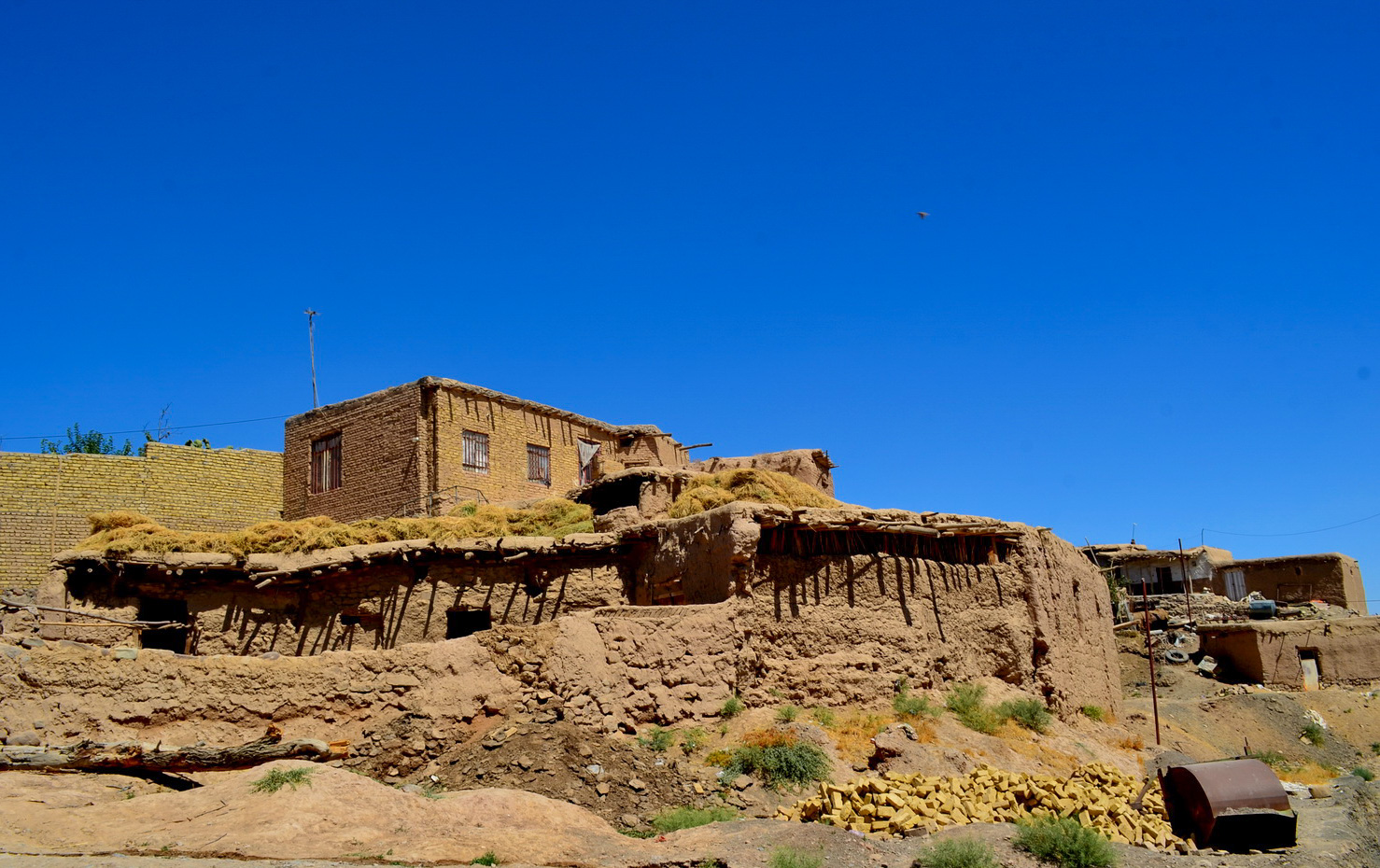
- The village of Abgarm

- Location within Iran
- Coordinates: 36°32′15″N 60°05′33″E
- Country: Iran
- Province: Razavi Khorasan
- County: Kalat
- District: Zavin
- Rural District: Pasakuh

Population (2016)
  - Total: 792
- Time zone: UTC+3:30 (IRST)

Abgarm (Persian: اب گرم) (Note: Also romanized as Ābgarm; also known as Ribāt-i-Shāh ‘Abbāsi and Robāţ-e Shāh ‘Abbāsī) is a village in Pasakuh Rural District of Zavin District in Kalat County, Razavi Khorasan province, Iran.

== Demographics ==
=== Population ===
At the time of the 2006 National Census, the village's population was 827 in 192 households. The following census in 2011 counted 810 people in 225 households. The 2016 census measured the population of the village as 792 people in 219 households, the most populous in its rural district.
