= Baghgah =

Village in Razavi Khorasan province, Iran

Baghgah Persian: باغگاه
- Village
- Location within Iran
- Coordinates: 36°27′56″N 60°11′54″E
- Country: Iran
- Province: Razavi Khorasan
- County: Kalat
- District: Zavin
- Rural District: Pasakuh

Population (2016)
  - Total: 199
- Time zone: UTC+3:30 (IRST)

Baghgah (Persian: باغگاه) (Note: Also romanized as Bāghgāh; also known as Bagha) is a village in Pasakuh Rural District of Zavin District in Kalat County, Razavi Khorasan province, Iran.

== Demographics ==
=== Population ===
At the time of the 2006 National Census, the village's population was 174 in 38 households. The following census in 2011 counted 205 people in 51 households. The 2016 census measured the population of the village as 199 people in 50 households.
