= Khanlanlu =

Village in Razavi Khorasan province, Iran

Khanlanlu Persian: خنلانلو
- Village
- Location within Iran
- Coordinates: 37°31′52″N 58°57′51″E
- Country: Iran
- Province: Razavi Khorasan
- County: Dargaz
- District: Now Khandan
- Rural District: Shahrestaneh

Population (2016)
  - Total: 268
- Time zone: UTC+3:30 (IRST)

Khanlanlu (Persian: خنلانلو) (Note: Also romanized as Khanlānlū; also known as Khalānlū) is a village in Shahrestaneh Rural District of Now Khandan District in Dargaz County, Razavi Khorasan province, Iran.

== Demographics ==
=== Population ===
At the time of the 2006 National Census, the village's population was 314 in 80 households. The following census in 2011 counted 283 people in 89 households. The 2016 census measured the population of the village as 268 people in 83 households.
