= Mohammad Vali =

Village in Razavi Khorasan province, Iran

Mohammad Vali Persian: محمدولي
- Village
- Location within Iran
- Coordinates: 37°41′15″N 58°35′11″E
- Country: Iran
- Province: Razavi Khorasan
- County: Dargaz
- District: Now Khandan
- Rural District: Dorungar

Population (2016)
  - Total: 149
- Time zone: UTC+3:30 (IRST)

Mohammad Vali (Persian: محمدولي,) (Note: Also romanized as Moḩammad Valī; formerly known as Mohammad Vali Beyk (محمدولي بيك), also romanized as Moḩammad Valī Beyk; also known as Moḩammad Valī Beyg) is a village in Dorungar Rural District of Now Khandan District in Dargaz County, Razavi Khorasan province, Iran.

== Demographics ==
=== Population ===
At the time of the 2006 National Census, the village's population was 129 in 33 households. The following census in 2011 counted 99 people in 37 households. The 2016 census measured the population of the village as 149 people in 50 households.
