= Jabbar, Razavi Khorasan =

Village in Razavi Khorasan province, Iran

Jabbar Persian: جبار
- Village
- Location within Iran
- Coordinates: 37°40′35″N 58°34′56″E
- Country: Iran
- Province: Razavi Khorasan
- County: Dargaz
- District: Now Khandan
- Rural District: Dorungar

Population (2016)
  - Total: 136
- Time zone: UTC+3:30 (IRST)

Jabbar (Persian: جبار) (Note: Also romanized as Jabār and Jabbār) is a village in Dorungar Rural District of Now Khandan District in Dargaz County, Razavi Khorasan province, Iran.

== Demographics ==
=== Population ===
At the time of the 2006 National Census, the village's population was 165 in 39 households. The following census in 2011 counted 139 people in 37 households. The 2016 census measured the population of the village as 136 people in 39 households.
