= Taherabad-e Torkha Jadid =

Village in Razavi Khorasan province, Iran

Taherabad-e Torkha Jadid Persian: طاهرابادتركها جديد
- Village
- Location within Iran
- Coordinates: 36°37′21″N 60°03′45″E
- Country: Iran
- Province: Razavi Khorasan
- County: Kalat
- District: Zavin
- Rural District: Pasakuh

Population (2016)
  - Total: 194
- Time zone: UTC+3:30 (IRST)

Taherabad-e Torkha Jadid (Persian: طاهرابادتركها جديد) (Note: Also romanized as Ţāherābād-e Torkhā Jadīd) is a village in Pasakuh Rural District of Zavin District in Kalat County, Razavi Khorasan province, Iran.

== Demographics ==
=== Population ===
At the time of the 2006 National Census, the village's population was 184 in 45 households. The following census in 2011 counted 206 people in 57 households. The 2016 census measured the population of the village as 194 people in 56 households.
