= Anbarabad =

City in Kerman province, Iran

Anbarabad Persian: عنبرآباد
- City
- Location within Iran
- Coordinates: 28°28′46″N 57°50′29″E
- Country: Iran
- Province: Kerman
- County: Anbarabad
- District: Central

Population (2016)
  - Total: 18,185
- Time zone: UTC+3:30 (IRST)

Anbarabad (Persian: عنبرآباد) (Note: Also romanized as ‘Anbarābād; also known as Ambārābād) is a city in the Central District of Anbarabad County, Kerman province, Iran, serving as capital of both the county and the district. It is located to the southwest of Jiroft, off the Road 91. The local economy is based on agriculture, with extensive fields around the city.

== History ==
In 2003, parts of Jiroft County were separated from it in the establishment of Anbarabad County, which was divided into three districts.

== Demographics ==
=== Population ===
At the time of the 2006 National Census, the city's population was 18,590 in 3,997 households. The following census in 2011 counted 18,731 people in 4,532 households. The 2016 census measured the population of the city as 18,185 people in 5,285 households.

== Geography ==
Most of the land around Anbarabad is steppe or sandy desert, but there is an extensive strip of fields between the city and the Route 91, indicating an agricultural importance in the area. Some species have been identified which are endemic to the Anbarabad area including those of the subfamily Thaumastellinae of the genus Thaumastella.
