= Dorungar Rural District =

Rural district in Razavi Khorasan province, Iran

Dorungar Rural District Persian: دهستان درونگر
- Rural District
- Location within Iran
- Coordinates: 37°35′N 58°38′E
- Country: Iran
- Province: Razavi Khorasan
- County: Dargaz
- District: Now Khandan
- Established: 1987
- Capital: Sheykhha

Population (2016)
  - Total: 2,753
- Time zone: UTC+3:30 (IRST)

Dorungar Rural District (Persian: دهستان درونگر) is in Now Khandan District of Dargaz County, Razavi Khorasan province, Iran. Its capital is the village of Sheykhha.

== Demographics ==
=== Population ===
At the time of the 2006 National Census, the rural district's population was 3,296 in 896 households. There were 2,944 inhabitants in 980 households at the following census of 2011. The 2016 census measured the population of the rural district as 2,753 in 945 households. The most populous of its 17 villages was Mohammad Taqi, with 435 people.

=== Other villages in the rural district ===
- Aman Magan
- Arbab
- Avaz Mohammad
- Chenar
- Dust Mohammad
- Gaduganlu
- Jabbar
- Mamadanlu
- Mohammad Vali
- Qaruchan
- Qelichabad
- Rahmanqoli
- Sang-e Surakh
- Seyyedha
- Tagan
