= Sar Jangal, Razavi Khorasan =

Village in Razavi Khorasan province, Iran

Sar Jangal Persian: سرجنگل
- Village
- Location within Iran
- Coordinates: 36°35′08″N 60°14′38″E
- Country: Iran
- Province: Razavi Khorasan
- County: Kalat
- District: Zavin
- Rural District: Pasakuh

Population (2016)
  - Total: 201
- Time zone: UTC+3:30 (IRST)

Sar Jangal (Persian: سرجنگل) is a village in Pasakuh Rural District of Zavin District in Kalat County, Razavi Khorasan province, Iran.

== Demographics ==
=== Population ===
At the time of the 2006 National Census, the village's population was 240 in 54 households. The following census in 2011 counted 248 people in 67 households. The 2016 census measured the population of the village as 201 people in 61 households.
