= Qelichabad, Dargaz =

Village in Razavi Khorasan province, Iran

Qelichabad Persian: قليچ اباد
- Village
- Location within Iran
- Coordinates: 37°36′59″N 58°38′50″E
- Country: Iran
- Province: Razavi Khorasan
- County: Dargaz
- District: Now Khandan
- Rural District: Dorungar

Population (2016)
  - Total: 196
- Time zone: UTC+3:30 (IRST)

Qelichabad (Persian: قليچ اباد) (Note: Also romanized as Qelīchābād; formerly known as Ḩājjī Qelīch Khān (حاجي قلیچ خان); also known as Ḩājj Qelīch Khān (حاج قلیچ خان)) is a village in Dorungar Rural District of Now Khandan District in Dargaz County, Razavi Khorasan province, Iran.

== Demographics ==
=== Population ===
At the time of the 2006 National Census, the village's population was 253 in 67 households. The following census in 2011 counted 206 people in 88 households. The 2016 census measured the population of the village as 196 people in 68 households.
