= Dowsari =

City in Kerman province, Iran

Dowsari Persian: دوساري
- City
- Location within Iran
- Coordinates: 28°25′46″N 57°56′31″E
- Country: Iran
- Province: Kerman
- County: Anbarabad
- District: Central

Population (2016)
  - Total: 4,130
- Time zone: UTC+3:30 (IRST)

Dowsari (Persian: دوساري) (Note: Also romanized as Do Sārī, Dow Sari, Dow Sārī, and Dūsāri; also known as Ḩaşārī) is a city in the Central District of Anbarabad County, Kerman province, Iran, serving as the administrative center for Jahadabad Rural District.

== Demographics ==
=== Population ===
At the time of the 2006 National Census, Dowsari's population was 5,620 in 1,028 households, when it was a village in Jahadabad Rural District. The following census in 2011 counted 3,762 people in 965 households, by which time the village had been elevated to the status of a city. The 2016 census measured the population of the city as 4,130 people in 1,234 households.
