= Chahchaheh =

Village in Razavi Khorasan province, Iran

Chahchaheh Persian: چهچهه
- Village
- Location within Iran
- Coordinates: 36°38′26″N 60°19′42″E
- Country: Iran
- Province: Razavi Khorasan
- County: Kalat
- District: Zavin
- Rural District: Pasakuh

Population (2016)
  - Total: 415
- Time zone: UTC+3:30 (IRST)

Chahchaheh (Persian: چهچهه) is a village in Pasakuh Rural District of Zavin District in Kalat County, Razavi Khorasan province, Iran.

== Demographics ==
=== Population ===
At the time of the 2006 National Census, the village's population was 584 in 126 households. The following census in 2011 counted 446 people in 116 households. The 2016 census measured the population of the village as 415 people in 119 households.
