= Qelichabad, Kalat =

Village in Razavi Khorasan province, Iran

Qelichabad Persian: قليچ اباد
- Village
- Location within Iran
- Coordinates: 36°49′31″N 60°09′53″E
- Country: Iran
- Province: Razavi Khorasan
- County: Kalat
- District: Zavin
- Rural District: Zavin

Population (2016)
  - Total: 810
- Time zone: UTC+3:30 (IRST)

Qelichabad (Persian: قليچ اباد) (Note: Also romanized as Qelīchābād; also known as Shahīd Honarmand, Shahīd Mehdī Honarmand (شهيد مهدئ هنرمند), and Shahīd Moḩammad Honarmand) is a village in Zavin Rural District of Zavin District in Kalat County, Razavi Khorasan province, Iran.

== Demographics ==
=== Population ===
At the time of the 2006 National Census, the village's population was 1,088 in 285 households. The following census in 2011 counted 995 people in 305 households. The 2016 census measured the population of the village as 810 people in 264 households.
