= Palkanlu-ye Olya =

Village in Razavi Khorasan province, Iran

Palkanlu-ye Olya Persian: پالكانلوعليا
- Village
- Location within Iran
- Coordinates: 37°34′03″N 58°53′09″E
- Country: Iran
- Province: Razavi Khorasan
- County: Dargaz
- District: Now Khandan
- Rural District: Shahrestaneh

Population (2016)
  - Total: 303
- Time zone: UTC+3:30 (IRST)

Palkanlu-ye Olya (Persian: پالكانلوعليا) (Note: Also romanized as Pālkanlū-ye ‘Olyā; also known as Palkanlu, Pālkānlū-ye Bālā, and Pānkānlū-ye ‘Olyā) is a village in Shahrestaneh Rural District of Now Khandan District in Dargaz County, Razavi Khorasan province, Iran.

== Demographics ==
=== Population ===
At the time of the 2006 National Census, the village's population was 408 in 113 households. The following census in 2011 counted 399 people in 109 households. The 2016 census measured the population of the village as 303 people in 98 households.
