= Shuy, Razavi Khorasan =

Village in Razavi Khorasan province, Iran

Shuy Persian: شوي
- Village
- Location within Iran
- Coordinates: 37°33′45″N 58°46′45″E
- Country: Iran
- Province: Razavi Khorasan
- County: Dargaz
- District: Now Khandan
- Rural District: Shahrestaneh

Population (2016)
  - Total: 340
- Time zone: UTC+3:30 (IRST)

Shuy (Persian: شوي) (Note: Also romanized as Shevey, Shevy, Shooy, and Shūy; also known as Shevāīyā, Shevey-e Vasaţ, Shīvī, and Shiwa) is a village in Shahrestaneh Rural District of Now Khandan District in Dargaz County, Razavi Khorasan province, Iran.

== Demographics ==
=== Population ===
At the time of the 2006 National Census, the village's population was 431 in 108 households. The following census in 2011 counted 335 people in 102 households. The 2016 census measured the population of the village as 340 people in 112 households.
