= Shahr-e Zow =

City in Razavi Khorasan province, Iran

Shahr-e Zow Persian: شهر زو
- City
- Location within Iran
- Coordinates: 36°44′58″N 59°56′03″E
- Country: Iran
- Province: Razavi Khorasan
- County: Kalat
- District: Zavin
- Established as a city: 2005

Population (2016)
  - Total: 3,745
- Time zone: UTC+3:30 (IRST)

Shahr-e Zow (Persian: شهر زو) (Note: Formerly, Zavini-ye Pa'in (زاوینی پائین), also romanized as Zāvīn-e Pa’īn and Zāvīnī-ye Pā’īn, also known as Zao Pāīn, Zoo Sofla, Zow Soflā, Zow-e Pā’īn, and Zū-ye Soflá) is a city in, and the capital of, Zavin District in Kalat County, Razavi Khorasan province, Iran. It also serves as the administrative center for Zavin Rural District. After merging with other villages, the village of Zow-e Sofla was converted to the city of Shahr-e Zow in 2005.

== Demographics ==
=== Population ===
At the time of the 2006 National Census, the city's population was 4,053 in 959 households. The following census in 2011 counted 4,089 people in 1,094 households. The 2016 census measured the population of the city as 3,745 people in 1,147 households.
