= Zeyndanlu-ye Sofla =

Village in Razavi Khorasan province, Iran

Zeyndanlu-ye Sofla Persian: زيندانلوسفلي
- Village
- Location within Iran
- Coordinates: 37°36′02″N 58°48′36″E
- Country: Iran
- Province: Razavi Khorasan
- County: Dargaz
- District: Now Khandan
- Rural District: Shahrestaneh

Population (2016)
  - Total: 267
- Time zone: UTC+3:30 (IRST)

Zeyndanlu-ye Sofla (Persian: زيندانلوسفلي) (Note: Also romanized as Zeyndānlū-ye Soflá; also known as Zeydānlū and Zeydānlūy-e Pā’īn) is a village in Shahrestaneh Rural District of Now Khandan District in Dargaz County, Razavi Khorasan province, Iran.

== Demographics ==
=== Population ===
At the time of the 2006 National Census, the village's population was 361 in 77 households. The following census in 2011 counted 363 people in 112 households. The 2016 census measured the population of the village as 267 people in 84 households.
