= Chenar, Kalat =

City in Razavi Khorasan province, Iran

Chenar Persian: چنار
- City
- Location within Iran
- Coordinates: 36°41′31″N 59°58′37″E
- Country: Iran
- Province: Razavi Khorasan
- County: Kalat
- District: Zavin
- Established as a city: 2021

Population (2016)
  - Total: 3,597
- Time zone: UTC+3:30 (IRST)

Chenar (Persian: چنار) (Note: Also romanized as Chanār and Chenār; also known as Chinār) is a city in Zavin District of Kalat County, Razavi Khorasan province, Iran.

== Demographics ==
=== Population ===
At the time of the 2006 National Census, Chenar's population was 3,566 in 709 households, when it was a village in Zavin Rural District. The following census in 2011 counted 3,509 people in 815 households. The 2016 census measured the population of the village as 3,597 people in 943 households, the most populous in its rural district.

Chenar was converted to a city in 2021.
