= Tahuneh Ostad =

Tahuneh Ostad طاحونه استاد
- Village
- Location within Iran
- Coordinates: 29°57′33″N 56°25′59″E
- Country: Iran
- Province: Kerman
- County: Bardsir
- Bakhsh: Central
- Rural District: Kuh Panj

Population (2006)
  - Total: 78
- Time zone: UTC+3:30 (IRST)
  - Summer (DST): UTC+4:30 (IRDT)

Tahuneh Ostad (Persian: طاحونه استاد, also Romanized as Ţāhūneh Ostād; also known as Asīyāb Ostād (Persian: اسياب استاد), Tahoomeh Ostad, Ţāhū’īyeh Ostād, and Ţākhūneh Ostād) is a village in Kuh Panj Rural District, in the Central District of Bardsir County, Kerman Province, Iran. At the 2006 census, its population was 78, in 16 families.
