= Poshteh Konji =

Poshteh Konji پشته كنجي
- Village
- Location within Iran
- Coordinates: 27°56′24″N 56°38′56″E
- Country: Iran
- Province: Hormozgan
- County: Hajjiabad
- Bakhsh: Ahmadi
- Rural District: Ahmadi

Population (2006)
  - Total: 231
- Time zone: UTC+3:30 (IRST)
  - Summer (DST): UTC+4:30 (IRDT)

Poshteh Konji (Persian: پشته كنجي, also Romanized as Poshteh Konjī) is a village in Ahmadi Rural District, Ahmadi District, Hajjiabad County, Hormozgan Province, Iran. At the 2006 census, its population was 231, in 50 families.
