= Asiab-e Tanureh =

Asiab-e Tanureh اسياب تنوره
- Village
- Location within Iran
- Coordinates: 34°27′31″N 46°10′04″E
- Country: Iran
- Province: Kermanshah
- County: Dalahu
- Bakhsh: Central
- Rural District: Bivanij

Population (2006)
  - Total: 97
- Time zone: UTC+3:30 (IRST)
  - Summer (DST): UTC+4:30 (IRDT)

Asiab-e Tanureh (Persian: اسياب تنوره, also Romanized as Āsīāb-e Tanūreh; also known as Āsīāb-e Mūsá) is a village in Bivanij Rural District, in the Central District of Dalahu County, Kermanshah Province, Iran. At the 2006 census, its population was 97, in 21 families.
