= Sar Bagh-e Shah Hormozd =

Sar Bagh-e Shah Hormozd سرباغ شاهرمزد
- Village
- Location within Iran
- Coordinates: 30°51′06″N 56°38′04″E
- Country: Iran
- Province: Kerman
- County: Zarand
- Bakhsh: Central
- Rural District: Vahdat

Population (2006)
  - Total: 144
- Time zone: UTC+3:30 (IRST)
  - Summer (DST): UTC+4:30 (IRDT)

Sar Bagh-e Shah Hormozd (Persian: سرباغ شاهرمزد, also Romanized as Sar Bāgh-e Shāh Hormozd; also known as Āsīāb-e Shāh Teymūr, Sar Bāgh-e Shāh Hormoz, Shāh Hormoz, and Shahormoz; and Anglicized to Taimur's Garden) is a village in Vahdat Rural District, in the Central District of Zarand County, Kerman Province, Iran. At the 2006 census, its population was 144, in 40 families.
