= Poshteh-ye Olya =

Poshteh-ye Olya پشته عليا
- Village
- Location within Iran
- Coordinates: 33°38′30″N 48°49′57″E
- Country: Iran
- Province: Lorestan
- County: Dorud
- Bakhsh: Silakhor
- Rural District: Chalanchulan

Population (2006)
  - Total: 79
- Time zone: UTC+3:30 (IRST)
  - Summer (DST): UTC+4:30 (IRDT)

Poshteh-ye Olya (Persian: پشته عليا, also Romanized as Poshteh-ye ‘Olyā; also known as Poshteh-ye Bālā) is a village in Chalanchulan Rural District, Silakhor District, Dorud County, Lorestan Province, Iran. At the 2006 census, its population was 79, in 17 families.
