= Posht Shiran =

Posht Shiran پشت شيران
- Village
- Location within Iran
- Coordinates: 30°28′49″N 57°16′42″E
- Country: Iran
- Province: Kerman
- County: Kerman
- Bakhsh: Central
- Rural District: Derakhtengan

Population (2006)
  - Total: 159
- Time zone: UTC+3:30 (IRST)
  - Summer (DST): UTC+4:30 (IRDT)

Posht Shiran (Persian: پشت شيران, also Romanized as Posht Shīrān and Posht-e Shīrān; also known as Poshteh Shīrān) is a village in Derakhtengan Rural District, in the Central District of Kerman County, Kerman Province, Iran. At the 2006 census, its population was 159, in 46 families.
