= Poshteh, Kurdistan =

Poshteh پشته
- Village
- Location within Iran
- Coordinates: 34°48′59″N 46°44′46″E
- Country: Iran
- Province: Kurdistan
- County: Kamyaran
- Bakhsh: Central
- Rural District: Shahu

Population (2006)
  - Total: 252
- Time zone: UTC+3:30 (IRST)
  - Summer (DST): UTC+4:30 (IRDT)

Poshteh (Persian: پشته) is a village in Shahu Rural District, in the Central District of Kamyaran County, Kurdistan Province, Iran. At the 2006 census, its population was 252, in 61 families. The village is populated by Kurds.
