= Isavli =

Isavli عيسولي
- Village
- Location within Iran
- Coordinates: 35°39′30″N 46°26′34″E
- Country: Iran
- Province: Kurdistan
- County: Marivan
- Bakhsh: Sarshiv
- Rural District: Sarshiv

Population (2006)
  - Total: 250
- Time zone: UTC+3:30 (IRST)
  - Summer (DST): UTC+4:30 (IRDT)

Isavli (Persian: عيسولي, also romanized as ‘Īsavlī; also known as Asavaleh, Āsīab, Esāveleh, Īsauleh, Īsowleh, and ‘Īsūleh) is a village in Sarshiv Rural District, Sarshiv District, Marivan County, Kurdistan Province, Iran. At the 2006 census, its population was 250, in 52 families. The village is populated by Kurds.
