= Fazelabad-e Talkhab =

Fazelabad-e Talkhab فاضل ابادتلخاب
- Village
- Country: Iran
- Province: Kohgiluyeh and Boyer-Ahmad
- County: Charam
- Bakhsh: Sarfaryab
- Rural District: Sarfaryab

Population (2006)
  - Total: 51
- Time zone: UTC+3:30 (IRST)
  - Summer (DST): UTC+4:30 (IRDT)

Fazelabad-e Talkhab (Persian: فاضل ابادتلخاب, also Romanized as Fāz̤elābād-e Talkhāb) is a village in Sarfaryab Rural District, Sarfaryab District, Charam County, Kohgiluyeh and Boyer-Ahmad Province, Iran. At the 2006 census, its population was 51, in 9 families.
