= Taherabad, Lali =

Taherabad طاهراباد
- Village
- Location within Iran
- Coordinates: 32°27′13″N 49°04′18″E
- Country: Iran
- Province: Khuzestan
- County: Lali
- Bakhsh: Hati
- Rural District: Jastun Shah

Population (2006)
  - Total: 176
- Time zone: UTC+3:30 (IRST)
  - Summer (DST): UTC+4:30 (IRDT)

Taherabad (Persian: طاهراباد, also Romanized as Ţāherābād) is a village in taherabad Rural District, Hati District, Lali County, Khuzestan Province, Iran. At the 2006 census, its population was 176, in 33 families.
