= Poshteh-ye Isin =

Poshteh-ye Isin پشته ايسين
- Village
- Location within Iran
- Coordinates: 27°18′24″N 56°17′37″E
- Country: Iran
- Province: Hormozgan
- County: Bandar Abbas
- Bakhsh: Central
- Rural District: Isin

Population (2006)
  - Total: 1,818
- Time zone: UTC+3:30 (IRST)
  - Summer (DST): UTC+4:30 (IRDT)

Poshteh-ye Isin (Persian: پشته ايسين, also Romanized as Poshteh-ye Īsīn) is a village in Isin Rural District, in the Central District of Bandar Abbas County, Hormozgan Province, Iran. At the 2006 census, its population was 1,818, in 428 families.
