= Fazlabad, Sabzevar =

Fazlabad فضل اباد
- Village
- Location within Iran
- Coordinates: 35°49′13″N 57°19′45″E
- Country: Iran
- Province: Razavi Khorasan
- County: Sabzevar
- Bakhsh: Rud Ab
- Rural District: Kuh Hamayi

Population (2006)
  - Total: 63
- Time zone: UTC+3:30 (IRST)
  - Summer (DST): UTC+4:30 (IRDT)

Fazlabad (Persian: فضل اباد, also Romanized as Faẕlābād) is a village in Kuh Hamayi Rural District, Rud Ab District, Sabzevar County, Razavi Khorasan Province, Iran. As of the 2006 census, its population was 63, with 20 families in the village.
