= Tahuneh-ye Qazi =

Tahuneh-ye Qazi طاحونه قاضي
- Village
- Location within Iran
- Coordinates: 29°20′59″N 56°24′56″E
- Country: Iran
- Province: Kerman
- County: Baft
- Bakhsh: Central
- Rural District: Fathabad

Population (2006)
  - Total: 134
- Time zone: UTC+3:30 (IRST)
  - Summer (DST): UTC+4:30 (IRDT)

Tahuneh-ye Qazi (Persian: طاحونه قاضي, also Romanized as Ţāḥūneh-ye Qāz̤ī; also known as Asīyāb-e Qāz̤ī (Persian: اسياب قاضي) and Asīyābqāz̤ī) is a village in Fathabad Rural District, in the Central District of Baft County, Kerman Province, Iran. At the 2006 census, its population was 134, in 34 families.
