= Pagodar, Faryab =

Pagodar پاگدار
- Village
- Location within Iran
- Coordinates: 28°02′30″N 57°16′03″E
- Country: Iran
- Province: Kerman
- County: Faryab
- Bakhsh: Central
- Rural District: Golashkerd

Population (2006)
  - Total: 175
- Time zone: UTC+3:30 (IRST)
  - Summer (DST): UTC+4:30 (IRDT)

Pagodar (Persian: پاگدار, also Romanized as Pāgodār) is a village in Golashkerd Rural District, in the Central District of Faryab County, Kerman Province, Iran. At the 2006 census, its population was 175, in 43 families.
