= Pagodar-e Badvar =

Pagodar-e Badvar پاگداربادور
- Village
- Location within Iran
- Coordinates: 35°31′43″N 59°16′29″E
- Country: Iran
- Province: Razavi Khorasan
- County: Torbat-e Heydarieh
- Bakhsh: Jolgeh Rokh
- Rural District: Mian Rokh

Population (2006)
  - Total: 185
- Time zone: UTC+3:30 (IRST)
  - Summer (DST): UTC+4:30 (IRDT)

Pagodar-e Badvar (Persian: پاگداربادور, also Romanized as Pāgodār-e Bādvar) is a village in Mian Rokh Rural District, Jolgeh Rokh District, Torbat-e Heydarieh County, Razavi Khorasan Province, Iran. At the 2006 census, its population was 185, in 48 families.
