= Asiyab-e Shekasteh =

Asiyab-e Shekasteh اسياب شكسته
- Village
- Location within Iran
- Coordinates: 31°55′14″N 49°33′14″E
- Country: Iran
- Province: Khuzestan
- County: Masjed Soleyman
- Bakhsh: Golgir
- Rural District: Tolbozan

Population (2006)
  - Total: 45
- Time zone: UTC+3:30 (IRST)
  - Summer (DST): UTC+4:30 (IRDT)

Asiyab-e Shekasteh (Persian: اسياب شكسته, also Romanized as Āsīyāb-e Shekasteh) is a village in Tolbozan Rural District, Golgir District, Masjed Soleyman County, Khuzestan Province, Iran. At the 2006 census, its population was 45, in 6 families.
