= Asiab Sham =

Asiab Sham آسياب شم
- Village
- Location within Iran
- Coordinates: 37°41′35″N 48°52′57″E
- Country: Iran
- Province: Gilan
- County: Talesh
- Bakhsh: Asalem
- Rural District: Kharajgil

Population (2016)
  - Total: 157
- Time zone: UTC+3:30 (IRST)

Asiab Sham (Persian: آسياب شم, also Romanized as Āsīāb Sham‘) is a village in Kharajgil Rural District, Asalem District, Talesh County, Gilan Province, in northwestern Iran. At the 2006 census, its population was 169, in 37 families. In 2016, its population was 157, in 40 households.
