= Poshteh, Kerman =

Poshteh پشته
- Village
- Location within Iran
- Coordinates: 30°27′30″N 57°32′18″E
- Country: Iran
- Province: Kerman
- County: Kerman
- Bakhsh: Central
- Rural District: Derakhtengan

Population (2006)
  - Total: 25
- Time zone: UTC+3:30 (IRST)
  - Summer (DST): UTC+4:30 (IRDT)

Poshteh (Persian: پشته; also known as Bīsheh) is a village in Derakhtengan Rural District, in the Central District of Kerman County, Kerman Province, Iran. At the 2006 census, its population was 25, in 8 families.
