= Sar Jangal, Rezvan =

Sar Jangal سرجنگل
- Village
- Location within Iran
- Coordinates: 28°42′02″N 57°55′47″E
- Country: Iran
- Province: Kerman
- County: Jiroft
- Bakhsh: Jebalbarez
- Rural District: Rezvan

Population (2006)
  - Total: 111
- Time zone: UTC+3:30 (IRST)
  - Summer (DST): UTC+4:30 (IRDT)

Sar Jangal (Persian: سرجنگل) is a village in Rezvan Rural District, Jebalbarez District, Jiroft County, Kerman Province, Iran. At the 2006 census, its population was 111, in 24 families.
