= Poshteh-ye Yek =

Poshteh-ye Yek پشته۱
- Village
- Location within Iran
- Coordinates: 29°30′56″N 56°25′03″E
- Country: Iran
- Province: Kerman
- County: Baft
- Bakhsh: Central
- Rural District: Gughar

Population (2006)
  - Total: 36
- Time zone: UTC+3:30 (IRST)
  - Summer (DST): UTC+4:30 (IRDT)

Poshteh-ye Yek (Persian: پشته۱; also known as Poshteh) is a village in Gughar Rural District, in the Central District of Baft County, Kerman Province, Iran. At the 2006 census, its population was 36, in 8 families.
