= Fazelabad, Ilam =

Fazelabad فاضل اباد
- Village
- Location within Iran
- Coordinates: 33°12′58″N 47°16′34″E
- Country: Iran
- Province: Ilam
- County: Darreh Shahr
- Bakhsh: Central
- Rural District: Zarrin Dasht

Population (2006)
  - Total: 425
- Time zone: UTC+3:30 (IRST)
  - Summer (DST): UTC+4:30 (IRDT)

Fazelabad (Persian: فاضل اباد, also Romanized as Fāẕelābād and Fazlābād) is a village in Zarrin Dasht Rural District, in the Central District of Darreh Shahr County, Ilam Province, Iran. At the 2006 census, its population was 425, in 72 families. The village is populated by Lurs.
