= Poshteh Talang =

Poshteh Talang پشته تلنگ
- Village
- Location within Iran
- Coordinates: 26°51′33″N 57°15′09″E
- Country: Iran
- Province: Hormozgan
- County: Minab
- Bakhsh: Central
- Rural District: Karian

Population (2006)
  - Total: 245
- Time zone: UTC+3:30 (IRST)
  - Summer (DST): UTC+4:30 (IRDT)

Poshteh Talang (Persian: پشته تلنگ) is a village in Karian Rural District, in the Central District of Minab County, Hormozgan Province, Iran. At the 2006 census, its population was 245, in 59 families.
