= Poshteh-ye Sofla =

Poshteh-ye Sofla پشته سفلي
- Village
- Location within Iran
- Coordinates: 33°37′48″N 48°51′24″E
- Country: Iran
- Province: Lorestan
- County: Dorud
- Bakhsh: Silakhor
- Rural District: Chalanchulan

Population (2006)
  - Total: 87
- Time zone: UTC+3:30 (IRST)
  - Summer (DST): UTC+4:30 (IRDT)

Poshteh-ye Sofla (Persian: پشته سفلي, also Romanized as Poshteh-ye Soflá; also known as Poshteh Pā’īn and Poshteh-ye Pā’īn) is a village in Chalanchulan Rural District, Silakhor District, Dorud County, Lorestan Province, Iran. At the 2006 census, its population was 87, in 21 families.
