= Now Khandan =

City in Razavi Khorasan province, Iran

Now Khandan Persian: نوخندان
- City
- Location within Iran
- Coordinates: 37°31′07″N 58°59′23″E
- Country: Iran
- Province: Razavi Khorasan
- County: Dargaz
- District: Now Khandan

Population (2016)
  - Total: 2,634
- Time zone: UTC+3:30 (IRST)

Now Khandan (Persian: نوخندان) (Note: Also romanized as Nau Khāndān and Nowkhandān) is a city in, and the capital of, Now Khandan District in Dargaz County, Razavi Khorasan province, Iran.

== Demographics ==
=== Population ===
At the time of the 2006 National Census, the city's population was 2,751 in 774 households. The following census in 2011 counted 2,662 people in 768 households. The 2016 census measured the population of the city as 2,634 people in 862 households.
