= Sar Jangal, Anbarabad =

Sar Jangal سرجنگل
- Village
- Location within Iran
- Coordinates: 28°14′39″N 58°20′31″E
- Country: Iran
- Province: Kerman
- County: Anbarabad
- Bakhsh: Jebalbarez-e Jonubi
- Rural District: Nargesan

Population (2006)
  - Total: 313
- Time zone: UTC+3:30 (IRST)
  - Summer (DST): UTC+4:30 (IRDT)

Sar Jangal (Persian: سرجنگل) is a village in Nargesan Rural District, Jebalbarez-e Jonubi District, Anbarabad County, Kerman Province, Iran. At the 2006 census, its population was 313, in 70 families.
