= Poshteh-ye Mazaj =

Poshteh-ye Mazaj پشته مازج
- Village
- Location within Iran
- Coordinates: 28°19′47″N 57°01′27″E
- Country: Iran
- Province: Kerman
- County: Faryab
- Bakhsh: Central
- Rural District: Hur

Population (2006)
  - Total: 73
- Time zone: UTC+3:30 (IRST)
  - Summer (DST): UTC+4:30 (IRDT)

Poshteh-ye Mazaj (Persian: پشته مازج, also Romanized as Poshteh-ye Māzaj) is a village in Hur Rural District, in the Central District of Faryab County, Kerman Province, Iran. At the 2006 census, its population was 73, in 17 families.
