= Pa Godar, Razavi Khorasan =

Pa Godar پاگدار
- Village
- Location within Iran
- Coordinates: 35°26′12″N 59°37′52″E
- Country: Iran
- Province: Razavi Khorasan
- County: Zaveh
- Bakhsh: Central
- Rural District: Safaiyeh

Population (2006)
  - Total: 150
- Time zone: UTC+3:30 (IRST)
  - Summer (DST): UTC+4:30 (IRDT)

Pa Godar (Persian: پاگدار, also Romanized as Pā Godār) is a village in Safaiyeh Rural District, in the Central District of Zaveh County, Razavi Khorasan Province, Iran. At the 2006 census, its population was 150, in 41 families.
