= Poshteh-ye Gurband =

Village in Hormozgan, Iran

Poshteh-ye Gurband پشته گوربند
- Village
- Location within Iran
- Coordinates: 27°19′29″N 56°59′46″E
- Country: Iran
- Province: Hormozgan
- County: Minab
- Bakhsh: Central
- Rural District: Gurband

Population (2006)
  - Total: 649
- Time zone: UTC+3:30 (IRST)
  - Summer (DST): UTC+4:30 (IRDT)

Poshteh-ye Gurband (Persian: پشته گوربند, also Romanized as Poshteh-ye Gūrband) is a village in Gurband Rural District, in the Central District of Minab County, Hormozgan Province, Iran. At the 2006 census, its population was 649, in 158 families.
