= Aliabad Rural District (Anbarabad County) =

Rural district in Kerman province, Iran

Aliabad Rural District Persian: دهستان علي آباد
- Rural District
- Location within Iran
- Coordinates: 28°25′13″N 57°50′57″E
- Country: Iran
- Province: Kerman
- County: Anbarabad
- District: Central
- Capital: Aliabad-e Qadiri

Population (2016)
  - Total: 10,635
- Time zone: UTC+3:30 (IRST)

Aliabad Rural District (Persian: دهستان علي آباد) is in the Central District of Anbarabad County, Kerman province, Iran. Its capital is the village of Aliabad-e Qadiri.

== Demographics ==
=== Population ===
At the time of the 2006 National Census, the rural district's population was 7,968 in 1,727 households. There were 10,312 inhabitants in 2,603 households at the following census of 2011. The 2016 census measured the population of the rural district as 10,635 in 2,926 households. The most populous of its 23 villages was Aliabad-e Qadiri, with 2,041 people.
