= Zavin Rural District =

Rural district in Razavi Khorasan province, Iran

Zavin Rural District Persian: دهستان زاوين
- Rural District
- Location within Iran
- Coordinates: 36°46′N 59°57′E
- Country: Iran
- Province: Razavi Khorasan
- County: Kalat
- District: Zavin
- Established: 1986
- Capital: Shahr-e Zow

Population (2016)
  - Total: 7,626
- Time zone: UTC+3:30 (IRST)

Zavin Rural District (Persian: دهستان زاوين) is in Zavin District of Kalat County, Razavi Khorasan province, Iran. It is administered from the city of Shahr-e Zow. (Note: Formerly the village of Zow-e Sofla)

== Demographics ==
=== Population ===
At the time of the 2006 National Census, the rural district's population was 8,932 in 2,045 households. There were 8,408 inhabitants in 2,242 households at the following census of 2011. The 2016 census measured the population of the rural district as 7,626 in 2,200 households. The most populous of its 13 villages was Chenar (now a city), with 3,597 people.

=== Other villages in the rural district ===
- Bagh Kand
- Owrtakand
- Qaleh Now
- Qarah Tikan
- Qelichabad
- Sar Rud
