= Mohammadabad Rural District (Anbarabad County) =

Rural district in Kerman province, Iran

Mohammadabad Rural District Persian: دهستان محمدآباد
- Rural District
- Location within Iran
- Coordinates: 28°30′43″N 57°52′56″E
- Country: Iran
- Province: Kerman
- County: Anbarabad
- District: Central
- Capital: Khezrabad

Population (2016)
  - Total: 6,032
- Time zone: UTC+3:30 (IRST)

Mohammadabad Rural District (Persian: دهستان محمدآباد) is in the Central District of Anbarabad County, Kerman province, Iran. Its capital is the village of Khezrabad.

== Demographics ==
=== Population ===
At the time of the 2006 National Census, the rural district's population was 5,358 in 1,113 households. There were 6,024 inhabitants in 1,539 households at the following census of 2011. The 2016 census measured the population of the rural district as 6,032 in 1,800 households. The most populous of its 34 villages was Khezrabad, with 1,442 people.
