= Jahadabad Rural District =

Rural district in Kerman province, Iran

Jahadabad Rural District Persian: دهستان جهادآباد
- Rural District
- Location within Iran
- Coordinates: 28°21′10″N 57°52′04″E
- Country: Iran
- Province: Kerman
- County: Anbarabad
- District: Central
- Capital: Dowsari

Population (2016)
  - Total: 16,258
- Time zone: UTC+3:30 (IRST)

Jahadabad Rural District (Persian: دهستان جهادآباد) is in the Central District of Anbarabad County, Kerman province, Iran. It is administered from the city of Dowsari.

== Demographics ==
=== Population ===
At the time of the 2006 National Census, the rural district's population was 16,891 in 3,496 households. There were 15,106 inhabitants in 3,891 households at the following census of 2011. The 2016 census measured the population of the rural district as 16,258 in 4,675 households. The most populous of its 48 villages was Rustai-ye Shahid Salari, with 2,097 people.
