= Shahrestaneh Rural District =

Rural district in Razavi Khorasan province, Iran

Shahrestaneh Rural District Persian: دهستان شهرستانه
- Rural District
- Location within Iran
- Coordinates: 37°31′N 58°52′E
- Country: Iran
- Province: Razavi Khorasan
- County: Dargaz
- District: Now Khandan
- Established: 1987
- Capital: Borj-e Qaleh

Population (2016)
  - Total: 4,368
- Time zone: UTC+3:30 (IRST)

Shahrestaneh Rural District (Persian: دهستان شهرستانه) is in Now Khandan District of Dargaz County, Razavi Khorasan province, Iran. Its capital is the village of Borj-e Qaleh.

== Demographics ==
=== Population ===
At the time of the 2006 National Census, the rural district's population was 5,047 in 1,288 households. There were 5,013 inhabitants in 1,428 households at the following census of 2011. The 2016 census measured the population of the rural district as 4,368 in 1,397 households. The most populous of its 22 villages was Jashnabad, with 698 people.

=== Other villages in the rural district ===
- Dowlat Shanlu
- Jolfan
- Khanlanlu
- Palkanlu-ye Olya
- Shuy
- Zeyndanlu-ye Sofla
