= Pasakuh Rural District =

Rural district in Razavi Khorasan province, Iran

Pasakuh Rural District Persian: دهستان پساكوه
- Rural District
- Location within Iran
- Coordinates: 36°36′N 60°13′E
- Country: Iran
- Province: Razavi Khorasan
- County: Kalat
- District: Zavin
- Established: 1986
- Capital: Amirabad

Population (2016)
  - Total: 3,046
- Time zone: UTC+3:30 (IRST)

Pasakuh Rural District (Persian: دهستان پساكوه) is in Zavin District of Kalat County, Razavi Khorasan province, Iran. Its capital is the village of Amirabad.

== Demographics ==
=== Population ===
At the time of the 2006 National Census, the rural district's population was 3,647 in 855 households. There were 3,314 inhabitants in 902 households at the following census of 2011. The 2016 census measured the population of the rural district as 3,046 in 868 households. The most populous of its 34 villages was Abgarm, with 792 people.

=== Other villages in the rural district ===
- Baghgah
- Chahchaheh
- Mowmenabad
- Sar Jangal
- Taherabad-e Torkha Jadid
- Taqiabad
