= Amjaz Rural District =

Rural district in Kerman province, Iran

Amjaz Rural District Persian: دهستان امجز
- Rural District
- Location within Iran
- Coordinates: 28°38′53″N 58°09′36″E
- Country: Iran
- Province: Kerman
- County: Anbarabad
- District: Central
- Capital: Dahaneh-ye Gomrokan

Population (2016)
  - Total: 2,951
- Time zone: UTC+3:30 (IRST)

Amjaz Rural District (Persian: دهستان امجز) is in the Central District of Anbarabad County, Kerman province, Iran. Its capital is the village of Dahaneh-ye Gomrokan.

== Demographics ==
=== Population ===
At the time of the 2006 National Census, the rural district's population was 3,970 in 876 households. There were 3,450 inhabitants in 876 households at the following census of 2011. The 2016 census measured the population of the rural district as 2,951 in 894 households. The most populous of its 122 villages was Amjaz, with 649 people.
