= Zavin District =

District in Razavi Khorasan province, Iran

Zavin District Persian: بخش زاوین
- District
- Interactive map of Zavin District
- Location within Iran
- Coordinates: 36°40′N 60°03′E
- Country: Iran
- Province: Razavi Khorasan
- County: Kalat
- Established: 2003
- Capital: Shahr-e Zow

Population (2016)
  - Total: 14,417
- Time zone: UTC+3:30 (IRST)

Zavin District (Persian: بخش زاوین) is in Kalat County, Razavi Khorasan province, Iran. Its capital is the city of Shahr-e Zow.

== History ==
The village of Chenar was converted to a city in 2021.

== Demographics ==
=== Population ===
At the time of the 2006 census, the district's population was 16,632 in 3,859 households. The following census in 2011 counted 15,811 people in 4,238 households. The 2016 census measured the population of the district as 14,417 inhabitants in 4,215 households.

=== Administrative divisions ===
Zavin District Population
Administrative Divisions	2006	2011	2016
Pasakuh RD	3,647	3,314	3,046
Zavin RD	8,932	8,408	7,626
Chenar (city) (Note: Became a city after the 2016 census)			
Shahr-e Zow (city) (Note: Formerly the village of Zow-e Sofla)	4,053	4,089	3,745
Total	16,632	15,811	14,417
RD = Rural District
