= Now Khandan District =

District in Razavi Khorasan province, Iran

Now Khandan District Persian: بخش نوخندان
- District
- Location within Iran
- Coordinates: 37°32′N 58°49′E
- Country: Iran
- Province: Razavi Khorasan
- County: Dargaz
- Capital: Now Khandan

Population (2016)
  - Total: 9,755
- Time zone: UTC+3:30 (IRST)

Now Khandan District (Persian: بخش نوخندان) is in Dargaz County, Razavi Khorasan province, Iran. Its capital is the city of Now Khandan.

== Demographics ==
=== Population ===
At the time of the 2006 National Census, the district's population was 11,094 in 2,958 households. The following census in 2011 counted 10,619 people in 3,176 households. The 2016 census measured the population of the district as 9,755 inhabitants in 3,204 households.

=== Administrative divisions ===
Now Khandan District Population
Administrative Divisions	2006	2011	2016
Dorungar RD	3,296	2,944	2,753
Shahrestaneh RD	5,047	5,013	4,368
Now Khandan (city)	2,751	2,662	2,634
Total	11,094	10,619	9,755
RD = Rural District
