= Central District (Anbarabad County) =

District in Kerman province, Iran

Central District (Anbarabad County) Persian: بخش مرکزی شهرستان عنبرآباد
- District
- Location within Iran
- Coordinates: 28°29′20″N 57°57′12″E
- Country: Iran
- Province: Kerman
- County: Anbarabad
- Capital: Anbarabad

Population (2016)
  - Total: 58,191
- Time zone: UTC+3:30 (IRST)

The Central District of Anbarabad County (Persian: بخش مرکزی شهرستان عنبرآباد) is in Kerman province, Iran. Its capital is the city of Anbarabad.

== History ==
After the 2006 National Census, the village of Dowsari was elevated to the status of a city.

== Demographics ==
=== Population ===
At the time of the 2006 census, the district's population was 52,777 in 11,209 households. The following census in 2011 counted 57,385 people in 14,406 households. The 2016 census measured the population of the district as 58,191 inhabitants in 16,814 households.

=== Administrative divisions ===
Central District (Anbarabad County) Population
Administrative Divisions	2006	2011	2016
Aliabad RD	7,968	10,312	10,635
Amjaz RD	3,970	3,450	2,951
Jahadabad RD	16,891	15,106	16,258
Mohammadabad RD	5,358	6,024	6,032
Anbarabad (city)	18,590	18,731	18,185
Dowsari (city)		3,762	4,130
Total	52,777	57,385	58,191
RD = Rural District
