= Hoseynabad =

Hoseynabad (sometimes also spelled Hoseinabad, Hoseyn Abad or Hosein Abad) (Persian: حسین‌آباد) is a common name for villages in Iran. It may refer to:

== Alborz Province ==
- Hoseynabad, Alborz, a village in Nazarabad County
- Hoseynabad-e Kushk Zar, a village in Savojbolagh County

== Bushehr Province ==
- Hoseynabad, Dashtestan, a village in Dashtestan County
- Hoseynabad, Jam, a village in Jam County
- Hoseynabad, Riz, a village in Jam County

== Chaharmahal and Bakhtiari Province ==
- Hoseynabad, Ardal, a village in Ardal County
- Hoseynabad, Borujen, a village in Borujen County
- Hoseynabad, Kuhrang, a village in Kuhrang County
- Hoseynabad, Lordegan, a village in Lordegan County

== East Azerbaijan Province ==
- Hoseynabad, Heris, a village in Heris County
- Hoseynabad, Malekan, a village in Malekan County

== Fars Province ==
=== Arsanjan County ===
- Hoseynabad, Arsanjan, a village in Arsanjan County
- Hoseynabad, Khobriz, a village in Arsanjan County
- Hoseynabad-e Katak, a village in Arsanjan County
- Hoseynabad-e Najafabad, a village in Arsanjan County

=== Bavanat County ===
- Hoseynabad, Bavanat, a village in Bavanat County
- Hoseynabad, Bagh Safa, a village in Bavanat County

=== Darab County ===
- Hoseynabad, Balesh, a village in Darab County
- Hoseynabad, Paskhan, a village in Darab County
- Hoseynabad, Rostaq, a village in Darab County
- Hoseynabad-e Jadid, Darab, a village in Darab County

=== Eqlid County ===
- Hoseynabad, Eqlid, a village in Eqlid County

=== Farashband County ===
- Hoseynabad, Farashband, a village in Farashband County

=== Fasa County ===
- Hoseynabad, Fasa, a village in Fasa County
- Hoseynabad, Kushk-e Qazi, a village in Fasa County
- Hoseynabad, Now Bandegan, a village in Fasa County
- Hoseynabad, Sheshdeh and Qarah Bulaq, a village in Fasa County
- Hoseynabad, Shibkaveh, a village in Fasa County

=== Firuzabad County ===
- Hoseynabad-e Saravi, a village in Firuzabad County
- Hoseynabad-e Sargar, a village in Firuzabad County

=== Gerash County ===
- Hoseynabad, Gerash, a village in Gerash County

=== Jahrom County ===
- Hoseynabad-e Ghebleh, a village in Jahrom County
- Hoseynabad, Jahrom, a village in Jahrom County

=== Kazerun County ===
- Hoseynabad, Chenar Shahijan, a village in Kazerun County
- Hoseynabad, Dadin, a village in Kazerun County
- Hoseynabad, Khesht, a village in Kazerun County

=== Kharameh County ===
- Hoseynabad, Kharameh, a village in Kharameh County

=== Khonj County ===
- Hoseynabad, Khonj, a village in Khonj County

=== Lamerd County ===
- Hoseynabad-e Tarman, a village in Lamerd County

=== Larestan County ===
- Hoseynabad, Larestan, a village in Larestan County
- Hoseynabad, Beyram, a village in Larestan County
- Hoseynabad-e Barkeh Puz, a village in Larestan County

=== Marvdasht County ===
- Hoseynabad, Marvdasht, a village in Marvdasht County
- Hoseynabad, Doruzdan, a village in Marvdasht County
- Hoseynabad, Kamfiruz, a village in Marvdasht County
- Hoseynabad, Ramjerd-e Do, a village in Marvdasht County
- Hoseynabad, Rudbal, a village in Marvdasht County
- Hoseynabad Kamin, a village in Marvdasht County

=== Neyriz County ===
- Hoseynabad, Abadeh Tashk, a village in Neyriz County
- Hoseynabad, Qatruyeh, a village in Neyriz County
- Hoseynabad-e Surmaq, a village in Neyriz County

=== Pasargad County ===
- Hoseynabad, Kamin, a village in Pasargad County
- Hoseynabad, Sarpaniran, a village in Pasargad County

=== Rostam County ===
- Hoseynabad, Rostam, a village in Rostam County

=== Sepidan County ===
- Hoseynabad, Sepidan, a village in Sepidan County
- Hoseynabad, Sornabad, a village in Sepidan County
- Hoseynabad-e Sarab, a village in Sepidan County

=== Shiraz County ===
- Hoseynabad, Shiraz, a village in Shiraz County
- Hoseynabad, Arzhan, a village in Shiraz County
- Hoseynabad, Zarqan, a village in Shiraz County

== Gilan Province ==
- Hoseynabad, Amlash, a village in Amlash County
- Hoseynabad, Fuman, a village in Fuman County
- Hoseynabad, Langarud, a village in Langarud County
- Hoseynabad-e Chaf, a village in Langarud County
- Hoseynabad, Rudsar, a village in Rudsar County

== Golestan Province ==
- Hoseynabad, Aliabad, a village in Aliabad County
- Hoseynabad, Bandar-e Gaz, a village in Bandar-e Gaz County
- Hoseynabad, Galikash, a village in Galikash County
- Hoseynabad-e Qorbani, Galikash, a village in Galikash County
- Hoseynabad-e Malek, a village in Gorgan County
- Hoseynabad-e Qorbani, Ramian, a village in Ramian County
- Hoseynabad-e Sistaniha, a village in Ramian County
- Hoseynabad-e Tappeh Sari, a village in Ramian County

== Hamadan Province ==
- Hoseynabad, Asadabad, a village in Asadabad County
- Hoseynabad, Bahar, a village in Bahar County
- Hoseynabad-e Bahar, a village in Bahar County
- Hoseynabad-e Latka, a village in Bahar County
- Hoseynabad, Kabudarahang, a village in Kabudarahang County
- Hoseynabad-e Nazem, a village in Malayer County
- Hoseynabad-e Qosh Bolagh, a village in Malayer County
- Hoseynabad-e Shamlu, a village in Malayer County
- Hoseynabad, Nahavand, a village in Nahavand County
- Hoseynabad-e Chulak, a village in Nahavand County
- Hoseynabad Gian, a village in Nahavand County
- Hoseynabad, Khezel, a village in Nahavand County

== Hormozgan Province ==
- Hoseynabad, Bandar Abbas, a village in Bandar Abbas County
- Hoseynabad, Bastak, a village in Bastak County
- Hoseynabad, Hajjiabad, a village in Hajjiabad County
- Hoseynabad, Parsian, a village in Parsian County

== Ilam Province ==
- Hoseynabad, Ilam, a village in Ilam County

== Isfahan Province ==
- Hoseynabad, Kavirat, a village in Aran va Bidgol County
- Hoseynabad, Ardestan, a village in Ardestan County
- Hoseynabad, Zavareh, a village in Ardestan County
- Hoseynabad, Buin va Miandasht, a village in Buin va Miandasht County
- Hoseynabad, Chadegan, a village in Chadegan County
- Hoseynabad, Falavarjan, a village in Falavarjan County
- Hoseynabad, Baraan-e Shomali, a village in Isfahan County
- Hoseynabad, Qahab-e Shomali, a village in Isfahan County
- Hoseynabad, Jarqavieh Olya, a village in Isfahan County
- Hoseynabad, Jarqavieh Sofla, a village in Isfahan County
- Hoseynabad-e Qohab, a village in Isfahan County
- Hoseynabad, Kashan, a village in Kashan County
- Hoseynabad, Khur and Biabanak, a village in Khur and Biabanak County
- Hoseynabad-e Asheq, a village in Nain County
- Hoseynabad-e Hajj Kazem, a village in Nain County
- Hoseynabad, Najafabad, a village in Najafabad County
- Hoseynabad, Natanz, a village in Natanz County
- Hoseynabad, Semirom, a village in Semirom County
- Hoseynabad, Shahreza, a village in Shahreza County
- Hoseynabad, Tiran and Karvan, a village in Tiran and Karvan County
- Hoseynabad, Rezvaniyeh, a village in Tiran and Karvan County
- Hoseynabad Rural District (Isfahan Province), in Najafabad County

== Kerman Province ==
=== Anar County ===
- Hoseynabad, Anar, a city in Anar County
- Hoseynabad Rural District (Anar County)

=== Anbarabad County ===
- Hoseynabad, Anbarabad, a village in Anbarabad County
- Hoseynabad-e Dehdar, a village in Anbarabad County
- Hoseynabad-e Harandi, a village in Anbarabad County
- Hoseynabad-e Jadid, Anbarabad, a village in Anbarabad County
- Hoseynabad-e Luli, a village in Anbarabad County
- Hoseynabad-e Mazafari, a village in Anbarabad County
- Hoseynabad-e Olya, Anbarabad, a village in Anbarabad County
- Hoseynabad-e Zinabad, a village in Anbarabad County
- Hoseynabad Rural District (Anbarabad County)

=== Arzuiyeh County ===
- Hoseynabad, Arzuiyeh, a village in Arzuiyeh County
- Hoseynabad, Vakilabad, a village in Arzuiyeh County
- Hoseynabad-e Khani, Arzuiyeh, a village in Arzuiyeh County
- Hoseynabad-e Yek, Arzuiyeh, a village in Arzuiyeh County

=== Baft County ===
- Hoseynabad, Baft, a village in Baft County

=== Bardsir County ===
- Hoseynabad-e Mahunak, a village in Bardsir County

=== Fahraj County ===
- Hoseynabad-e Alam Khan, a village in Fahraj County
- Hoseynabad-e Khoda Bandeh, a village in Fahraj County
- Hoseynabad-e Molla Amir, a village in Fahraj County
- Hoseynabad-e Sar Jangal, a village in Fahraj County
- Hoseynabad-e Vakil, a village in Fahraj County
- Hoseynabad-e Vali Mohammad, a village in Fahraj County

=== Faryab County ===
- Hoseynabad-e Hormeh, a village in Faryab County
- Hoseynabad-e Sargel, a village in Faryab County
- Hoseynabad-e Sargorij, a village in Faryab County

=== Jiroft County ===
- Hoseynabad, Esfandaqeh, a village in Jiroft County
- Hoseynabad, Halil, a village in Jiroft County
- Hoseynabad, Saghder, a village in Jiroft County
- Hoseynabad-e Do, Jiroft, a village in Jiroft County
- Hoseynabad-e Zirki, a village in Jiroft County

=== Kahnuj County ===
- Hoseynabad, Kahnuj, a village in Kahnuj County

=== Kerman County ===
- Hoseynabad-e Akhund, Kerman, a village in Kerman County
- Hoseynabad-e Do, Chatrud, a village in Kerman County
- Hoseynabad-e Khan, Sar Asiab-e Farsangi, a village in Kerman County
- Hoseynabad-e Goruh Rural District, an administrative subdivision of Kerman County

=== Kuhbanan County ===
- Hoseynabad 4, a village in Kuhbanan County

=== Manujan County ===
- Hoseynabad, Manujan, a village in Manujan County

=== Narmashir County ===
- Hoseynabad-e Derakhti, a village in Narmashir County
- Hoseynabad-e Khan, Narmashir, a village in Narmashir County
- Hoseynabad-e Posht-e Rud, a village in Narmashir County

=== Qaleh Ganj County ===
- Hoseynabad, Qaleh Ganj, a village in Qaleh Ganj County

=== Ravar County ===
- Hoseynabad-e Dam Dahaneh, a village in Ravar County

=== Rafsanjan County ===
- Hoseynabad, Azadegan, a village in Rafsanjan County
- Hoseynabad, Darreh Doran, a village in Rafsanjan County
- Hoseynabad, Eslamiyeh, a village in Rafsanjan County
- Hoseynabad, Ferdows, Rafsanjan, a village in Rafsanjan County
- Hoseynabad, Koshkuiyeh, a village in Rafsanjan County
- Hoseynabad, Nuq, a village in Rafsanjan County
- Hoseynabad, Qasemabad, a village in Rafsanjan County
- Hoseynabad-e Eslami, Rafsanjan, a village in Rafsanjan County

=== Rigan County ===
- Hoseynabad-e Ab Shur, a village in Rigan County
- Hoseynabad-e Latabad, a village in Rigan County
- Hoseynabad-e Rud Shur, a village in Rigan County
- Hoseynabad-e Sarhang, a village in Rigan County

=== Rudbar-e Jonubi County ===
- Hoseynabad-e Morad Khan, a village in Rudbar-e Jonubi County
- Hoseynabad-e Zeh Kalut, a village in Rudbar-e Jonubi County

=== Shahr-e Babak County ===
- Hoseynabad, Dehaj, a village in Shahr-e Babak County
- Hoseynabad, Estabraq, a village in Shahr-e Babak County
- Hoseynabad, Khatunabad, a village in Shahr-e Babak County
- Hoseynabad-e Madvar, a village in Shahr-e Babak County
- Hoseynabad-e Robat, a village in Shahr-e Babak County
- Hoseynabad-e Rumani, a village in Shahr-e Babak County

=== Sirjan County ===
- Hoseynabad, Mahmudabad-e Seyyed, a village in Sirjan County
- Hoseynabad, Pariz, a village in Sirjan County
- Hoseynabad-e Fazeli, a village in Sirjan County
- Hoseynabad-e Khani, Sirjan, a village in Sirjan County

=== Zarand County ===
- Hoseynabad, Zarand, a village in Zarand County
- Hoseynabad-e Akhund, Zarand, a village in Zarand County
- Hoseynabad-e Jadid, Zarand, a village in Zarand County
- Hoseynabad-e Jahangirkhan, a village in Zarand County
- Hoseynabad-e Rahatabad, a village in Zarand County

== Kermanshah Province ==
- Hoseynabad, Harsin, a village in Harsin County
- Hoseynabad, Kangavar, a village in Kangavar County
- Hoseynabad, Baladarband, a village in Kermanshah County
- Hoseynabad, Kuzaran, a village in Kermanshah County
- Hoseynabad, Mahidasht, a village in Kermanshah County
- Hoseynabad-e Ruintan, a village in Kermanshah County
- Hoseynabad, Ravansar, a village in Ravansar County
- Hoseynabad, Hojr, a village in Sahneh County
- Hoseynabad, Khodabandehlu, a village in Sahneh County
- Hoseynabad-e Amjadi, a village in Sonqor County
- Hoseynabad-e Deh Boneh, a village in Sonqor County
- Hoseynabad-e Quri Chay, a village in Sonqor County

== Khuzestan Province ==
- Hoseynabad (32°10′ N 49°21′ E), Andika, a village in Andika County
- Hoseynabad, Andimeshk, a village in Andimeshk County
- Hoseynabad, Behbahan, a village in Behbahan County
- Hoseynabad-e Sheykh, a village in Behbahan County
- Hoseynabad-e Soltani, a village in Behbahan County
- Hoseynabad, Hendijan, a village in Hendijan County
- Hoseynabad, Masjed Soleyman, a village in Masjed Soleyman County
- Hoseynabad Rural District (Khuzestan Province), in Shush County

== Kohgiluyeh and Boyer-Ahmad Province ==
- Hoseynabad-e Mokhtar, a village in Boyer-Ahmad County
- Hoseynabad-e Olya, Kohgiluyeh and Boyer-Ahmad, a village in Boyer-Ahmad County
- Hoseynabad-e Sofla, Kohgiluyeh and Boyer-Ahmad, a village in Boyer-Ahmad County
- Hoseynabad-e Rowshanabad, a village in Kohgiluyeh County

== Kurdistan Province ==
- Hoseynabad, Bijar, a village in Bijar County
- Hoseynabad-e Demirchi, a village in Bijar County
- Hoseynabad-e Gorgan, a village in Bijar County
- Hoseynabad-e Kamarzard, a village in Bijar County
- Hoseynabad, Dehgolan, a village in Dehgolan County
- Hoseynabad, Divandarreh, a village in Divandarreh County
- Hoseynabad-e Shomali Rural District, in Divandarreh County
- Hoseynabad-e Kangareh, a village in Qorveh County
- Hoseynabad-e Zelleh Jub, a village in Qorveh County
- Hoseynabad, Sanandaj, a village in Sanandaj County
- Hoseynabad-e Jonubi Rural District, in Sanandaj County
- Hoseynabad, Sarvabad, a village in Sarvabad County
- Hoseynabad, Zherizhah, a village in Sarvabad County

== Lorestan Province ==
- Hoseynabad, Delfan, a village in the Central District of Delfan County
- Hoseynabad, Kakavand, a village in Kakavand District, Delfan County
- Hoseynabad Bey Baba, a village in the Central District of Delfan County
- Hoseynabad-e Olya, Lorestan, a village in Delfan County
- Hoseynabad, Dorud, a village in the Central District of Dorud County
- Hoseynabad Shahivand, a village in Dowreh County
- Hoseynabad, Khorramabad, a village in Khorramabad County
- Hoseynabad, Rumeshkhan, a village in Rumeshkhan County
- Hoseynabad, Doab, a village in Selseleh County
- Hoseynabad, Honam, a village in Selseleh County
- Hoseynabad, Qaleh-ye Mozaffari, a village in Selseleh County
- Hoseynabad-e Amiri, Lorestan, a village in Selseleh County
- Hoseynabad-e Hendi Olya, a village in Selseleh County
- Hoseynabad-e Khayyat, a village in Selseleh County

== Markazi Province ==
- Hoseynabad, Arak, a village in Arak County
- Hoseynabad, Farahan, a village in Farahan County
- Hoseynabad, Khomeyn, a village in Khomeyn County
- Hoseynabad-e Sadat, a village in Khomeyn County
- Hoseynabad-e Muqufeh, a village in Khondab County
- Hoseynabad, Komijan, a village in Komijan County
- Hoseynabad, Saveh, a village in Saveh County
- Hoseynabad, Shazand, a village in Shazand County
- Hoseynabad, Sarband, a village in Shazand County
- Hoseynabad, Zalian, a village in Shazand County
- Hoseynabad, Zarandieh, a village in Zarandieh County

== Mazandaran Province ==
- Hoseynabad, Harazpey-ye Jonubi, a village in Amol County
- Hoseynabad, Pain Khiyaban-e Litkuh, a village in Amol County
- Hoseynabad, Dabudasht, a village in Amol County
- Hoseynabad, Behshahr, a village in Behshahr County
- Hoseynabad-e Olya, Mazandaran, a village in Chalus County
- Hoseynabad-e Sofla, Mazandaran, a village in Chalus County
- Hoseynabad, Fereydunkenar, a village in Fereydunkenar County
- Hoseynabad, Estakhr-e Posht, a village in Neka County
- Hoseynabad, Zarem Rud, a village in Neka County
- Hoseynabad, Nur, a village in Nur County
- Hoseynabad, Sari, a village in Sari County
- Hoseynabad, Tonekabon, a village in Tonekabon County

== North Khorasan Province ==
- Hoseynabad, North Khorasan, a village in Shirvan County
- Hoseynabad-e Khankowr, a village in Esfarayen County
- Hoseynabad-e Kordha, North Khorasan, a village in Esfarayen County

== Qazvin Province ==
- Hoseynabad, Abyek, a village in Abyek County
- Hoseynabad-e Kord, a village in Abyek County
- Hoseynabad, Buin Zahra, a village in Buin Zahra County
- Hoseynabad-e Beglar Beygi, a village in Buin Zahra County
- Hoseynabad-e Amini, a village in Buin Zahra County
- Hoseynabad-e Shah Nazar, a village in Buin Zahra County
- Hoseynabad-e Eqbal, a village in Qazvin County
- Hoseynabad, Kuhin, a village in Qazvin County
- Hoseynabad, Tarom Sofla, a village in Qazvin County
- Hoseynabad, Takestan, a village in Takestan County
- Hoseynabad-e Jarandaq, a village in Takestan County

== Qom Province ==
- Hoseynabad, Qom
- Hoseynabad-e Mish Mast
- Hoseynabad-e Zand

== Razavi Khorasan Province ==
=== Bajestan County ===
- Hoseynabad, Bajestan, a village in Bajestan County

=== Bakharz County ===
- Hoseynabad-e Taqi, a village in Bakharz County

=== Bardaskan County ===
- Hoseynabad, Bardaskan, a village in Bardaskan County
- Hoseynabad-e Mahlar-e Olya, a village in Bardaskan County
- Hoseynabad-e Mahlar-e Sofla, a village in Bardaskan County

=== Chenaran County ===
- Hoseynabad, Chenaran, a village in Chenaran County
- Hoseynabad, Golbahar, a village in Golbahar County

=== Dargaz County ===
- Hoseynabad, Dargaz, a village in Dargaz County
- Hoseynabad-e Sedaqat, a village in Dargaz County

=== Davarzan County ===
- Hoseynabad, Davarzan, a village in Davarzan County

=== Fariman County ===
- Hoseynabad-e Qaleh Sorkh, a village in Fariman County
- Hoseynabad-e Rekhneh Gol, a village in Fariman County

=== Firuzeh County ===
- Hoseynabad-e Kamal al Malek, a village in Firuzeh County

=== Gonabad County ===
- Hoseynabad (Khunabad), a village in Gonabad County

=== Joghatai County ===
- Hoseynabad, Joghatai, a village in Joghatai County

=== Jowayin County ===
- Hoseynabad-e Mirza Momen, a village in Jowayin County

=== Khalilabad County ===
- Hoseynabad, Khalilabad, a village in Khalilabad County

=== Khoshab County ===
- Hoseynabad, Khoshab, a village in Khoshab County

=== Khvaf County ===
- Hoseynabad, Khvaf, a village in Khvaf County
- Hoseynabad, Salami, a village in Khvaf County

=== Mashhad County ===
- Hoseynabad, Ahmadabad, a village in Mashhad County
- Hoseynabad, Razaviyeh, a village in Mashhad County
- Hoseynabad-e Gazband, a village in Mashhad County
- Hoseynabad-e Gusheh, a village in Mashhad County
- Hoseynabad-e Qorqi, a village in Mashhad County

=== Nishapur County ===
- Hoseynabad, Miyan Jolgeh, a village in Nishapur County
- Hoseynabad, Zeberkhan, a village in Nishapur County
- Hoseynabad-e Arab, a village in Nishapur County
- Hoseynabad-e Chaghuki, a village in Nishapur County
- Hoseynabad-e Jadid, Razavi Khorasan, a village in Nishapur County
- Hoseynabad-e Jangal, Razavi Khorasan, a village in Nishapur County
- Hoseynabad-e Makhtari, a village in Nishapur County
- Hoseynabad-e Nazer, a village in Nishapur County

=== Rashtkhvar County ===
- Hoseynabad-e Rashtkhvar, a village in Rashtkhvar County

=== Sabzevar County ===
- Hoseynabad, Beyhaq, a village in Sabzevar County
- Hoseynabad, Shamkan, a village in Sabzevar County
- Hoseynabad-e Ganji, a village in Sabzevar County

=== Torbat-e Jam County ===
- Hoseynabad, Torbat-e Jam, a village in Torbat-e Jam County
- Hoseynabad-e Aqa Beyk, a village in Torbat-e Jam County
- Hoseynabad-e Kalali, a village in Torbat-e Jam County

=== Zaveh County ===
- Hoseynabad, Zaveh, a village in Zaveh County

== Semnan Province ==
- Hoseynabad-e Dula, a village in Damghan County
- Hoseynabad-e Hajji Ali Naqi, a village in Damghan County
- Hoseynabad-e Kordeh, a village in Garmsar County
- Hoseynabad-e Koru, a village in Garmsar County
- Hoseynabad, Kalat-e Hay-ye Sharqi, a village in Meyami County
- Hoseynabad-e Kalpu, a village in Meyami County
- Hoseynabad Pol-e Abrish, a village in Meyami County
- Hoseynabad-e Saghar, a village in Shahrud County
- Hoseynabad-e Zandeh, a village in Shahrud County

== Sistan and Baluchestan Province ==
- Hoseynabad, Bampur, a village in Bampur County
- Hoseynabad, Dalgan, a village in Dalgan County
- Hoseynabad-e Bagh-e Nil, a village in Dalgan County
- Hoseynabad-e Gaz Shahan, a village in Dalgan County
- Hoseynabad Ladi, a village in Dalgan County
- Shahrak-e Hoseynabad, a village in Dalgan County
- Hoseynabad, Hirmand, a village in Hirmand County
- Hoseynabad, Gowhar Kuh, a village in Khash County
- Hoseynabad-e Nilgun, a village in Khash County

== South Khorasan Province ==
=== Birjand County ===
- Hoseynabad, Birjand, a village in Birjand County
- Hoseynabad-e Ali Mohammad, a village in Birjand County

=== Boshruyeh County ===
- Hoseynabad, Ali Jamal, a village in Boshruyeh County
- Hoseynabad, Kerend, a village in Boshruyeh County

=== Ferdows County ===
- Hoseynabad, Ferdows, a village in Ferdows County

=== Khusf County ===
- Hoseynabad, Khusf, a village in Khusf County
- Hoseynabad-e Miran, a village in Khusf County
- Hoseynabad-e Sheybani, South Khorasan, a village in Khusf County

=== Nehbandan County ===
- Hoseynabad, Nehbandan, a village in Nehbandan County
- Hoseynabad (Korq-e Sang), a village in Nehbandan County
- Hoseynabad-e Abaleh, a village in Nehbandan County
- Hoseynabad-e Arabkhaneh, a village in Nehbandan County
- Hoseynabad-e Qasem, a village in Nehbandan County
- Hoseynabad-e Sar Kal, a village in Nehbandan County

=== Sarbisheh County ===
- Hoseynabad-e Gavahi, a village in Sarbisheh County
- Hoseynabad-e Ghinab, a village in Sarbisheh County
- Hoseynabad-e Sarzeh, a village in Sarbisheh County
- Hoseynabad-e Zeydar, a village in Sarbisheh County

=== Tabas County ===
- Hoseynabad, Tabas, a village in Tabas County

=== Zirkuh County ===
- Hoseynabad, Afin, a village in Zirkuh County
- Hoseynabad, Zirkuh, a village in Zirkuh County
- Hoseynabad, Zohan, a village in Zirkuh County
- Hoseynabad-e Pain, South Khorasan, a village in Zirkuh County

== Tehran Province ==
- Hoseynabad, Damavand, a village in Damavand County
- Hoseynabad, Rey, a village in Rey County
- Hoseynabad-e Alizadeh, a village in Malard County
- Hoseynabad-e Hafashlu, a village in Malard County
- Hoseynabad-e Javaheri, a village in Varamin County
- Hoseynabad-e Kashani, a village in Varamin County
- Hoseynabad-e Qajar, a village in Pakdasht County
- Hoseynabad-e Qashqai, a village in Varamin County
- Hoseynabad-e Siahab, a village in Eslamshahr County
- Hoseynabad-e Yangejeh, a village in Robat Karim County

== West Azerbaijan Province ==
- Hoseynabad, Bukan, a village in Bukan County
- Hoseynabad, Chaypareh, a village in Chaypareh County
- Hoseynabad, Bastam, a village in Chaypareh County
- Hoseynabad-e Marakan, a village in Khoy County
- Hoseynabad, Miandoab, a village in Miandoab County
- Hoseynabad, Mahmudabad, a village in Shahin Dezh County
- Hoseynabad, Safa Khaneh, a village in Shahin Dezh County

== Yazd Province ==
=== Abarkuh County ===
- Hoseynabad (31°05′ N 53°20′ E), Abarkuh, a village in Abarkuh County

=== Ardakan County ===
- Hoseynabad, Ardakan, a village in Ardakan County

=== Bafq County ===
- Hoseynabad, Bafq, a village in Bafq County

=== Behabad County ===
- Hoseynabad, Asfyj, a village in Behabad County
- Hoseynabad Sar Kazeh, a village in Behabad County

=== Khatam County ===
- Hoseynabad, Khatam, a village in Khatam County
- Hoseynabad, Marvast, a village in Khatam County

=== Mehriz County ===
- Hoseynabad, Mehriz, a village in Mehriz County
- 'oseynabad-e Kukok, alternate name of Kukok, a village in Mehriz County

=== Saduq County ===
- Hoseynabad, Saduq, a village in Saduq County
- Hoseynabad-e Pur Akbari, a village in Saduq County

=== Taft County ===
- Hoseynabad, Aliabad, Taft, a village in Taft County
- Hoseynabad, Sakhvid, a village in Taft County
- Hoseynabad, Shirkuh, a village in Taft County
- Hoseynabad-e Kalagushi, a village in Taft County
- Hoseynabad-e Navvab, a village in Taft County
- Hoseynabad-e Pashmi, a village in Taft County
- Hoseynabad-e Shafi Pur, a village in Taft County
- Hoseynabad-e Shurabeh, a village in Taft County

=== Yazd County ===
- Hoseynabad, Yazd, a village in Yazd County
- Hoseynabad-e Rismani, a village in Yazd County

== Zanjan Province ==
- Hoseynabad, Abhar, a village in Abhar County
- Hoseynabad-e Qarqalu, a village in Abhar County
- Hoseynabad, Khodabandeh, a village in Khodabandeh County
- Hoseynabad, Zanjan, a village in Zanjan County
- Hoseynabad, Zanjanrud, a village in Zanjan County

== See also ==
- Hasanabad (disambiguation)
- Hosenabad (disambiguation)
- Hussainabad (disambiguation)
- Hoseynabad-e Akhund (disambiguation)
- Hoseynabad-e Bala (disambiguation)
- Hoseynabad-e Do (disambiguation)
- Hoseynabad-e Jadid (disambiguation)
- Hoseynabad-e Khan (disambiguation)
- Hoseynabad-e Olya (disambiguation)
- Hoseynabad-e Pain (disambiguation)
- Hoseynabad-e Sofla (disambiguation)
- Hoseynabad Rural District (disambiguation)
- Hüseynabad
