= Hoseynabad-e Do =

Hoseynabad-e Do (Persian: حسين اباد2) may refer to:

- Hoseynabad-e Do, Jiroft
- Hoseynabad-e Do, Chatrud, Kerman County
- Hoseynabad-e Do, Sirjan
