= Hoseynabad-e Akhund =

Hoseynabad-e Akhund or Hoseynabad Akhvond (Persian: حسين اباداخوند) may refer to:

- Hoseynabad-e Akhund, Kerman
- Hoseynabad-e Akhund, Zarand, Kerman Province
