= Hoseynabad-e Olya =

Hoseynabad-e Olya (Persian: حسين ابادعليا) may refer to:

- Hoseynabad-e Olya, Anbarabad, Kerman Province
- Hoseynabad-e Olya, Rafsanjan, Kerman Province
- Hoseynabad-e Olya, Kohgiluyeh and Boyer-Ahmad
- Hoseynabad-e Olya, Lorestan
- Hoseynabad-e Olya, Mazandaran
