= Hoseynabad-e Khan =

Hoseynabad-e Khan or Hoseynabad Khan or Hosein Abad Khan (Persian: حسين ابادخان) may refer to various places in Iran:

- Hoseynabad-e Khan, Kuhestan, Isfahan Province
- Hoseynabad-e Khan, Ekhtiarabad, Kerman County, Kerman Province
- Hoseynabad-e Khan, Sar Asiab-e Farsangi, Kerman County, Kerman Province
- Hoseynabad-e Khan, alternate name for Hoseynabad-e Akhund, Kerman, Kerman County, Kerman Province
- Hoseynabad-e Khan, Narmashir, Kerman Province
