= Hoseynabad, Kuhrang =

Hoseynabad حسين اباد
- Village
- Location within Iran
- Coordinates: 32°11′39″N 50°03′43″E
- Country: Iran
- Province: Chaharmahal and Bakhtiari
- County: Kuhrang
- Bakhsh: Bazoft
- Rural District: Bazoft

Population (2006)
  - Total: 228
- Time zone: UTC+3:30 (IRST)
  - Summer (DST): UTC+4:30 (IRDT)

Hoseynabad (Persian: حسين اباد, also Romanized as Ḩoseynābād; also known as Margh-e Shāh and Marghshāh) is a village in Bazoft Rural District, Bazoft District, Kuhrang County, Chaharmahal and Bakhtiari Province, Iran. At the 2006 census, its population was 228, in 35 families. The village is populated by Lurs.
