= Hoseynabad, Mehriz =

Hoseynabad حسين اباد
- Village
- Location within Iran
- Coordinates: 31°33′29″N 54°27′21″E
- Country: Iran
- Province: Yazd
- County: Mehriz
- Bakhsh: Central
- Rural District: Khvormiz

Population (2006)
  - Total: 237
- Time zone: UTC+3:30 (IRST)
  - Summer (DST): UTC+4:30 (IRDT)

Hoseynabad (Persian: حسين اباد, also Romanized as Ḩoseynābād) is a village in Khvormiz Rural District, in the Central District of Mehriz County, Yazd Province, Iran. At the 2006 census, its population was 237, in 59 families.
