= Hoseynabad-e Bala =

Hoseynabad-e Bala (Persian: حسين ابادبالا) may refer to:

- Hoseynabad-e Bala, Anbarabad, Kerman Province
- Hoseynabad-e Bala, Rafsanjan, Kerman Province
