= Khunabad =

Khunabad خون اباد
- Village
- Location within Iran
- Coordinates: 34°07′44″N 58°45′35″E
- Country: Iran
- Province: Razavi Khorasan
- County: Gonabad
- Bakhsh: Kakhk
- Rural District: Kakhk

Population (2006)
  - Total: 59
- Time zone: UTC+3:30 (IRST)
  - Summer (DST): UTC+4:30 (IRDT)

Khunabad (Persian: خون اباد, also Romanized as Khūnābād; also known as Ḩoseynābād) is a village in Kakhk Rural District, Kakhk District, Gonabad County, Razavi Khorasan Province, Iran. At the 2006 census, its population was 59, in 22 families.
