= Hoseynabad-e Barkeh Puz =

Hoseynabad-e Barkeh Puz حسين ابادبركه پوز
- Village
- Location within Iran
- Coordinates: 27°26′04″N 54°10′20″E
- Country: Iran
- Province: Fars
- County: Larestan
- Bakhsh: Sahray-ye Bagh
- Rural District: Sahray-ye Bagh

Population (2006)
  - Total: 152
- Time zone: UTC+3:30 (IRST)
  - Summer (DST): UTC+4:30 (IRDT)

Hoseynabad-e Barkeh Puz (Persian: حسين ابادبركه پوز, also Romanized as Ḩoseynābād-e Barkeh Pūz; also known as Barkeh Pūzeh) is a village in Sahray-ye Bagh Rural District, Sahray-ye Bagh District, Larestan County, Fars province, Iran. At the 2006 census, its population was 152, in 36 families.
