= Hoseynabad, Baladarband =

Hoseynabad حسين اباد
- Village
- Location within Iran
- Coordinates: 34°24′58″N 47°00′22″E
- Country: Iran
- Province: Kermanshah
- County: Kermanshah
- Bakhsh: Central
- Rural District: Baladarband

Population (2006)
  - Total: 241
- Time zone: UTC+3:30 (IRST)
  - Summer (DST): UTC+4:30 (IRDT)

Hoseynabad (Persian: حسين اباد, also Romanized as Ḩoseynābād) is a village in Baladarband Rural District, in the Central District of Kermanshah County, Kermanshah Province, Iran. At the 2006 census, its population was 241, in 53 families.
