= Hoseynabad, Bampur =

Hoseynabad حسين اباد
- Village
- Location within Iran
- Coordinates: 27°10′25″N 60°27′35″E
- Country: Iran
- Province: Sistan and Baluchestan
- County: Bampur
- Bakhsh: Central
- Rural District: Bampur-e Sharqi

Population (2006)
  - Total: 1,166
- Time zone: UTC+3:30 (IRST)
  - Summer (DST): UTC+4:30 (IRDT)

Hoseynabad (Persian: حسين اباد, also Romanized as Ḩoseynābād; also known as Hosein Abad) is a village in Bampur-e Sharqi Rural District, in the Central District of Bampur County, Sistan and Baluchestan Province, Iran. At the 2006 census, its population was 1,166, in 211 families.
