= Hoseynabad-e Morad Khan =

Hoseynabad-e Morad Khan حسين ابادمرادخان
- Village
- Location within Iran
- Coordinates: 27°50′05″N 58°00′33″E
- Country: Iran
- Province: Kerman
- County: Rudbar-e Jonubi
- Bakhsh: Central
- Rural District: Nehzatabad

Population (2006)
  - Total: 76
- Time zone: UTC+3:30 (IRST)
  - Summer (DST): UTC+4:30 (IRDT)

Hoseynabad-e Morad Khan (Persian: حسين ابادمرادخان, also Romanized as Ḩoseynābād-e Morād Khān; also known as Ḩoseynābād and Ḩoseynābād-e Morād ‘Alī Khān) is a village in Nehzatabad Rural District, in the Central District of Rudbar-e Jonubi County, Kerman Province, Iran. At the 2006 census, its population was 76, in 13 families.
