= Hoseynabad-e Sargel =

Hoseynabad-e Sargel حسين ابادسرگل
- Village
- Location within Iran
- Coordinates: 28°08′08″N 57°16′56″E
- Country: Iran
- Province: Kerman
- County: Faryab
- Bakhsh: Central
- Rural District: Golashkerd

Population (2006)
  - Total: 220
- Time zone: UTC+3:30 (IRST)
  - Summer (DST): UTC+4:30 (IRDT)

Hoseynabad-e Sargel (Persian: حسين ابادسرگل, also Romanized as Ḩoseynābād-e Sargel; also known as Ḩoseynābād-e Sohrābī) is a village in Golashkerd Rural District, in the Central District of Faryab County, Kerman Province, Iran. At the 2006 census, its population was 220, in 41 families.
