= Hoseynabad-e Gaz Shahan =

Hoseynabad-e Gaz Shahan حسين آباد گزشاهان
- Village
- Location within Iran
- Coordinates: 27°28′21″N 59°27′13″E
- Country: Iran
- Province: Sistan and Baluchestan
- County: Dalgan
- Bakhsh: Central
- Rural District: Dalgan

Population (2006)
  - Total: 72
- Time zone: UTC+3:30 (IRST)
  - Summer (DST): UTC+4:30 (IRDT)

Hoseynabad-e Gaz Shahan (Persian: حسين آباد گزشاهان, also Romanized as Ḩoseynābād-e Gaz Shāhān; also known as Ḩoseynābād) is a village in Dalgan Rural District, in the Central District of Dalgan County, Sistan and Baluchestan Province, Iran. At the 2006 census, its population was 72, in 14 families.
