= Hoseynabad-e Navvab =

Hoseynabad-e Navvab حسين ابادنواب
- Village
- Location within Iran
- Coordinates: 31°41′09″N 53°59′48″E
- Country: Iran
- Province: Yazd
- County: Taft
- Bakhsh: Central
- Rural District: Pishkuh

Population (2006)
  - Total: 43
- Time zone: UTC+3:30 (IRST)
  - Summer (DST): UTC+4:30 (IRDT)

Hoseynabad-e Navvab (Persian: حسين ابادنواب, also Romanized as Ḩoseynābād-e Navvāb) is a village in Pishkuh Rural District, in the Central District of Taft County, Yazd Province, Iran. At the 2006 census, its population was 43, in 12 families.
