= Hoseynabad-e Dartang =

Hoseynabad-e Dartang حسين اباددرتنگ
- Village
- Location within Iran
- Coordinates: 34°33′23″N 47°24′43″E
- Country: Iran
- Province: Kermanshah
- County: Harsin
- Bakhsh: Bisotun
- Rural District: Cham Chamal

Population (2006)
  - Total: 30
- Time zone: UTC+3:30 (IRST)
  - Summer (DST): UTC+4:30 (IRDT)

Hoseynabad-e Dartang (Persian: حسين اباددرتنگ, also Romanized as Ḩoseynābād-e Dartang; also known as Ḩoseynābād) is a village in Cham Chamal Rural District, Bisotun District, Harsin County, Kermanshah Province, Iran. At the 2006 census, its population was 30, in 10 families.
