= Hoseynabad-e Beglar Beygi =

Hoseynabad-e Beglar Beygi حسين ابادبيگلربيگي
- Village
- Location within Iran
- Coordinates: 35°59′25″N 49°48′50″E
- Country: Iran
- Province: Qazvin
- County: Buin Zahra
- Bakhsh: Dashtabi
- Rural District: Dashtabi-ye Gharbi

Population (2006)
  - Total: 86
- Time zone: UTC+3:30 (IRST)
  - Summer (DST): UTC+4:30 (IRDT)

Hoseynabad-e Beglar Beygi (Persian: حسين ابادبيگلربيگي, also Romanized as Ḩoseynābād-e Beglar Beygī and Ḩoseynābād-e Bīglarbeygī) is a village in Dashtabi-ye Gharbi Rural District, Dashtabi District, Buin Zahra County, Qazvin Province, Iran. At the 2006 census, its population was 86, in 23 families.
