= Hoseynabad, Bastak =

Hoseynabad حسين آباد
- Village
- Location within Iran
- Coordinates: 27°26′04″N 54°10′21″E
- Country: Iran
- Province: Hormozgan
- County: Bastak
- Bakhsh: Central
- Rural District: Fatuyeh

Population (2006)
  - Total: 97
- Time zone: UTC+3:30 (IRST)
  - Summer (DST): UTC+4:30 (IRDT)

Hoseynabad (Persian: حسين آباد, also Romanized as Ḩoseynābād) is a village in Fatuyeh Rural District, in the Central District of Bastak County, Hormozgan Province, Iran. At the 2006 census, its population was 97, in 20 families.
