= Hoseynabad-e Hendi Olya =

Hoseynabad-e Hendi Olya حسين ابادهندي عليا
- Village
- Country: Iran
- Province: Lorestan
- County: Selseleh
- Bakhsh: Central
- Rural District: Yusefvand

Population (2006)
  - Total: 14
- Time zone: UTC+3:30 (IRST)
  - Summer (DST): UTC+4:30 (IRDT)

Hoseynabad-e Hendi Olya (Persian: حسين ابادهندي عليا, also Romanized as Ḩoseynābād-e Hendī ‘Olyā) is a village in Yusefvand Rural District, in the Central District of Selseleh County, Lorestan Province, Iran. At the 2006 census, its population was 14, in 4 families.
