= Hoseynabad-e Demirchi =

Hoseynabad-e Demirchi حسین‌آباد دمیرچی
- Village
- Location within Iran
- Coordinates: 36°09′37″N 47°46′33″E
- Country: Iran
- Province: Kurdistan
- County: Bijar
- Bakhsh: Central
- Rural District: Seylatan

Population (2006)
  - Total: 52
- Time zone: UTC+3:30 (IRST)
  - Summer (DST): UTC+4:30 (IRDT)

Hoseynabad-e Demirchi (Persian: حسین‌آباد دمیرچی, also Romanized as Ḩoseynābād-e Demīrchī; also known as Ḩoseynābād-e Mīrchī) is a villages in Seylatan Rural District, in the Central District of Bijar County, Kurdistan province, Iran. At the 2006 census, its population was 52, in 13 families. The village is populated by Azerbaijanis.
