= Hoseynabad-e Dam Dahaneh =

Hoseynabad-e Dam Dahaneh حسين اباددم دهنه
- Village
- Location within Iran
- Coordinates: 30°38′42″N 56°58′08″E
- Country: Iran
- Province: Kerman
- County: Ravar
- Bakhsh: Kuhsaran
- Rural District: Heruz

Population (2006)
  - Total: 26
- Time zone: UTC+3:30 (IRST)
  - Summer (DST): UTC+4:30 (IRDT)

Hoseynabad-e Dam Dahaneh (Persian: حسين اباددم دهنه, also Romanized as Ḩoseynābād-e Dam Dahaneh; also known as Ḩoseynābād and Ḩoseynābād-e Dahaneh) is a village in Heruz Rural District, Kuhsaran District, Ravar County, Kerman Province, Iran. At the 2006 census, its population was 26, in 9 families.
