= Hoseynabad-e Rowshanabad =

Hoseynabad-e Rowshanabad حسين اباد روشن اباد
- Village
- Location within Iran
- Coordinates: 30°43′21″N 50°30′30″E
- Country: Iran
- Province: Kohgiluyeh and Boyer-Ahmad
- County: Kohgiluyeh
- Bakhsh: Central
- Rural District: Dehdasht-e Gharbi

Population (2006)
  - Total: 84
- Time zone: UTC+3:30 (IRST)
  - Summer (DST): UTC+4:30 (IRDT)

Hoseynabad-e Rowshanabad (Persian: حسين اباد روشن اباد, also Romanized as Ḩoseynābād-e Rowshanābād; also known as Ḩoseynābād) is a village in Dehdasht-e Gharbi Rural District, in the Central District of Kohgiluyeh County, Kohgiluyeh and Boyer-Ahmad Province, Iran. At the 2006 census, its population was 84, in 12 families.
