= Hoseynabad-e Kalagushi =

Hoseynabad-e Kalagushi حسين ابادكلاگوشي
- Village
- Location within Iran
- Coordinates: 31°35′32″N 53°43′18″E
- Country: Iran
- Province: Yazd
- County: Taft
- Bakhsh: Central
- Rural District: Dehshir

Population (2006)
  - Total: 23
- Time zone: UTC+3:30 (IRST)
  - Summer (DST): UTC+4:30 (IRDT)

Hoseynabad-e Kalagushi (Persian: حسين ابادكلاگوشي, also Romanized as Ḩoseynābād-e Kalāgūshī; also known as Ḩoseynābād) is a village in Dehshir Rural District, in the Central District of Taft County, Yazd Province, Iran. At the 2006 census, its population was 23, divided into 8 families.
