= Hoseynabad-e Sofla, Kohgiluyeh and Boyer-Ahmad =

Hoseynabad-e Sofla حسين ابادسفلي
- Village
- Location within Iran
- Coordinates: 30°40′29″N 51°31′15″E
- Country: Iran
- Province: Kohgiluyeh and Boyer-Ahmad
- County: Boyer-Ahmad
- Bakhsh: Central
- Rural District: Dasht-e Rum

Population (2006)
  - Total: 30
- Time zone: UTC+3:30 (IRST)
  - Summer (DST): UTC+4:30 (IRDT)

Hoseynabad-e Sofla (Persian: حسين ابادسفلي, also Romanized as Ḩoseynābād-e Soflá; also known as Ḩoseynābād) is a village in Dasht-e Rum Rural District, in the Central District of Boyer-Ahmad County, Kohgiluyeh and Boyer-Ahmad Province, Iran. At the 2006 census, its population was 30, in 7 families.
