= Hoseynabad-e Vali Mohammad =

Hoseynabad-e Vali Mohammad حسين ابادولي محمد
- Village
- Country: Iran
- Province: Kerman
- County: Fahraj
- Bakhsh: Negin Kavir
- Rural District: Chahdegal

Population (2006)
  - Total: 18
- Time zone: UTC+3:30 (IRST)
  - Summer (DST): UTC+4:30 (IRDT)

Hoseynabad-e Vali Mohammad (Persian: حسين ابادولي محمد, also Romanized as Ḩoseynābād-e Valī Moḩammad) is a village in Chahdegal Rural District, Negin Kavir District, Fahraj County, Kerman Province, Iran. At the 2006 census, its population was 18, in 4 families.
