= Shahrak-e Hoseynabad =

Shahrak-e Hoseynabad شهرک حسين آباد
- Village
- Location within Iran
- Coordinates: 26°59′30″N 59°18′56″E
- Country: Iran
- Province: Sistan and Baluchestan
- County: Dalgan
- Bakhsh: Jolgeh-ye Chah Hashem
- Rural District: Jolgeh-ye Chah Hashem

Population (2006)
  - Total: 958
- Time zone: UTC+3:30 (IRST)
  - Summer (DST): UTC+4:30 (IRDT)

Shahrak-e Hoseynabad (Persian: شهرک حسين آباد, also Romanized as Shahrak-e Ḩoseynābād; also known as Garūn and Ḩoseynābād) is a village in Jolgeh-ye Chah Hashem Rural District, Jolgeh-ye Chah Hashem District, Dalgan County, Sistan and Baluchestan Province, Iran. At the 2006 census, its population was 958, in 168 families.
