= Hoseynabad-e Surmaq =

Hoseynabad-e Surmaq حسين ابادسورمق
- Village
- Location within Iran
- Coordinates: 29°13′00″N 54°11′30″E
- Country: Iran
- Province: Fars
- County: Neyriz
- Bakhsh: Central
- Rural District: Rostaq

Population (2006)
  - Total: 82
- Time zone: UTC+3:30 (IRST)
  - Summer (DST): UTC+4:30 (IRDT)

Hoseynabad-e Surmaq (Persian: حسين ابادسورمق, also Romanized as Ḩoseynābād-e Sūrmaq; also known as Hosein Abad Soormagh and Ḩoseynābād-e Sūrmag) is a village in Rostaq Rural District, in the Central District of Neyriz County, Fars province, Iran. At the 2006 census, its population was 82, in 16 families.
