= Hoseynabad-e Hormeh =

Hoseynabad-e Hormeh حسين ابادحرمه
- Village
- Location within Iran
- Coordinates: 28°06′21″N 57°17′32″E
- Country: Iran
- Province: Kerman
- County: Faryab
- Bakhsh: Central
- Rural District: Golashkerd

Population (2006)
  - Total: 45
- Time zone: UTC+3:30 (IRST)
  - Summer (DST): UTC+4:30 (IRDT)

Hoseynabad-e Hormeh (Persian: حسين ابادحرمه, also Romanized as Ḩoseynābād-e Ḩormeh; also known as Ḩoseynābād) is a village in Golashkerd Rural District, in the Central District of Faryab County, Kerman Province, Iran. At the 2006 census, its population was 45, in 11 families.
