= Hoseynabad, Manujan =

Hoseynabad حسين اباد
- Village
- Location within Iran
- Coordinates: 27°25′05″N 57°33′43″E
- Country: Iran
- Province: Kerman
- County: Manujan
- Bakhsh: Central
- Rural District: Qaleh

Population (2006)
  - Total: 1,728
- Time zone: UTC+3:30 (IRST)
  - Summer (DST): UTC+4:30 (IRDT)

Hoseynabad (Persian: حسين اباد, also romanized as Ḩoseynābād; also known as Ḩoseinābād-e Manūjān and Hosein Abad Manoojan) is a village in Qaleh Rural District, in the Central District of Manujan County, Kerman Province, Iran. At the 2006 census, its population was 1,728, in 355 families.
