= Hoseynabad, Paskhan =

Hoseynabad حسين اباد
- Village
- Location within Iran
- Coordinates: 28°47′47″N 54°17′02″E
- Country: Iran
- Province: Fars
- County: Darab
- Bakhsh: Central
- Rural District: Paskhan

Population (2006)
  - Total: 645
- Time zone: UTC+3:30 (IRST)
  - Summer (DST): UTC+4:30 (IRDT)

Hoseynabad (Persian: حسين اباد, also romanized as Ḩoseynābād) is a village in Paskhan Rural District, in the Central District of Darab County, Fars province, Iran. At the 2006 census, its population was 645, in 141 families.
