= Hoseynabad-e Makhtari =

Hoseynabad-e Makhtari حسين ابادمختاري
- Village
- Location within Iran
- Coordinates: 36°03′58″N 58°54′01″E
- Country: Iran
- Province: Razavi Khorasan
- County: Nishapur
- Bakhsh: Central
- Rural District: Rivand

Population (2006)
  - Total: 46
- Time zone: UTC+3:30 (IRST)
  - Summer (DST): UTC+4:30 (IRDT)

Hoseynabad-e Makhtari (Persian: حسين ابادمختاري, also Romanized as Ḩoseynābād-e Makhtārī; also known as Ḩoseynābād) is a village in Rivand Rural District, in the Central District of Nishapur County, Razavi Khorasan Province, Iran. At the 2006 census, its population was 46, in 14 families.
