= Hoseynabad-e Deylami =

Hoseynabad-e Deylami حسين ابادديلمي
- Village
- Location within Iran
- Coordinates: 29°43′55″N 51°31′04″E
- Country: Iran
- Province: Fars
- County: Kazerun
- Bakhsh: Chenar Shahijan
- Rural District: Anarestan

Population (2006)
  - Total: 230
- Time zone: UTC+3:30 (IRST)
  - Summer (DST): UTC+4:30 (IRDT)

Hoseynabad-e Deylami (Persian: حسين ابادديلمي, also Romanized as Ḩoseynābād-e Deylamī; also known as Ḩoseynābād) is a village in Anarestan Rural District, Chenar Shahijan District, Kazerun County, Fars province, Iran. At the 2006 census, its population was 230, in 48 families.
