= Hoseynabad Pol-e Abrish =

Hoseynabad Pol-e Abrish حسين آباد پل ابريش
- Village
- Location within Iran
- Coordinates: 36°35′46″N 56°19′34″E
- Country: Iran
- Province: Semnan
- County: Meyami
- Bakhsh: Central
- Rural District: Kalat-e Hay-ye Sharqi

Population (2006)
  - Total: 138
- Time zone: UTC+3:30 (IRST)
  - Summer (DST): UTC+4:30 (IRDT)

Hoseynabad Pol-e Abrish (Persian: حسين آباد پل ابريش, also Romanized as Ḩoseynābād Pol-e Abrīsh; also known as Ḩoseynābād Pol-e Abrīsham) is a village in Kalat-e Hay-ye Sharqi Rural District, in the Central District of Meyami County, Semnan Province, Iran. At the 2006 census, its population was 138, in 31 families.
