= Hoseynabad-e Sarhang =

Hoseynabad-e Sarhang حسين ابادسرهنگ
- Village
- Location within Iran
- Coordinates: 28°41′47″N 59°03′44″E
- Country: Iran
- Province: Kerman
- County: Rigan
- Bakhsh: Central
- Rural District: Rigan

Population (2006)
  - Total: 138
- Time zone: UTC+3:30 (IRST)
  - Summer (DST): UTC+4:30 (IRDT)

Hoseynabad-e Sarhang (Persian: حسين ابادسرهنگ, also Romanized as Ḩoseynābād-e Sarhang; also known as Hosein Abad and Ḩoseynābād) is a village in Rigan Rural District, in the Central District of Rigan County, Kerman Province, Iran. At the 2006 census, its population was 138, in 39 families.
