= Hoseynabad-e Mokhtar =

Hoseynabad-e Mokhtar حسين ابادمختار
- Village
- Location within Iran
- Coordinates: 30°43′24″N 50°30′32″E
- Country: Iran
- Province: Kohgiluyeh and Boyer-Ahmad
- County: Boyer-Ahmad
- Bakhsh: Central
- Rural District: Sarrud-e Jonubi

Population (2006)
  - Total: 149
- Time zone: UTC+3:30 (IRST)
  - Summer (DST): UTC+4:30 (IRDT)

Hoseynabad-e Mokhtar (Persian: حسين ابادمختار, also Romanized as Ḩoseynābād-e Mokhtār; also known as Ḩoseynābād) is a village in Sarrud-e Jonubi Rural District, in the Central District of Boyer-Ahmad County, Kohgiluyeh and Boyer-Ahmad Province, Iran. At the 2006 census, its population was 149, in 30 families.
