= Perchelehzar =

Perchelehzar پرچله زار
- Village
- Location within Iran
- Coordinates: 30°39′52″N 50°11′28″E
- Country: Iran
- Province: Khuzestan
- County: Behbahan
- Bakhsh: Central
- Rural District: Dodangeh

Population (2006)
  - Total: 211
- Time zone: UTC+3:30 (IRST)
  - Summer (DST): UTC+4:30 (IRDT)

Perchelehzar (Persian: پرچله زار, also Romanized as Perchelehzār; also known as Ḩoseynābād-e Solţānī and Perchelīzār) is a village in Dodangeh Rural District, in the Central District of Behbahan County, Khuzestan Province, Iran. At the 2006 census, its population was 211, in 41 families.
