= Hoseynabad-e Khoda Bandeh =

Hoseynabad-e Khoda Bandeh حسين ابادخدابنده
- Village
- Location within Iran
- Coordinates: 28°49′35″N 59°02′16″E
- Country: Iran
- Province: Kerman
- County: Fahraj
- Bakhsh: Negin Kavir
- Rural District: Chahdegal

Population (2006)
  - Total: 155
- Time zone: UTC+3:30 (IRST)
  - Summer (DST): UTC+4:30 (IRDT)

Hoseynabad-e Khoda Bandeh (Persian: حسين ابادخدابنده, also Romanized as Ḩoseynābād-e Khodā Bandeh; also known as Hosein Abad and Ḩoseynābād) is a village in Chahdegal Rural District, Negin Kavir District, Fahraj County, Kerman Province, Iran.

== Demographics ==
=== 2006 Census ===
At the 2006 census, its population was 155, in 39 families.
