= Hoseynabad-e Mazafari =

Hoseynabad-e Mazafari حسين ابادمظفري
- Village
- Location within Iran
- Coordinates: 28°14′16″N 57°32′01″E
- Country: Iran
- Province: Kerman
- County: Anbarabad
- Bakhsh: Esmaili
- Rural District: Ganjabad

Population (2006)
  - Total: 18
- Time zone: UTC+3:30 (IRST)
  - Summer (DST): UTC+4:30 (IRDT)

Hoseynabad-e Mazafari (Persian: حسين ابادمظفري, also Romanized as Ḩoseynābād-e Maẓafarī; also known as Hosein Abad Kahnooj and Ḩoseynābād) is a village in Ganjabad Rural District, Esmaili District, Anbarabad County, Kerman Province, Iran. At the 2006 census, its population was 18, in 4 families.
