= Kukok =

Village in Yazd, Iran

Kukok كوكك
- Village
- Location within Iran
- Coordinates: 31°23′27″N 54°21′15″E
- Country: Iran
- Province: Yazd
- County: Mehriz
- Bakhsh: Central
- Rural District: Tang Chenar

Population (2006)
  - Total: 122
- Time zone: UTC+3:30 (IRST)
  - Summer (DST): UTC+4:30 (IRDT)

Kukok (Persian: كوكك, also Romanized as Kūkok and Kow Kok; also known as Kabkābād and ’oseynābād-e Kūkok) is a village in Tang Chenar Rural District, in the Central District of Mehriz County, Yazd Province, Iran. At the 2006 census, its population was 122, in 39 families.
