= Hoseynabad-e Shurabeh =

Hoseynabad-e Shurabeh حسين ابادشورابه
- Village
- Location within Iran
- Coordinates: 31°45′12″N 53°54′37″E
- Country: Iran
- Province: Yazd
- County: Taft
- Bakhsh: Central
- Rural District: Nasrabad

Population (2006)
  - Total: 23
- Time zone: UTC+3:30 (IRST)
  - Summer (DST): UTC+4:30 (IRDT)

Hoseynabad-e Shurabeh (Persian: حسين ابادشورابه, romanized: Ḩoseynābād-e Shūrābeh) also known as Ḩoseynābād, is a village in Nasrabad Rural District, in the Central District of Taft County, Yazd Province, Iran. At the 2006 census, its population was 23, in 7 families.
