= Hoseynabad Sar Kazeh =

Hoseynabad Sar Kazeh حسين ابادسركازه
- Village
- Location within Iran
- Coordinates: 31°44′46″N 56°03′15″E
- Country: Iran
- Province: Yazd
- County: Behabad
- Bakhsh: Central
- Rural District: Banestan

Population (2006)
  - Total: 109
- Time zone: UTC+3:30 (IRST)
  - Summer (DST): UTC+4:30 (IRDT)

Hoseynabad Sar Kazeh (Persian: حسين ابادسركازه, also Romanized as Ḩoseynābād Sar Kāzeh; also known as Ḩoseynābād) is a village in Banestan Rural District, in the Central District of Behabad County, Yazd Province, Iran. At the 2006 census, its population was 109, in 27 families.
