= Dowzan =

Dowzan دوزن
- Village
- Location within Iran
- Coordinates: 38°49′36″N 44°49′27″E
- Country: Iran
- Province: West Azerbaijan
- County: Chaypareh
- Bakhsh: Central
- Rural District: Bastam

Population (2006)
  - Total: 32
- Time zone: UTC+3:30 (IRST)
  - Summer (DST): UTC+4:30 (IRDT)

Dowzan (Persian: دوزن; also known as Ḩoseynābād) is a village in Bastam Rural District, in the Central District of Chaypareh County, West Azerbaijan Province, Iran. At the 2006 census, its population was 32, in 9 families.
