= Hoseynabad-e Eqbal =

Coordinates: 36°17′50″N 50°04′14″E

Hoseynabad-e Eqbal حسن اباداقبال
- Village
- Interactive map of Hoseynabad-e Eqbal
- Country: Iran
- Province: Qazvin
- County: Qazvin
- Bakhsh: Central
- Rural District: Eqbal-e Gharbi

Population (2006)
  - Total: 85
- Time zone: UTC+3:30 (IRST)
  - Summer (DST): UTC+4:30 (IRDT)

Hoseynabad-e Eqbal (Persian: حسن اباداقبال, also Romanized as Ḩoseynābād-e Eqbāl) is a village in Eqbal-e Gharbi Rural District, in the Central District of Qazvin County, Qazvin Province, Iran. At the 2006 census, its population was 85, in 25 families.
