= Hoseynabad, Arzuiyeh =

Hoseynabad حسين اباد
- Village
- Location within Iran
- Coordinates: 28°24′35″N 56°21′23″E
- Country: Iran
- Province: Kerman
- County: Arzuiyeh
- Bakhsh: Central
- Rural District: Arzuiyeh

Population (2006)
  - Total: 478
- Time zone: UTC+3:30 (IRST)
  - Summer (DST): UTC+4:30 (IRDT)

Hoseynabad (Persian: حسين اباد, also Romanized as Ḩoseynābād; also known as Hosein Abad Arzoo’eyeh and Ḩoseynābād-e Ārzū’īyeh) is a village in Arzuiyeh Rural District, in the Central District of Arzuiyeh County, Kerman Province, Iran. At the 2006 census, its population was 478, in 109 families.
