= Hoseynabad, Hirmand =

Hoseynabad حسين آباد
- Village
- Location within Iran
- Coordinates: 31°07′17″N 61°41′34″E
- Country: Iran
- Province: Sistan and Baluchestan
- County: Hirmand
- Bakhsh: Central
- Rural District: Margan

Population (2006)
  - Total: 58
- Time zone: UTC+3:30 (IRST)
  - Summer (DST): UTC+4:30 (IRDT)

Hoseynabad (Persian: حسين آباد, also Romanized as Ḩoseynābād) is a village in Margan Rural District, in the Central District of Hirmand County, Sistan and Baluchestan Province, Iran. At the 2006 census, its population was 58, in 10 families.
