= Hoseynabad-e Katak =

Hoseynabad-e Katak حسين ابادكتك
- Village
- Location within Iran
- Coordinates: 29°42′56″N 53°14′22″E
- Country: Iran
- Province: Fars
- County: Arsanjan
- Bakhsh: Central
- Rural District: Shurab

Population (2006)
  - Total: 152
- Time zone: UTC+3:30 (IRST)
  - Summer (DST): UTC+4:30 (IRDT)

Hoseynabad-e Katak (Persian: حسين ابادكتك, also Romanized as Ḩoseynābād-e Katak; also known as Ḩoseynābād) is a village in Shurab Rural District, in the Central District of Arsanjan County, Fars province, Iran. At the 2006 census, its population was 152, in 35 families.
