= Hoseynabad, Eqlid =

Hoseynabad حسين اباد
- Village
- Location within Iran
- Coordinates: 30°41′19″N 52°35′45″E
- Country: Iran
- Province: Fars
- County: Eqlid
- Bakhsh: Central
- Rural District: Khonjesht

Population (2006)
  - Total: 281
- Time zone: UTC+3:30 (IRST)
  - Summer (DST): UTC+4:30 (IRDT)

Hoseynabad (Persian: حسين اباد, also Romanized as Ḩoseynābād; also known as Qal‘eh-e Ḩoseynābād) is a village in Khonjesht Rural District, in the Central District of Eqlid County, Fars province, Iran. At the 2006 census, its population was 281, in 61 families.
