= Hoseynabad-e Ardeshiri =

Hoseynabad-e Ardeshiri حسين اباد اردشيرئ
- Village
- Location within Iran
- Coordinates: 30°03′34″N 52°01′58″E
- Country: Iran
- Province: Fars
- County: Sepidan
- Bakhsh: Hamaijan
- Rural District: Sornabad

Population (2006)
  - Total: 110
- Time zone: UTC+3:30 (IRST)
  - Summer (DST): UTC+4:30 (IRDT)

Hoseynabad-e Ardeshiri (Persian: حسين اباد اردشيرئ, also romanized as Ḩoseynābād-e Ārdeshīri; also known as Ḩoseynābād) is a village in Sornabad Rural District, Hamaijan District, Sepidan County, Fars province, Iran. At the 2006 census its population was 110, in 25 families.
