= Hoseynabad-e Fazeli =

Hoseynabad-e Fazeli حسين ابادافضلي
- Village
- Location within Iran
- Coordinates: 29°27′20″N 55°36′46″E
- Country: Iran
- Province: Kerman
- County: Sirjan
- Bakhsh: Central
- Rural District: Sharifabad

Population (2006)
  - Total: 23
- Time zone: UTC+3:30 (IRST)
  - Summer (DST): UTC+4:30 (IRDT)

Hoseynabad-e Fazeli (Persian: حسين ابادافضلي, also Romanized as Ḩoseynābād-e Faz̤elī; also known as Ḩoseynābād) is a village in Sharifabad Rural District, in the Central District of Sirjan County, Kerman Province, Iran. At the 2006 census, its population was 23, in five families.
