= Hoseynabad-e Rismani =

Hoseynabad-e Rismani حسين ابادريسماني
- Village
- Interactive map of Hoseynabad-e Rismani
- Country: Iran
- Province: Yazd
- County: Yazd
- Bakhsh: Central
- Rural District: Fahraj

Population (2006)
  - Total: 1,197
- Time zone: UTC+3:30 (IRST)
  - Summer (DST): UTC+4:30 (IRDT)

Hoseynabad-e Rismani (Persian: حسين ابادريسماني, also Romanized as Ḩoseynābād-e Rīsmānī) is a village in Fahraj Rural District, in the Central District of Yazd County, Yazd Province, Iran. At the 2006 census, its population was 1,197, in 295 families.
