= Hoseynabad-e Nazer =

Hoseynabad-e Nazer حسين ابادناظر
- Village
- Location within Iran
- Coordinates: 36°10′01″N 58°54′30″E
- Country: Iran
- Province: Razavi Khorasan
- County: Nishapur
- Bakhsh: Central
- Rural District: Fazl

Population (2006)
  - Total: 197
- Time zone: UTC+3:30 (IRST)
  - Summer (DST): UTC+4:30 (IRDT)

Hoseynabad-e Nazer (Persian: حسين ابادناظر, also Romanized as Ḩoseynābād-e Nāz̧er) is a village in Fazl Rural District, in the Central District of Nishapur County, Razavi Khorasan Province, Iran. At the 2006 census, its population was 197, in 63 families.
