= Hoseynabad, Honam =

Hoseynabad حسين اباد
- Village
- Location within Iran
- Coordinates: 33°48′52″N 48°12′49″E
- Country: Iran
- Province: Lorestan
- County: Selseleh
- Bakhsh: Central
- Rural District: Honam

Population (2006)
  - Total: 82
- Time zone: UTC+3:30 (IRST)
  - Summer (DST): UTC+4:30 (IRDT)

Hoseynabad (Persian: حسين اباد, also Romanized as Ḩoseynābād) is a village in Honam Rural District, in the Central District of Selseleh County, Lorestan Province, Iran. At the 2006 census, its population was 82, in 20 families.
