= Hoseynabad, Sarvabad =

Hoseynabad حسین‌آباد
- Village
- Country: Iran
- Province: Kurdistan
- County: Sarvabad
- Bakhsh: Central
- Rural District: Dezli

Population (2006)
  - Total: 265
- Time zone: UTC+3:30 (IRST)
  - Summer (DST): UTC+4:30 (IRDT)

Hoseynabad (Persian: حسین‌آباد, also Romanized as Ḩoseynābād) is a village in Dezli Rural District, in the Central District of Sarvabad County, Kurdistan Province, Iran. At the 2006 census, its population was 265, in 70 families. The village is populated by Kurds.
