= Hoseynabad-e Alam Khan =

Hoseynabad-e Alam Khan حسين اباد علم خان
- Village
- Location within Iran
- Coordinates: 28°55′29″N 58°49′47″E
- Country: Iran
- Province: Kerman
- County: Fahraj
- Bakhsh: Central
- Rural District: Fahraj

Population (2006)
  - Total: 1,046
- Time zone: UTC+3:30 (IRST)
  - Summer (DST): UTC+4:30 (IRDT)

Hoseynabad-e Alam Khan (Persian: حسين اباد علم خان, also Romanized as Ḩoseynābād-e ‘Alam Khān; also known as Hosein Abad and Ḩoseynābād) is a village in Fahraj Rural District, in the Central District of Fahraj County, Kerman Province, Iran. At the 2006 census, its population was 1,046, in 240 families.
