= Hoseynabad-e Kamal al Malek =

Hoseynabad-e Kamal al Malek حسين ابادكمال الملك
- Village
- Location within Iran
- Coordinates: 36°14′50″N 58°35′03″E
- Country: Iran
- Province: Razavi Khorasan
- County: Firuzeh
- Bakhsh: Central
- Rural District: Takht-e Jolgeh

Population (2006)
  - Total: 53
- Time zone: UTC+3:30 (IRST)
  - Summer (DST): UTC+4:30 (IRDT)

Hoseynabad-e Kamal al Malek (Persian: حسين ابادكمال الملك, also Romanized as Ḩoseynābād-e Kamāl āl Maleḵ; also known as Ḩoseynābād-e Kamāl) is a village in Takht-e Jolgeh Rural District, in the Central District of Firuzeh County, Razavi Khorasan Province, Iran. At the 2006 census, its population was 53, in 10 families.
