= Hoseynabad-e Amjadi =

Hoseynabad-e Amjadi حسين ابادامجدي
- Village
- Location within Iran
- Coordinates: 35°00′00″N 47°27′00″E
- Country: Iran
- Province: Kermanshah
- County: Sonqor
- Bakhsh: Central
- Rural District: Gavrud

Population (2006)
  - Total: 333
- Time zone: UTC+3:30 (IRST)
  - Summer (DST): UTC+4:30 (IRDT)

Hoseynabad-e Amjadi (Persian: حسين ابادامجدي, also Romanized as Ḩoseynābād-e Amjadī) is a village in Gavrud Rural District, in the Central District of Sonqor County, Kermanshah Province, Iran. At the 2006 census, its population was 333, in 73 families.
