= Hoseynabad-e Qoroq =

Hoseynabad-e Qoroq حسين ابادقرق
- Village
- Location within Iran
- Coordinates: 30°01′08″N 52°29′48″E
- Country: Iran
- Province: Fars
- County: Marvdasht
- Bakhsh: Dorudzan
- Rural District: Ramjerd-e Do

Population (2006)
  - Total: 137
- Time zone: UTC+3:30 (IRST)
  - Summer (DST): UTC+4:30 (IRDT)

Hoseynabad-e Qoroq (Persian: حسين ابادقرق, also Romanized as Ḩoseynābād-e Qoroq; also known as Ḩoseynābād) is a village in Ramjerd-e Do Rural District, Dorudzan District, Marvdasht County, Fars province, Iran. At the 2006 census, its population was 137, in 41 families.
