= Hoseynabad-e Shafi =

Hoseynabad-e Shafi حسين ابادشفيعي
- Village
- Location within Iran
- Coordinates: 30°26′10″N 56°08′39″E
- Country: Iran
- Province: Kerman
- County: Rafsanjan
- Bakhsh: Central
- Rural District: Qasemabad

Population (2006)
  - Total: 332
- Time zone: UTC+3:30 (IRST)
  - Summer (DST): UTC+4:30 (IRDT)

Hoseynabad-e Shafi (Persian: حسين ابادشفيعي, also Romanized as Ḩoseynābād-e Shafī‘; also known as Deh Shafī‘, Hosein Abad Yoosef, Ḩoseynābād, Ḩoseynābād-e Deh Shafī‘, and Ḩoseynābād-e Ḩājī Yūsef) is a village in Qasemabad Rural District, in the Central District of Rafsanjan County, Kerman Province, Iran. At the 2006 census, its population was 332, in 76 families.
