= Hoseynabad-e Latabad =

Hoseynabad-e Latabad حسين ابادلات اباد
- Village
- Interactive map of Hoseynabad-e Latabad
- Country: Iran
- Province: Kerman
- County: Rigan
- Bakhsh: Central
- Rural District: Rigan

Population (2006)
  - Total: 67
- Time zone: UTC+3:30 (IRST)
  - Summer (DST): UTC+4:30 (IRDT)

Hoseynabad-e Latabad (Persian: حسين ابادلات اباد, also Romanized as Ḩoseynābād-e Lātābād) is a village in Rigan Rural District, in the Central District of Rigan County, Kerman Province, Iran. At the 2006 census, its population was 67, in 13 families.
