= Hoseynabad-e Marran =

Hoseynabad-e Marran حسين آباد مران
- Village
- Location within Iran
- Coordinates: 36°14′40″N 46°54′28″E
- Country: Iran
- Province: Kurdistan
- County: Divandarreh
- Bakhsh: Karaftu
- Rural District: Obatu

Population (2006)
  - Total: 113
- Time zone: UTC+3:30 (IRST)
  - Summer (DST): UTC+4:30 (IRDT)

Hoseynabad-e Marran (Persian: حسين آباد مران, also Romanized as Ḩoseynābād-e Marrān and Ḩoseynābād-e Merān; also known as Ḩoseynābād) is a village in Obatu Rural District, Karaftu District, Divandarreh County, Kurdistan Province, Iran. At the 2006 census, its population was 113, in 35 families. The village is populated by Kurds.
