= Hoseynabad-e Harandi =

Hoseynabad-e Harandi حسين ابادهرندي
- Village
- Location within Iran
- Coordinates: 28°21′30″N 57°43′00″E
- Country: Iran
- Province: Kerman
- County: Anbarabad
- Bakhsh: Esmaili
- Rural District: Hoseynabad

Population (2006)
  - Total: 302
- Time zone: UTC+3:30 (IRST)
  - Summer (DST): UTC+4:30 (IRDT)

Hoseynabad-e Harandi (Persian: حسين ابادهرندي, also Romanized as Ḩoseynābād-e Harandī, Hosein Abad Harandi, and Ḩoseynābād Harandī) is a village in Hoseynabad Rural District, Esmaili District, Anbarabad County, Kerman Province, Iran. At the 2006 census, its population was 302, in 55 families.
