= Hoseynabad-e Harom =

Hoseynabad-e Harom حسين ابادهارم
- Village
- Location within Iran
- Coordinates: 28°56′28″N 53°45′19″E
- Country: Iran
- Province: Fars
- County: Fasa
- Bakhsh: Central
- Rural District: Kushk-e Qazi

Population (2006)
  - Total: 108
- Time zone: UTC+3:30 (IRST)
  - Summer (DST): UTC+4:30 (IRDT)

Hoseynabad-e Harom (Persian: حسين ابادهارم, also Romanized as Ḩoseynābād-e Hārom; also known as Ḩoseynābād) is a village in Kushk-e Qazi Rural District, in the Central District of Fasa County, Fars province, Iran. At the 2006 census, its population was 108, in 22 families.
