= Quchabad-e Mohammad Khan =

Quchabad-e Mohammad Khan قوچ ابادمحمدخان
- Village
- Location within Iran
- Coordinates: 28°02′03″N 57°48′10″E
- Country: Iran
- Province: Kerman
- County: Kahnuj
- Bakhsh: Central
- Rural District: Nakhlestan

Population (2006)
  - Total: 298
- Time zone: UTC+3:30 (IRST)
  - Summer (DST): UTC+4:30 (IRDT)

Quchabad-e Mohammad Khan (Persian: قوچ ابادمحمدخان, also Romanized as Qūchābād-e Moḩammad Khān; also known as Ḩoseynābād, Qūchābād, and Qūchābād-e Şamşām) is a village in Nakhlestan Rural District, in the Central District of Kahnuj County, Kerman Province, Iran. At the 2006 census, its population was 298, in 63 families.
