= Hoseynabad-e Molla Amir =

Hoseynabad-e Molla Amir حسين ابادملاامير
- Village
- Location within Iran
- Coordinates: 28°46′53″N 59°06′26″E
- Country: Iran
- Province: Kerman
- County: Fahraj
- Bakhsh: Negin Kavir
- Rural District: Chahdegal

Population (2006)
  - Total: 330
- Time zone: UTC+3:30 (IRST)
  - Summer (DST): UTC+4:30 (IRDT)

Hoseynabad-e Molla Amir (Persian: حسين ابادملاامير, also Romanized as Ḩoseynābād-e Mollā Amīr and Hosein Abad Molla Amir) is a village in Chahdegal Rural District, Negin Kavir District, Fahraj County, Kerman Province, Iran. At the 2006 census, its population was 330, in 79 families.
