= Hoseynabad-e Chaghuki =

Hoseynabad-e Chaghuki حسين ابادچغوكي
- Village
- Location within Iran
- Coordinates: 36°00′50″N 58°53′20″E
- Country: Iran
- Province: Razavi Khorasan
- County: Nishapur
- Bakhsh: Central
- Rural District: Darbqazi

Population (2006)
  - Total: 51
- Time zone: UTC+3:30 (IRST)
  - Summer (DST): UTC+4:30 (IRDT)

Hoseynabad-e Chaghuki (Persian: حسين ابادچغوكي, also Romanized as Ḩoseynābād-e Chaghūkī) is a village in Darbqazi Rural District, in the Central District of Nishapur County, Razavi Khorasan Province, Iran. At the 2006 census, its population was 51, in 12 families.
