= Hoseynabad, Qaleh Ganj =

Hoseynabad حسين اباد
- Village
- Location within Iran
- Coordinates: 27°42′37″N 57°58′54″E
- Country: Iran
- Province: Kerman
- County: Qaleh Ganj
- Bakhsh: Central
- Rural District: Sorkh Qaleh

Population (2006)
  - Total: 334
- Time zone: UTC+3:30 (IRST)
  - Summer (DST): UTC+4:30 (IRDT)

Hoseynabad (Persian: حسين اباد, also Romanized as Ḩoseynābād; also known as Ḩoseynābād-e Nūrbībī) is a village in Sorkh Qaleh Rural District, in the Central District of Qaleh Ganj County, Kerman Province, Iran. At the 2006 census, its population was 334, in 81 families.
