= Hoseynabad-e Zeydar =

Hoseynabad-e Zeydar حسين ابادزيدر
- Village
- Location within Iran
- Coordinates: 32°18′58″N 59°28′25″E
- Country: Iran
- Province: South Khorasan
- County: Sarbisheh
- Bakhsh: Mud
- Rural District: Naharjan

Population (2006)
  - Total: 52
- Time zone: UTC+3:30 (IRST)
  - Summer (DST): UTC+4:30 (IRDT)

Hoseynabad-e Zeydar (Persian: حسين ابادزيدر, also Romanized as Ḩoseynābād-e Zeydar) is a village in Naharjan Rural District, Mud District, Sarbisheh County, South Khorasan Province, Iran. At the 2006 census, its population was 52, in 14 families.
