= Hoseynabad-e Sar Jangal =

Hoseynabad-e Sar Jangal حسين ابادسرجنگل
- Village
- Location within Iran
- Coordinates: 28°48′26″N 59°01′24″E
- Country: Iran
- Province: Kerman
- County: Fahraj
- Bakhsh: Negin Kavir
- Rural District: Chahdegal

Population (2006)
  - Total: 315
- Time zone: UTC+3:30 (IRST)
  - Summer (DST): UTC+4:30 (IRDT)

Hoseynabad-e Sar Jangal (Persian: حسين ابادسرجنگل, also Romanized as Ḩoseynābād-e Sar Jangal and Hosein Abad Sar Jangal) is a village in Chahdegal Rural District, Negin Kavir District, Fahraj County, Kerman Province, Iran. At the 2006 census, its population was 315, in 67 families.
