= Hoseynabad-e Rumani =

Hoseynabad-e Rumani حسين ابادرومني
- Village
- Location within Iran
- Coordinates: 30°02′05″N 55°10′20″E
- Country: Iran
- Province: Kerman
- County: Shahr-e Babak
- Bakhsh: Central
- Rural District: Estabraq

Population (2006)
  - Total: 39
- Time zone: UTC+3:30 (IRST)
  - Summer (DST): UTC+4:30 (IRDT)

Hoseynabad-e Rumani (Persian: حسين ابادرومني, also Romanized as Ḩoseynābād-e Rūmanī; also known as Ḩoseynābād) is a village in Estabraq Rural District, in the Central District of Shahr-e Babak County, Kerman Province, Iran. At the 2006 census, its population was 39, in 9 families.
