= Hoseynabad-e Zirki =

Hoseynabad-e Zirki حسين ابادزيركي
- Village
- Location within Iran
- Coordinates: 28°40′00″N 57°39′00″E
- Country: Iran
- Province: Kerman
- County: Jiroft
- Bakhsh: Central
- Rural District: Eslamabad

Population (2006)
  - Total: 418
- Time zone: UTC+3:30 (IRST)
  - Summer (DST): UTC+4:30 (IRDT)

Hoseynabad-e Zirki (Persian: حسين ابادزيركي, also Romanized as Ḩoseynābād-e Zīrkī; also known as Ḩoseynābād and Ḩoseynābād-e Nakhlī) is a village in Eslamabad Rural District, in the Central District of Jiroft County, Kerman Province, Iran. At the 2006 census, its population was 418, in 88 families.
