= Hoseynabad-e Fishtaqeh =

Hoseynabad-e Fishtaqeh حسين ابادفيش تقه
- Village
- Location within Iran
- Coordinates: 29°36′09″N 53°16′27″E
- Country: Iran
- Province: Fars
- County: Kharameh
- Bakhsh: Central
- Rural District: Sofla

Population (2006)
  - Total: 511
- Time zone: UTC+3:30 (IRST)
  - Summer (DST): UTC+4:30 (IRDT)

Hoseynabad-e Fishtaqeh (Persian: حسين ابادفيش تقه, also Romanized as Ḩoseynābād-e Fīshtaqeh; also known as Ḩoseynābād, Ḩoseynābād-e Fashtaqeh, Hoseynābad-e Foshtaqeh, and Ḩoseynābād-e Foshtaqqeh) is a village in Sofla Rural District, in the Central District of Kharameh County, Fars province, Iran. At the 2006 census, its population was 511, in 118 families.
