= Hoseynabad, Sepidan =

Hoseynabad حسين اباد
- Village
- Location within Iran
- Coordinates: 30°20′14″N 52°03′00″E
- Country: Iran
- Province: Fars
- County: Sepidan
- Bakhsh: Hamaijan
- Rural District: Shesh Pir

Population (2006)
  - Total: 36
- Time zone: UTC+3:30 (IRST)
  - Summer (DST): UTC+4:30 (IRDT)

Hoseynabad (Persian: حسين اباد, also Romanized as Ḩoseynābād) is a village in Shesh Pir Rural District, Hamaijan District, Sepidan County, Fars province, Iran. At the 2006 census, its population was 36, in 6 families.
