= Hoseynabad-e Rud Shur =

Hoseynabad-e Rud Shur حسين اباد رود شور
- Village
- Interactive map of Hoseynabad-e Rud Shur
- Country: Iran
- Province: Kerman
- County: Rigan
- Bakhsh: Central
- Rural District: Rigan

Population (2006)
  - Total: 141
- Time zone: UTC+3:30 (IRST)
  - Summer (DST): UTC+4:30 (IRDT)

Hoseynabad-e Rud Shur (Persian: حسين اباد رود شور, also Romanized as Ḩoseynābād-e Rūd Shūr) is a village in Rigan Rural District, in the Central District of Rigan County, Kerman Province, Iran. At the 2006 census, its population was 141, in 30 families.
