= Hoseynabad-e Amiri, Lorestan =

Hoseynabad-e Amiri حسين اباداميري
- Village
- Location within Iran
- Coordinates: 33°54′11″N 48°15′41″E
- Country: Iran
- Province: Lorestan
- County: Selseleh
- Bakhsh: Central
- Rural District: Yusefvand

Population (2006)
  - Total: 104
- Time zone: UTC+3:30 (IRST)
  - Summer (DST): UTC+4:30 (IRDT)

Hoseynabad-e Amiri (Persian: حسين اباداميري, also Romanized as Ḩoseynābād-e Amīrī; also known as Ḩoseynjān and Ḩoseynābād) is a village in Yusefvand Rural District, in the Central District of Selseleh County, Lorestan Province, Iran. At the 2006 census, its population was 104, in 20 families.
