= Hoseynabad-e Zelleh Jub =

Hoseynabad-e Zelleh Jub حسين آباد ظله جوب
- Village
- Location within Iran
- Coordinates: 35°03′31″N 47°54′45″E
- Country: Iran
- Province: Kurdistan
- County: Qorveh
- Bakhsh: Chaharduli
- Rural District: Chaharduli-ye Gharbi

Population (2006)
  - Total: 155
- Time zone: UTC+3:30 (IRST)
  - Summer (DST): UTC+4:30 (IRDT)

Hoseynabad-e Zelleh Jub (Persian: حسين آباد ظله جوب, also Romanized as Ḩoseynābād-e Z̧elleh Jūb and Ḩoseynābād-e Zeleh Jūb; also known as Ḩoseynābād-e Zeleh Jū) is a village in Chaharduli-ye Gharbi Rural District, Chaharduli District, Qorveh County, Kurdistan Province, Iran. At the 2006 census, its population was 155, in 32 families. The village is populated by Kurds.
