= Hoseynabad-e Eslami, Rafsanjan =

Hosseinabad حسين آباد
- Village
- Location within Iran
- Coordinates: 30°37′56″N 55°35′13″E
- Country: Iran
- Province: Kerman
- County: Rafsanjan
- Bakhsh: Koshkuiyeh
- Rural District: Koshkuiyeh

Population (2006)
  - Total: 16
- Time zone: UTC+3:30 (IRST)
  - Summer (DST): UTC+4:30 (IRDT)

Hosseinabad (Persian: حسين آباد, also Romanized as Ḩosseinābād; also known as Ḩosseinābād) is a village in Koshkuiyeh Rural District, Koshkuiyeh District, Rafsanjan County, Kerman Province, Iran. At the 2006 census, its population was 16, in 6 families.
