= Hoseynabad-e Sargorij =

Hoseynabad-e Sargorij حسين ابادسرگريج
- Village
- Location within Iran
- Coordinates: 28°05′38″N 57°28′12″E
- Country: Iran
- Province: Kerman
- County: Faryab
- Bakhsh: Central
- Rural District: Mehruiyeh

Population (2006)
  - Total: 168
- Time zone: UTC+3:30 (IRST)
  - Summer (DST): UTC+4:30 (IRDT)

Hoseynabad-e Sargorij (Persian: حسين ابادسرگريج, also Romanized as Ḩoseynābād-e Sargorīj; also known as Ḩoseynābād) is a village in Mehruiyeh Rural District, in the Central District of Faryab County, Kerman Province, Iran. At the 2006 census, its population was 168, in 43 families.
