= Hoseynabad-e Gazband =

Hoseynabad-e Gazband حسين ابادگزبند
- Village
- Location within Iran
- Coordinates: 35°53′28″N 60°07′10″E
- Country: Iran
- Province: Razavi Khorasan
- County: Mashhad
- Bakhsh: Razaviyeh
- Rural District: Abravan

Population (2006)
  - Total: 152
- Time zone: UTC+3:30 (IRST)
  - Summer (DST): UTC+4:30 (IRDT)

Hoseynabad-e Gazband (Persian: حسين ابادگزبند, also Romanized as Ḩoseynābād-e Gazband; also known as Ḩoseynābād) is a village in Abravan Rural District, Razaviyeh District, Mashhad County, Razavi Khorasan Province, Iran. At the 2006 census, its population was 152, in 37 families.
