= Hoseynabad-e Abaleh =

Hoseynabad-e Abaleh حسين ابادابله
- Village
- Location within Iran
- Coordinates: 31°51′10″N 59°52′39″E
- Country: Iran
- Province: South Khorasan
- County: Nehbandan
- Bakhsh: Shusef
- Rural District: Shusef

Population (2006)
  - Total: 79
- Time zone: UTC+3:30 (IRST)
  - Summer (DST): UTC+4:30 (IRDT)

Hoseynabad-e Abaleh (Persian: حسين ابادابله, also Romanized as Ḩoseynābād-e Ābaleh) is a village in Shusef Rural District, Shusef District, Nehbandan County, South Khorasan Province, Iran. At the 2006 census, its population was 79, in 21 families.
