= Hoseynabad-e Mahunak =

Hoseynabad-e Mahunak حسين ابادماهونك
- Village
- Location within Iran
- Coordinates: 29°58′00″N 56°23′00″E
- Country: Iran
- Province: Kerman
- County: Bardsir
- Bakhsh: Central
- Rural District: Kuh Panj

Population (2006)
  - Total: 34
- Time zone: UTC+3:30 (IRST)
  - Summer (DST): UTC+4:30 (IRDT)

Hoseynabad-e Mahunak (Persian: حسين ابادماهونك, also Romanized as Ḩoseynābād-e Māhūnak; also known as Ḩoseynābād) is a village in Kuh Panj Rural District, in the Central District of Bardsir County, Kerman Province, Iran. Its population in 2006 was 34, in 12 families.
