= Hoseynabad, Balesh =

Hoseynabad حسين اباد
- Village
- Location within Iran
- Coordinates: 28°56′48″N 54°54′26″E
- Country: Iran
- Province: Fars
- County: Darab
- Bakhsh: Central
- Rural District: Balesh

Population (2006)
  - Total: 243
- Time zone: UTC+3:30 (IRST)
  - Summer (DST): UTC+4:30 (IRDT)

Hoseynabad (Persian: حسين اباد, also Romanized as Ḩoseynābād and Hosein Abad) is a village in Balesh Rural District, in the Central District of Darab County, Fars province, Iran. At the 2006 census, its population was 243, in 58 families.
