= Hoseynabad, Bavanat =

Hoseynabad حسين اباد
- Village
- Location within Iran
- Coordinates: 30°35′24″N 53°24′00″E
- Country: Iran
- Province: Fars
- County: Bavanat
- Bakhsh: Central
- Rural District: Baghestan

Population (2006)
  - Total: 22
- Time zone: UTC+3:30 (IRST)
  - Summer (DST): UTC+4:30 (IRDT)

Hoseynabad (Persian: حسين اباد, also Romanized as Ḩoseynābād) is a village in Baghestan Rural District, in the Central District of Bavanat County, Fars province, Iran. At the 2006 census, its population was 22, in 4 families.
