= Hoseynabad-e Bagh-e Nil =

Hoseynabad-e Bagh-e Nil حسين آباد باغ نيل
- Village
- Location within Iran
- Coordinates: 27°06′26″N 59°27′01″E
- Country: Iran
- Province: Sistan and Baluchestan
- County: Dalgan
- Bakhsh: Jolgeh-ye Chah Hashem
- Rural District: Jolgeh-ye Chah Hashem

Population (2006)
  - Total: 271
- Time zone: UTC+3:30 (IRST)
  - Summer (DST): UTC+4:30 (IRDT)

Hoseynabad-e Bagh-e Nil (Persian: حسين آباد باغ نيل, also Romanized as Ḩoseynābād-e Bāgh-e Nīl) is a village in Jolgeh-ye Chah Hashem Rural District, Jolgeh-ye Chah Hashem District, Dalgan County, Sistan and Baluchestan Province, Iran. At the 2006 census, its population was 271, in 51 families.
