= Hoseynabad-e Sheykh =

Hoseynabad-e Sheykh حسين ابادشيخ
- Village
- Location within Iran
- Coordinates: 30°39′36″N 50°11′50″E
- Country: Iran
- Province: Khuzestan
- County: Behbahan
- Bakhsh: Central
- Rural District: Dodangeh

Population (2006)
  - Total: 133
- Time zone: UTC+3:30 (IRST)
  - Summer (DST): UTC+4:30 (IRDT)

Hoseynabad-e Sheykh (Persian: حسين ابادشيخ, also Romanized as Ḩoseynābād-e Sheykh) is a village in Dodangeh Rural District, in the Central District of Behbahan County, Khuzestan Province, Iran. At the 2006 census, its population was 133, in 29 families.
