= Hoseynabad, Chenaran =

Hoseynabad حسين اباد
- Village
- Location within Iran
- Coordinates: 36°42′10″N 59°02′26″E
- Country: Iran
- Province: Razavi Khorasan
- County: Chenaran
- Bakhsh: Central
- Rural District: Chenaran

Population (2006)
  - Total: 114
- Time zone: UTC+3:30 (IRST)
  - Summer (DST): UTC+4:30 (IRDT)

Hoseynabad (Persian: حسين اباد, also Romanized as Ḩoseynābād; also known as Ḩoseynābād-e ‘Alī Asghar Man Dūst) is a village in Chenaran Rural District, in the Central District of Chenaran County, Razavi Khorasan Province, Iran. At the 2006 census, its population was 114, in 30 families.
