= Hoseynabad-e Nezhadi =

Hoseynabad-e Nezhadi حسين ابادنژادي
- Village
- Location within Iran
- Coordinates: 30°26′48″N 55°52′56″E
- Country: Iran
- Province: Kerman
- County: Rafsanjan
- Bakhsh: Central
- Rural District: Eslamiyeh

Population (2006)
  - Total: 15
- Time zone: UTC+3:30 (IRST)
  - Summer (DST): UTC+4:30 (IRDT)

Hoseynabad-e Nezhadi (Persian: حسين ابادنژادي, also Romanized as Ḩoseynābād-e Nezhādī; also known as Ḩoseynābād) is a village in Eslamiyeh Rural District, in the Central District of Rafsanjan County, Kerman Province, Iran. At the 2006 census, its population was 15, in 7 families.
