= Hoseynabad-e Sadat =

Hoseynabad-e Sadat حسين ابادسادات
- Village
- Location within Iran
- Coordinates: 33°40′54″N 50°06′26″E
- Country: Iran
- Province: Markazi
- County: Khomeyn
- Bakhsh: Central
- Rural District: Salehan

Population (2006)
  - Total: 40
- Time zone: UTC+3:30 (IRST)
  - Summer (DST): UTC+4:30 (IRDT)

Hoseynabad-e Sadat (Persian: حسين ابادسادات, also Romanized as Ḩoseynābād-e Sādāt; also known as Hosein Abad Rostag and Ḩoseynābād) is a village in Salehan Rural District, in the Central District of Khomeyn County, Markazi Province, Iran. At the 2006 census, its population was 40, in 11 families.
