= Hoseynabad-e Sarab =

Hoseynabad-e Sarab حسين ابادسراب
- Village
- Location within Iran
- Coordinates: 29°57′50″N 52°21′47″E
- Country: Iran
- Province: Fars
- County: Sepidan
- Bakhsh: Beyza
- Rural District: Beyza

Population (2006)
  - Total: 292
- Time zone: UTC+3:30 (IRST)
  - Summer (DST): UTC+4:30 (IRDT)

Hoseynabad-e Sarab (Persian: حسين ابادسراب, also Romanized as Ḩoseynābād-e Sarāb and Ḩoseynābād Sarāb) is a village in Beyza Rural District, Beyza District, Sepidan County, Fars province, Iran. At the 2006 census, its population was 292, in 65 families.
