= Hoseynabad-e Vakil =

Hoseynabad-e Vakil حسين ابادوكيل
- Village
- Location within Iran
- Coordinates: 28°52′51″N 58°50′01″E
- Country: Iran
- Province: Kerman
- County: Fahraj
- Bakhsh: Central
- Rural District: Fahraj

Population (2006)
  - Total: 195
- Time zone: UTC+3:30 (IRST)
  - Summer (DST): UTC+4:30 (IRDT)

Hoseynabad-e Vakil (Persian: حسين ابادوكيل, also Romanized as Ḩoseynābād-e Vakīl) is a village in Fahraj Rural District, in the Central District of Fahraj County, Kerman Province, Iran. At the 2006 census, its population was 195, in 45 families.
