= Hoseynabad-e Saravi =

Hoseynabad-e Saravi حسين ابادسارويي
- Village
- Location within Iran
- Coordinates: 28°50′47″N 52°28′34″E
- Country: Iran
- Province: Fars
- County: Firuzabad
- Bakhsh: Central
- Rural District: Ahmadabad

Population (2006)
  - Total: 126
- Time zone: UTC+3:30 (IRST)
  - Summer (DST): UTC+4:30 (IRDT)

Hoseynabad-e Saravi (Persian: حسين ابادسارويي, also Romanized as Ḩoseynābād-e Sārav’ī; also known as Ḩoseynābād) is a village in Ahmadabad Rural District, in the Central District of Firuzabad County, Fars province, Iran. At the 2006 census, its population was 126, in 28 families.
