= Hoseynabad-e Chulak =

Hoseynabad-e Chulak حسين ابادچولك
- Village
- Location within Iran
- Coordinates: 34°15′46″N 48°16′55″E
- Country: Iran
- Province: Hamadan
- County: Nahavand
- Bakhsh: Central
- Rural District: Tariq ol Eslam

Population (2006)
  - Total: 265
- Time zone: UTC+3:30 (IRST)
  - Summer (DST): UTC+4:30 (IRDT)

Hoseynabad-e Chulak (Persian: حسين ابادچولك, also Romanized as Ḩoseynābād-e Chūlak; also known as Ḩoseynābād) is a village in Tariq ol Eslam Rural District, in the Central District of Nahavand County, Hamadan Province, Iran. At the 2006 census, its population was 265, in 63 families.
