= Hoseynabad-e Nilgun =

Hoseynabad-e Nilgun حسين ابادنيلگون
- Village
- Location within Iran
- Coordinates: 28°17′00″N 61°23′28″E
- Country: Iran
- Province: Sistan and Baluchestan
- County: Khash
- Bakhsh: Central
- Rural District: Poshtkuh

Population (2006)
  - Total: 231
- Time zone: UTC+3:30 (IRST)
  - Summer (DST): UTC+4:30 (IRDT)

Hoseynabad-e Nilgun (Persian: حسين ابادنيلگون, also Romanized as Ḩoseynābād-e Nīlgūn and Ḩoseynābād Nīlgun; also known as Sa‘īnābād) is a village in Poshtkuh Rural District, in the Central District of Khash County, Sistan and Baluchestan Province, Iran. At the 2006 census, its population was 231, in 47 families.
