= Hoseynabad, Kuzaran =

Hoseynabad حسين اباد
- Village
- Location within Iran
- Coordinates: 34°31′10″N 46°43′11″E
- Country: Iran
- Province: Kermanshah
- County: Kermanshah
- Bakhsh: Kuzaran
- Rural District: Sanjabi

Population (2006)
  - Total: 91
- Time zone: UTC+3:30 (IRST)
  - Summer (DST): UTC+4:30 (IRDT)

Hoseynabad (Persian: حسين اباد, also Romanized as Ḩoseynābād) is a village in Sanjabi Rural District, Kuzaran District, Kermanshah County, Kermanshah Province, Iran. At the 2006 census, its population was 91, in 19 families.
