= Hoseynabad-e Shafi Pur =

Hoseynabad-e Shafi Pur حسين ابادشفيع پور
- Village
- Location within Iran
- Coordinates: 31°19′32″N 54°00′47″E
- Country: Iran
- Province: Yazd
- County: Taft
- Bakhsh: Nir
- Rural District: Garizat

Population (2006)
  - Total: 260
- Time zone: UTC+3:30 (IRST)
  - Summer (DST): UTC+4:30 (IRDT)

Hoseynabad-e Shafi Pur (Persian: حسين ابادشفيع پور, also Romanized as Ḩoseynābād–e Shafī‘ Pūr; also known as Ḩoseynābād and ’oseynābād) is a village in Garizat Rural District, Nir District, Taft County, Yazd Province, Iran. At the 2006 census, its population was 260, in 70 families.
