= Hoseynabad-e Posht-e Rud =

Hoseynabad-e Posht-e Rud حسين ابادپشت رود
- Village
- Location within Iran
- Coordinates: 28°57′39″N 58°39′34″E
- Country: Iran
- Province: Kerman
- County: Narmashir
- Bakhsh: Central
- Rural District: Posht Rud

Population (2006)
  - Total: 840
- Time zone: UTC+3:30 (IRST)
  - Summer (DST): UTC+4:30 (IRDT)

Hoseynabad-e Posht-e Rud (Persian: حسين ابادپشت رود, also Romanized as Ḩoseynābād-e Posht-e Rūd; also known as Hosein Abad and Ḩoseynābād) is a village in Posht Rud Rural District, in the Central District of Narmashir County, Kerman Province, Iran. At the 2006 census, its population was 840, in 191 families.
