= Hoseynabad-e Ashkashan =

Hoseynabad-e Ashkashan حسين اباداشكشان
- Village
- Location within Iran
- Coordinates: 32°34′16″N 51°53′19″E
- Country: Iran
- Province: Isfahan
- County: Isfahan
- Bakhsh: Central
- Rural District: Baraan-e Shomali

Population (2006)
  - Total: 440
- Time zone: UTC+3:30 (IRST)
  - Summer (DST): UTC+4:30 (IRDT)

Hoseynabad-e Ashkashan (Persian: حسين اباداشكشان, also Romanized as Ḩoseynābād-e Āshkashān and Ḩoseynābād-e Āshkeshān; also known as Ḩoseynābād) is a village in Baraan-e Shomali Rural District, in the Central District of Isfahan County, Isfahan Province, Iran. At the 2006 census, its population was 440, in 99 families.
