= Hoseynabad-e Sargar =

Hoseynabad-e Sargar حسين ابادسرگر
- Village
- Location within Iran
- Coordinates: 28°45′16″N 52°31′52″E
- Country: Iran
- Province: Fars
- County: Firuzabad
- Bakhsh: Central
- Rural District: Ahmadabad

Population (2006)
  - Total: 197
- Time zone: UTC+3:30 (IRST)
  - Summer (DST): UTC+4:30 (IRDT)

Hoseynabad-e Sargar (Persian: حسين ابادسرگر, also Romanized as Ḩoseynābād-e Sargar) is a village in Ahmadabad Rural District, in the Central District of Firuzabad County, Fars province, Iran. At the 2006 census, its population was 197, in 44 families.
