= Hoseynabad-e Khan Qoli =

Hoseynabad-e Khan Qoli حسين ابادخان قلي
- Village
- Location within Iran
- Coordinates: 29°24′06″N 51°46′38″E
- Country: Iran
- Province: Fars
- County: Kazerun
- Bakhsh: Jereh and Baladeh
- Rural District: Dadin

Population (2006)
  - Total: 273
- Time zone: UTC+3:30 (IRST)
  - Summer (DST): UTC+4:30 (IRDT)

Hoseynabad-e Khan Qoli (Persian: حسين ابادخان قلي, also Romanized as Ḩoseynābād-e Khān Qolī; also known as Ḩoseynābād) is a village in Dadin Rural District, Jereh and Baladeh District, Kazerun County, Fars province, Iran. At the 2006 census, its population was 273, in 54 families.
