= Hoseynabad-e Ghebleh =

Hoseynabad-e Ghebleh حسين اباد قبله
- Village
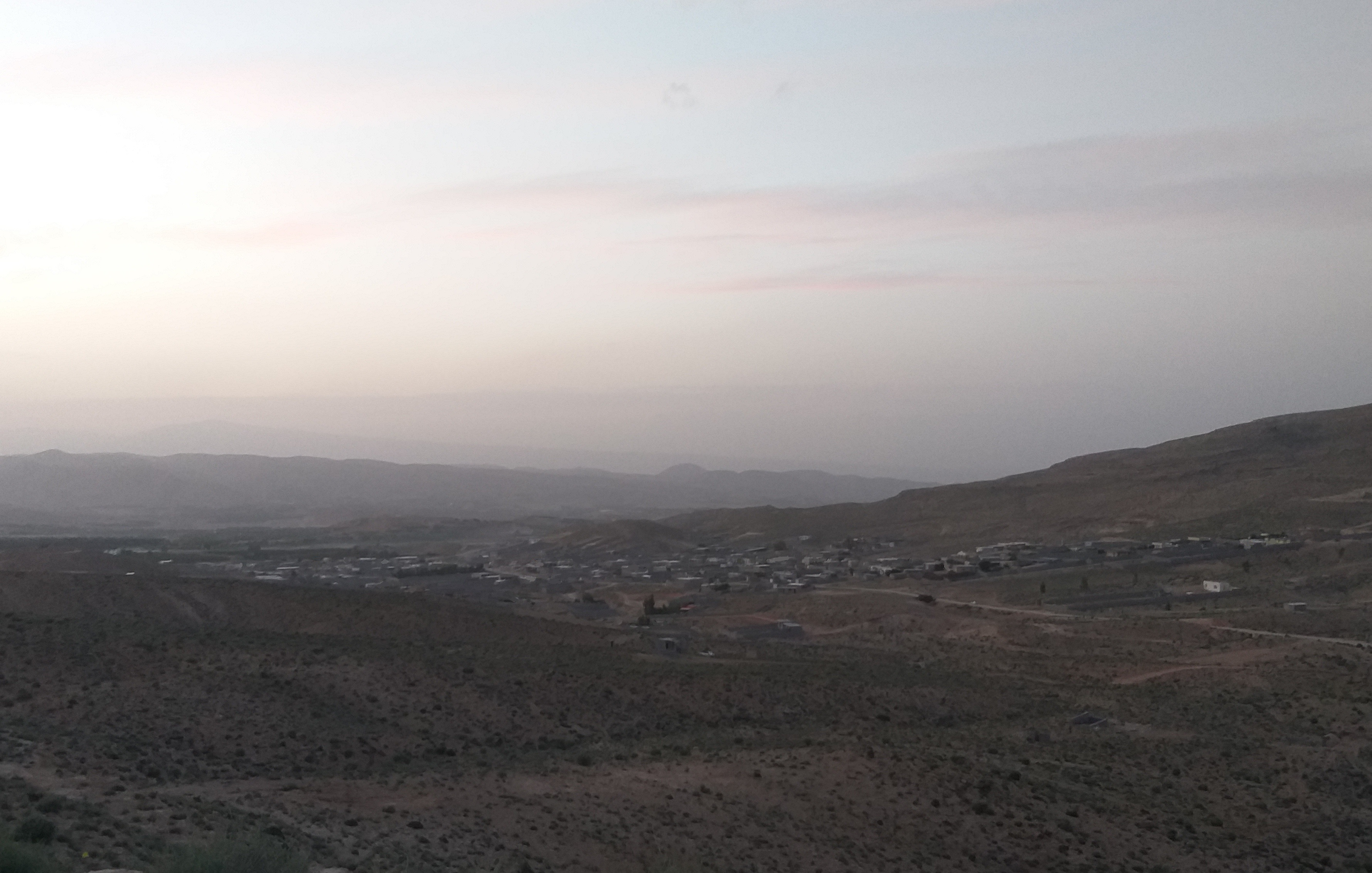

- Location within Iran
- Coordinates: 28°33′51″N 53°34′26″E
- Country: Iran
- Province: Fars
- County: Jahrom
- Bakhsh: Central
- Rural District: Jolgah

Population (2006)
  - Total: 405
- Time zone: UTC+3:30 (IRST)
  - Summer (DST): UTC+4:30 (IRDT)

Hoseynabad-e Ghebleh (Persian: حسين اباد قبله, also Romanized as Ḩoseynābād) is a village in Jolgah Rural District, in the Central District of Jahrom County, Fars province, Iran. At the 2006 census, its population was 405, in 106 families.
