= Hoseynabad, Harazpey-ye Jonubi =

Hoseynabad حسين اباد
- Village
- Location within Iran
- Coordinates: 36°33′42″N 52°26′27″E
- Country: Iran
- Province: Mazandaran
- County: Amol
- Bakhsh: Central
- Rural District: Harazpey-ye Jonubi

Population (2006)
  - Total: 164
- Time zone: UTC+3:30 (IRST)
  - Summer (DST): UTC+4:30 (IRDT)

Hoseynabad (Persian: حسين اباد, also Romanized as Ḩoseynābād) is a village in Harazpey-ye Jonubi Rural District, in the Central District of Amol County, Mazandaran Province, Iran. At the 2006 census, its population was 164, in 48 families.
