= Hoseynabad-e Hajj Kazem =

Hoseynabad-e Hajj Kazem حسين ابادحاج كاظم
- Village
- Location within Iran
- Coordinates: 32°54′48″N 52°44′05″E
- Country: Iran
- Province: Isfahan
- County: Nain
- Bakhsh: Central
- Rural District: Kuhestan

Population (2006)
  - Total: 11
- Time zone: UTC+3:30 (IRST)
  - Summer (DST): UTC+4:30 (IRDT)

Hoseynabad-e Hajj Kazem (Persian: حسين ابادحاج كاظم, also Romanized as Ḩoseynābād-e Ḩājj Kāz̧em) is a village in Kuhestan Rural District, in the Central District of Nain County, Isfahan Province, Iran. At the 2006 census, its population was 11, in 7 families.
