= Hoseynabad, Shirkuh =

Hoseynabad حسين آباد
- Village
- Location within Iran
- Coordinates: 31°36′43″N 54°11′24″E
- Country: Iran
- Province: Yazd
- County: Taft
- Bakhsh: Central
- Rural District: Shirkuh

Population (2006)
  - Total: 17
- Time zone: UTC+3:30 (IRST)
  - Summer (DST): UTC+4:30 (IRDT)

Hoseynabad (Persian: حسين آباد, also Romanized as Ḩoseynābād; also known as ’oseynābād) is a village in Shirkuh Rural District, in the Central District of Taft County, Yazd Province, Iran. At the 2006 census, its population was 17, in 9 families.
