= Hoseynabad, Khonj =

Hoseynabad حسين اباد
- Village
- Location within Iran
- Coordinates: 27°50′07″N 53°36′06″E
- Country: Iran
- Province: Fars
- County: Khonj
- Bakhsh: Central
- Rural District: Tang-e Narak

Population (2006)
  - Total: 464
- Time zone: UTC+3:30 (IRST)
  - Summer (DST): UTC+4:30 (IRDT)

Hoseynabad (Persian: حسين اباد, also Romanized as Ḩoseynābād and Hosein Abad; also known as 'oseynābād) is a village in Tang-e Narak Rural District, in the Central District of Khonj County, Fars province, Iran. At the 2006 census, its population was 464, in 79 families.
