= Hoseynabad-e Miran =

Hoseynabad-e Miran حسين ابادميران
- Village
- Location within Iran
- Coordinates: 32°22′05″N 59°08′45″E
- Country: Iran
- Province: South Khorasan
- County: Khusf
- Bakhsh: Jolgeh-e Mazhan
- Rural District: Qaleh Zari

Population (2006)
  - Total: 48
- Time zone: UTC+3:30 (IRST)
  - Summer (DST): UTC+4:30 (IRDT)

Hoseynabad-e Miran (Persian: حسين ابادميران, also Romanized as Ḩoseynābād-e Mīrān; also known as Ḩoseynābād-e Heyrān) is a village in Qaleh Zari Rural District, Jolgeh-e Mazhan District, Khusf County, South Khorasan Province, Iran. At the 2006 census, its population was 48, in 16 families.
