= Hoseynabad, Bijar =

Hoseynabad حسين آباد
- Village
- Location within Iran
- Coordinates: 36°13′01″N 47°19′51″E
- Country: Iran
- Province: Kurdistan
- County: Bijar
- Bakhsh: Central
- Rural District: Siyah Mansur

Population (2006)
  - Total: 151
- Time zone: UTC+3:30 (IRST)
  - Summer (DST): UTC+4:30 (IRDT)

Hoseynabad (Persian: حسين آباد, also Romanized as Ḩoseynābād) is a village in Siyah Mansur Rural District, in the Central District of Bijar County, Kurdistan province, Iran. At the 2006 census, its population was 151, in 33 families. The village is populated by Kurds.
