= Hoseynabad, Marvast =

Hoseynabad حسين اباد
- Village
- Location within Iran
- Coordinates: 30°18′24″N 54°12′53″E
- Country: Iran
- Province: Yazd
- County: Khatam
- Bakhsh: Marvast
- Rural District: Harabarjan

Population (2006)
  - Total: 37
- Time zone: UTC+3:30 (IRST)
  - Summer (DST): UTC+4:30 (IRDT)

Hoseynabad (Persian: حسين اباد, also Romanized as Ḩoseynābād) is a village in Harabarjan Rural District, Marvast District, Khatam County, Yazd Province, Iran. At the 2006 census, its population was 37, in 21 families.
