= Hoseynabad-e Quri Chay =

Hoseynabad-e Quri Chay حسين ابادقوريچاي
- Village
- Location within Iran
- Coordinates: 34°43′18″N 47°37′05″E
- Country: Iran
- Province: Kermanshah
- County: Sonqor
- Bakhsh: Central
- Rural District: Sarab

Population (2006)
  - Total: 92
- Time zone: UTC+3:30 (IRST)
  - Summer (DST): UTC+4:30 (IRDT)

Hoseynabad-e Quri Chay (Persian: حسين ابادقوريچاي, also Romanized as Ḩoseynābād-e Qūrī Chāy and Ḩoseynābād-e Qūrīchāy) is a village in Sarab Rural District, in the Central District of Sonqor County, Kermanshah Province, Iran. At the 2006 census, its population was 92, in 17 families.
