= Hoseynabad, Qatruyeh =

Hoseynabad حسين اباد
- Village
- Location within Iran
- Coordinates: 29°05′40″N 54°43′05″E
- Country: Iran
- Province: Fars
- County: Neyriz
- Bakhsh: Qatruyeh
- Rural District: Qatruyeh

Population (2006)
  - Total: 12
- Time zone: UTC+3:30 (IRST)
  - Summer (DST): UTC+4:30 (IRDT)

Hoseynabad (Persian: حسين اباد, also Romanized as Ḩoseynābād) is a village in Qatruyeh Rural District, Qatruyeh District, Neyriz County, Fars province, Iran. At the 2006 census, its population was 12, in 4 families.
