= Deh-e Tak =

Deh-e Tak ده تك
- Village
- Location within Iran
- Coordinates: 30°36′30″N 56°09′10″E
- Country: Iran
- Province: Kerman
- County: Rafsanjan
- Bakhsh: Central
- Rural District: Darreh Doran

Population (2006)
  - Total: 15
- Time zone: UTC+3:30 (IRST)
  - Summer (DST): UTC+4:30 (IRDT)

Deh-e Tak (Persian: ده تك, also Romanized as Deh Tak; also known as Deh Tark and Ḩoseynābād) is a village in Darreh Doran Rural District, in the Central District of Rafsanjan County, Kerman Province, Iran. At the 2006 census, its population was 15, in 4 families.
