= Hoseynabad-e Do, Chatrud =

Hoseynabad-e Do حسين اباد2
- Village
- Location within Iran
- Coordinates: 30°28′56″N 56°35′10″E
- Country: Iran
- Province: Kerman
- County: Kerman
- Bakhsh: Chatrud
- Rural District: Kavirat

Population (2006)
  - Total: 25
- Time zone: UTC+3:30 (IRST)
  - Summer (DST): UTC+4:30 (IRDT)

Hoseynabad-e Do (Persian: حسين اباد2, also Romanized as Ḩoseynābād-e Do; also known as Ḩoseynābād and Ḩoseynābād-e Māh Rīnow) is a village in Kavirat Rural District, Chatrud District, Kerman County, Kerman Province, Iran. At the 2006 census, its population was 25, in 4 families.
