= Hoseynabad-e Olya, Lorestan =

Hoseynabad-e Olya حسين ابادعليا
- Village
- Location within Iran
- Coordinates: 34°14′40″N 47°52′04″E
- Country: Iran
- Province: Lorestan
- County: Delfan
- Bakhsh: Kakavand
- Rural District: Kakavand-e Sharqi

Population (2006)
  - Total: 160
- Time zone: UTC+3:30 (IRST)
  - Summer (DST): UTC+4:30 (IRDT)

Hoseynabad-e Olya (Persian: حسين ابادعليا, also Romanized as Ḩoseynābād-e ‘Olyā) is a village in Kakavand-e Sharqi Rural District, Kakavand District, Delfan County, Lorestan Province, Iran. At the 2006 census, its population was 160, in 28 families.
