= Hoseynabad-e Do, Jiroft =

Hoseynabad-e Do حسين اباد2
- Village
- Location within Iran
- Coordinates: 29°08′39″N 57°25′35″E
- Country: Iran
- Province: Kerman
- County: Jiroft
- Bakhsh: Sarduiyeh
- Rural District: Gevar

Population (2006)
  - Total: 20
- Time zone: UTC+3:30 (IRST)
  - Summer (DST): UTC+4:30 (IRDT)

Hoseynabad-e Do (Persian: حسين اباد2, also Romanized as Ḩoseynābād-e Do; also known as Ḩoseynābād) is a village in Gevar Rural District, Sarduiyeh District, Jiroft County, Kerman Province, Iran. At the 2006 census, its population was 20, in 5 families.
