= Hoseynabad-e Akhund, Zarand =

Village in Kerman, Iran

Hoseynabad-e Akhund حسين اباداخوند
- Village
- Location within Iran
- Coordinates: 30°47′26″N 56°29′00″E
- Country: Iran
- Province: Kerman
- County: Zarand
- Bakhsh: Central
- Rural District: Mohammadabad

Population (2006)
  - Total: 552
- Time zone: UTC+3:30 (IRST)
  - Summer (DST): UTC+4:30 (IRDT)

Hoseynabad-e Akhund (Persian: حسين اباداخوند, also Romanized as Ḩoseynābād-e Ākhūnd and Ḩoseynābād Ākhvond; also known as Hosein Abad Akhond and Ḩoseynābād) is a village in Mohammadabad Rural District, in the Central District of Zarand County, Kerman Province, Iran. At the 2006 census, its population was 552, in 139 families.
