= Hoseynabad-e Khan, Narmashir =

Hoseynabad-e Khan حسين ابادخان
- Village
- Location within Iran
- Coordinates: 28°48′40″N 58°52′03″E
- Country: Iran
- Province: Kerman
- County: Narmashir
- Bakhsh: Central
- Rural District: Posht Rud

Population (2006)
  - Total: 104
- Time zone: UTC+3:30 (IRST)
  - Summer (DST): UTC+4:30 (IRDT)

Hoseynabad-e Khan (Persian: حسين ابادخان, also Romanized as Ḩoseynābād-e Khān; also known as Hosein Abad, Ḩoseynābād, and Ḩoseynābād-e Behzādī) is a village in Posht Rud Rural District, in the Central District of Narmashir County, Kerman Province, Iran. At the 2006 census, its population was 104, in 27 families.
