= Hussainabad =

Hussainabad or Husainabad (Persian: حسین آباد) may refer to:

== Azerbaijan ==
- Hüseynabad, Azerbaijan

== India ==
- Hussainabad block, which includes Hussainabad (Jharkhand)
  - Hussainabad, Jharkhand, town
  - Hussainabad Assembly constituency
- Husainabad, Jalandhar, Punjab, India
- Hussainabad, Kapurthala, Punjab, India
- Husainabad, Raebareli, a village in Raebareli district of Uttar Pradesh
- Husainabad Clock Tower, Lucknow

== Iran ==
- Hussainabad, Iran
- Hussainabad, Dorud, Iran
- Hosenabad-e Pain, Iran
- Hoseynabad-e Ali Akbarkhan, Iran
- Hoseynabad-e Mish Mast, Iran
- Hoseynabad-e Amini, Iran
- Hoseynabad, Abhar, Iran
- Hoseynabad, Arsanjan, Iran
- Hoseynabad, Asadabad, Iran
- Hoseynabad, Bagh Safa, Iran
- Hoseynabad, Bahar, Iran
- Hoseynabad, Dehgolan, Iran
- Hoseynabad, Ferdows, Rafsanjan, Iran
- Hoseynabad, Halil, Iran
- Hoseynabad, Hendijan, Iran
- Hoseynabad, Heris, Iran
- Hoseynabad, Jarqavieh Sofla, Iran
- Hoseynabad, Kashan, Iran
- Hoseynabad, Kavirat, Iran
- Hoseynabad, Khodabandeh, Iran
- Hoseynabad, Komijan, Iran
- Hoseynabad, Nahavand, Iran
- Hoseynabad, Najafabad, Iran
- Hoseynabad, Saduq, Iran
- Hoseynabad, Sanandaj, Iran
- Hoseynabad, Saveh, Iran
- Hoseynabad, Kuhin, Iran
- Hoseynabad, Malekan, Iran
- Husainabad, Sarband, Iran
- Husainabad, Zalian, Iran
- Hoseynabad, Tarom Sofla, Iran
- Hoseynabad, Takestan, Iran
- Hoseynabad, Tiran and Karvan, Iran
- Hoseynabad (31°05′ N 53°20′ E), Abarkuh, Iran
- Hoseynabad-e Akhund, Kerman, Iran
- Hoseynabad-e Alizadeh, Iran
- Hoseynabad-e Asheq, Iran
- Hoseynabad-e Baba Khanjar, Iran
- Hoseynabad-e Derakhti, Iran
- Hoseynabad-e Do, Sirjan, Iran
- Hoseynabad-e Dula, Iran
- Hoseynabad-e Gorgan, Iran
- Hoseynabad-e Hajji Ali Naqi, Iran
- Hoseynabad-e Jarandaq, Iran
- Hoseynabad-e Khan, Sar Asiab-e Farsangi, Iran
- Hoseynabad-e Deh Boneh, Iran
- Hoseynabad-e Gavahi, Iran
- Hoseynabad-e Ghinab, Iran
- Hoseynabad-e Jadid, Iran
- Hoseynabad-e Latka, Iran
- Hoseynabad-e Nazem, Iran
- Hoseynabad-e Pur Akbari, Iran
- Hoseynabad-e Sarzeh, Iran
- Hoseynabad-e Shamlu, Iran
- Hoseynabad-e Rashtkhvar, Iran
- Hoseynabad-e Zarand, Iran
- Hoseynabad, Behbahan, Iran
- Hoseynabad, Jam, Iran
- Kani Hoseynbag, Iran
- Qavamiyeh, Iran

== Pakistan ==
- Hussainabad (Sindh), Pakistan
- Hussainabad (Hunza), Pakistan
- Hussainabad (Karachi), Pakistan
- Hussainabad (Bhawana), Pakistan
- Hussainabad (Skardu), Gilgit-Baltistan, Pakistan

== See also ==
- Hoseynabad (disambiguation)
- Husainpur (disambiguation)
