= Amiriyeh (disambiguation) =

Amiriyeh is a city in Semnan Province, Iran.

Amiriyeh (Persian: كهنك) may also refer to:

- Amiriyeh, Hamadan, a village in Razan County, Hamadan Province, Iran
- Amiriyeh, Kerman, a village in Narmashir County, Kerman Province, Iran
- Amiriyeh, Shahdad, a village in Kerman County, Kerman Province, Iran
- Amiriyeh, Sirjan, a village in Sirjan County, Kerman Province, Iran
- Amiriyeh, Khuzestan, a village in Ahvaz County, Khuzestan Province, Iran
- Amiriyeh, Markazi, a village in Khomeyn County, Markazi Province, Iran
- Amiriyeh, North Khorasan, a village in Shirvan County, North Khorasan Province, Iran
- Amiriyeh, Razavi Khorasan, a village in Bajestan County, Razavi Khorasan Province, Iran
- Amiriyeh, Shahrud, a village in Shahrud County, Semnan Province, Iran
- Amiriyeh, Firuzkuh, a village in Firuzkuh County, Tehran Province, Iran
- Amiriyeh, Malard, a village in Malard County, Tehran Province, Iran
- Amiriyeh Rural District, in Markazi Province, Iran
