= Dehak =

Dehak or Dehik or Dehek or Dihik or Dahak (Persian: دهك) may refer to various places in Iran:

- Dehak, Bushehr
- Dehak, Arsanjan, Fars Province
- Dehak-e Aliabad, Arsanjan County, Fars Province
- Dehak, Shiraz, Fars Province
- Dehak, Isfahan
- Dehak, Mazandaran
- Dehik, North Khorasan
- Dehak, Qazvin
- Dehak, Sistan and Baluchestan
- Dehak, South Khorasan
- Dehik, South Khorasan
- Dehak, Tehran

== See also ==
- Dahak (disambiguation)
