= Hesar-e Shalpush =

Village in Tehran province, Iran

Hesar-e Shalpush Persian: حصارشالپوش
- Village
- Location within Iran
- Coordinates: 35°37′04″N 50°56′41″E
- Country: Iran
- Province: Tehran
- County: Malard
- District: Central
- Rural District: Malard-e Jonubi

Population (2016)
  - Total: 355
- Time zone: UTC+3:30 (IRST)

Hesar-e Shalpush (Persian: حصارشالپوش) (Note: Also romanized as Ḩeşār-e Shālpūsh; also known as Ḩeşār and Qal‘eh-ye Bālā) is a village in Malard-e Jonubi Rural District of the Central District in Malard County, Tehran province, Iran.

== Demographics ==
=== Population ===
At the time of the 2006 National Census, the village's population was 324 in 80 households, when it was in Malard Rural District (Note: Renamed Malard-e Shomali Rural District) of the former Malard District in Shahriar County. The following census in 2011 counted 381 people in 109 households, by which time the district had been separated from the county in the establishment of Malard County. The rural district was transferred to the new Central District and renamed Malard-e Shomali Rural District. Hesar-e Shalpush was transferred to Malard-e Jonubi Rural District created in the district. The 2016 census measured the population of the village as 355 people in 110 households.
