= Bid Kaneh =

Village in Tehran province, Iran

Bid Kaneh Persian: بيدكنه
- Village
- Location within Iran
- Coordinates: 35°37′40″N 50°55′26″E
- Country: Iran
- Province: Tehran
- County: Malard
- District: Central
- Rural District: Malard-e Jonubi

Population (2016)
  - Total: 6,193
- Time zone: UTC+3:30 (IRST)

Bid Kaneh (Persian: بيدكنه) (Note: Also romanized as Bīd Kaneh; also known as Bīdganeh and Bīdgeneh) is a village in, and the capital of, Malard-e Jonubi Rural District in the Central District of Malard County, Tehran province, Iran.

== Demographics ==
=== Population ===
At the time of the 2006 National Census, the village's population was 5,640 in 1,467 households, when it was in Malard Rural District (Note: Renamed Malard-e Shomali Rural District) of the former Malard District in Shahriar County. The following census in 2011 counted 6,009 people in 1,665 households, by which time the district had been separated from the county in the establishment of Malard County. The rural district was transferred to the new Central District and renamed Malard-e Shomali Rural District. Bid Kaneh was transferred to Malard-e Jonubi Rural District created in the district. The 2016 census measured the population of the village as 6,193 people in 1,845 households. It was the most populous village in its rural district.

== Arsenal explosion ==
Bid Kaneh arsenal explosion was a large explosion that occurred about 13:30 local time, 12 November 2011 in Iran's Moddares garrison missile base.
