= Hajjiabad-e Sofla =

Village in Tehran province, Iran

Hajjiabad-e Sofla Persian: حاجي ابادسفلي
- Village
- Location within Iran
- Coordinates: 35°35′10″N 50°48′29″E
- Country: Iran
- Province: Tehran
- County: Malard
- District: Safadasht
- Rural District: Akhtarabad

Population (2016)
  - Total: 241
- Time zone: UTC+3:30 (IRST)

Hajjiabad-e Sofla (Persian: حاجي ابادسفلي) (Note: Also romanized as Ḩājjīābād-e Soflá; also known as Ḩājjīābād) is a village in Akhtarabad Rural District of Safadasht District in Malard County, Tehran province, Iran.

== Demographics ==
=== Population ===
At the time of the 2006 National Census, the village's population was 208 in 49 households, when it was in the former Malard District of Shahriar County. The following census in 2011 counted 221 people in 57 households, by which time the district had been separated from the county in the establishment of Malard County. The rural district was transferred to the new Safadasht District. The 2016 census measured the population of the village as 241 people in 72 households.
