= Amirabad, Tehran =

Village in Tehran province, Iran

Amirabad Persian: اميراباد
- Village
- Location within Iran
- Coordinates: 35°40′50″N 50°47′42″E
- Country: Iran
- Province: Tehran
- County: Malard
- District: Safadasht
- Rural District: Bibi Sakineh

Population (2016)
  - Total: 5,221
- Time zone: UTC+3:30 (IRST)

Amirabad (Persian: اميراباد) (Note: Also romanized as Amīrābād; also known as Shahrak-e Amīrābād) is a village in Bibi Sakineh Rural District of Safadasht District in Malard County, Tehran province, Iran.

== Demographics ==
=== Population ===
At the time of the 2006 National Census, the village's population was 5,042 in 1,212 households, when it was in the former Malard District of Shahriar County. The following census in 2011 counted 5,506 people in 1,491 households, by which time the district had been separated from the county in the establishment of Malard County. The rural district was transferred to the new Safadasht District. The 2016 census measured the population of the village as 5,221 people in 1,458 households. It was the most populous village in its rural district.
