= Argheshabad =

Village in Tehran province, Iran

Argheshabad Persian: ارغش اباد
- Village
- Location within Iran
- Coordinates: 35°41′56″N 50°46′24″E
- Country: Iran
- Province: Tehran
- County: Malard
- District: Safadasht
- Rural District: Bibi Sakineh

Population (2016)
  - Total: 631
- Time zone: UTC+3:30 (IRST)

Argheshabad (Persian: ارغش اباد) (Note: Also romanized as Argheshābād; also known as Ebrāhīmābād) is a village in Bibi Sakineh Rural District of Safadasht District in Malard County, Tehran province, Iran.

== Demographics ==
=== Population ===
At the time of the 2006 National Census, the village's population was 559 in 147 households, when it was in the former Malard District of Shahriar County. The following census in 2011 counted 634 people in 186 households, by which time the district had been separated from the county in the establishment of Malard County. The rural district was transferred to the new Safadasht District. The 2016 census measured the population of the village as 631 people in 196 households.
