= Esfandabad, Tehran =

Village in Tehran province, Iran

Esfandabad Persian: اسفنداباد
- Village
- Location within Iran
- Coordinates: 35°38′18″N 50°56′18″E
- Country: Iran
- Province: Tehran
- County: Malard
- District: Central
- Rural District: Malard-e Jonubi

Population (2016)
  - Total: 3,311
- Time zone: UTC+3:30 (IRST)

Esfandabad (Persian: اسفنداباد) (Note: Also romanized as Esfandābād) is a village in Malard-e Jonubi Rural District of the Central District in Malard County, Tehran province, Iran.

== Demographics ==
=== Population ===
At the time of the 2006 National Census, the village's population was 2,785 in 681 households, when it was in Malard Rural District (Note: Renamed Malard-e Shomali Rural District) of the former Malard District in Shahriar County. The following census in 2011 counted 3,055 people in 836 households, by which time the district had been separated from the county in the establishment of Malard County. The rural district was transferred to the new Central District and renamed Malard-e Shomali Rural District. Esfandabad was transferred to Malard-e Jonubi Rural District created in the district. The 2016 census measured the population of the village as 3,311 people in 967 households.
