= Salehabad-e Hesar-e Shalpush =

Village in Tehran province, Iran

Salehabad-e Hesar-e Shalpush Persian: صالح ابادحصارشالپوش
- Village
- Location within Iran
- Coordinates: 35°36′26″N 50°56′57″E
- Country: Iran
- Province: Tehran
- County: Malard
- District: Central
- Rural District: Malard-e Jonubi

Population (2016)
  - Total: 423
- Time zone: UTC+3:30 (IRST)

Salehabad-e Hesar-e Shalpush (Persian: صالح ابادحصارشالپوش) (Note: Also romanized as Şāleḩābād-e Ḩeşār-e Shālpūsh; also known as Şāleḩābād and Şāleḩābād-e Şādeq) is a village in Malard-e Jonubi Rural District of the Central District in Malard County, Tehran province, Iran.

== Demographics ==
=== Population ===
At the time of the 2006 National Census, the village's population was 350 in 98 households, when it was in Malard Rural District (Note: Renamed Malard-e Shomali Rural District) of the former Malard District in Shahriar County. The following census in 2011 counted 323 people in 90 households, by which time the district had been separated from the county in the establishment of Malard County. The rural district was transferred to the new Central District and renamed Malard-e Shomali Rural District. Salehabad-e Hesar-e Shalpush was transferred to Malard-e Jonubi Rural District created in the district. The 2016 census measured the population of the village as 423 people in 116 households.
