= Akramabad =

Akramabad (Persian: اكرم اباد) may refer to:

- Akramabad, East Azerbaijan
- Akramabad, Kerman
- Akramabad, Sistan and Baluchestan
- Akramabad, Tehran
- Akramabad, Yazd
