= Husainpur =

Husainpur or Hussainpur may refer to the following places in India:

- Husainpur, Bewar, a village in Mainpuri district, Uttar Pradesh
- Husainpur, Firozabad, a village in Uttar Pradesh
- Husainpur, Kishni, a village in Mainpuri district, Uttar Pradesh
- Husainpur, Sultanganj, a village in Mainpuri district, Uttar Pradesh
- Hussainpur, a census town in Jalandhar district, Punjab
- Hussainpur, Bhulath, a village in Punjab
- Hussainpur, SBS Nagar, a village in Shaheed Bhagat Singh Nagar district, Punjab
- Hossainpur Upazila, Bangladesh

== See also ==
- Hussainpura, a village in Ludhiana district, Punjab
- Hussainabad (disambiguation)
