= Arastu =

Village in Tehran province, Iran

Arastu Persian: ارسطو
- Village
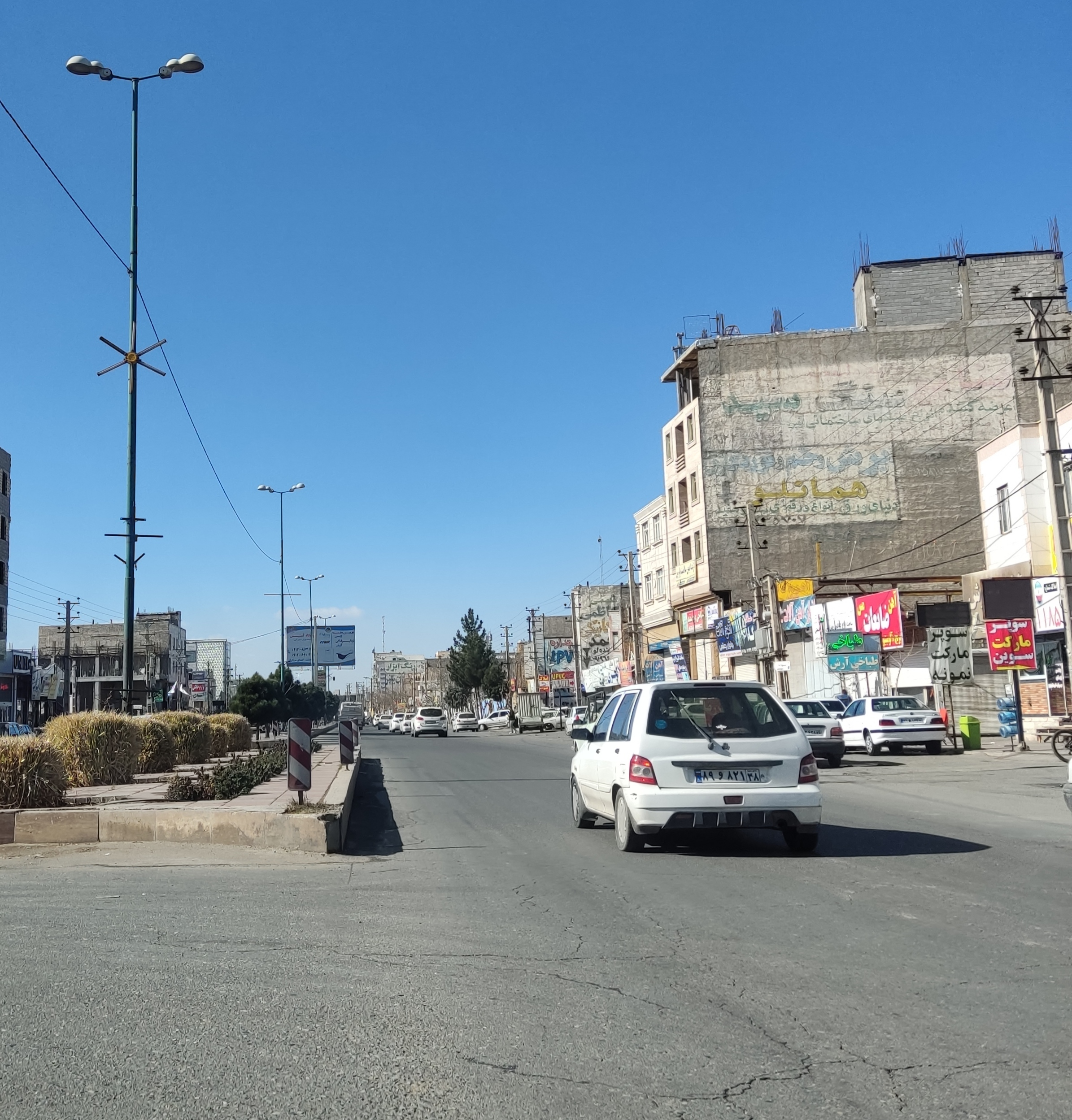
- The village of Arastu

- Location within Iran
- Coordinates: 35°41′18″N 50°52′39″E
- Country: Iran
- Province: Tehran
- County: Malard
- District: Safadasht
- Rural District: Bibi Sakineh

Population (2016)
  - Total: 1,034
- Time zone: UTC+3:30 (IRST)

Arastu (Persian: ارسطو) (Note: Also romanized as Arasţū; also known as Estūr and Ostūr) is a village in Bibi Sakineh Rural District of Safadasht District in Malard County, Tehran province, Iran.

== Demographics ==
=== Population ===
At the time of the 2006 National Census, the village's population was 971 in 249 households, when it was in the former Malard District of Shahriar County. The following census in 2011 counted 1,048 people in 297 households, by which time the district had been separated from the county in the establishment of Malard County. The rural district was transferred to the new Safadasht District. The 2016 census measured the population of the village as 1,034 people in 309 households.
