= Akhtarabad =

Village in Tehran province, Iran

Akhtarabad Persian: اختراباد
- Village
- Location within Iran
- Coordinates: 35°35′32″N 50°35′46″E
- Country: Iran
- Province: Tehran
- County: Malard
- District: Safadasht
- Rural District: Akhtarabad

Population (2016)
  - Total: 430
- Time zone: UTC+3:30 (IRST)

Akhtarabad (Persian: اختراباد) (Note: Also romanized as Akhtarābād; also known as Z̧olmābād) is a village in, and the capital of, Akhtarabad Rural District in Safadasht District of Malard County, Tehran province, Iran.

== Demographics ==
=== Population ===
At the time of the 2006 National Census, the village's population was 498 in 134 households, when it was in the former Malard District of Shahriar County. The following census in 2011 counted 561 people in 129 households, by which time the district had been separated from the county in the establishment of Malard County. The rural district was transferred to the new Safadasht District. The 2016 census measured the population of the village as 430 people in 135 households. It was the most populous village in its rural district.
