= Guy Bolagh =

Village in Tehran province, Iran

Guy Bolagh Persian: گوي بلاغ
- Village
- Location within Iran
- Coordinates: 35°37′41″N 50°24′23″E
- Country: Iran
- Province: Tehran
- County: Malard
- District: Safadasht
- Rural District: Akhtarabad

Population (2016)
  - Total: 147
- Time zone: UTC+3:30 (IRST)

Guy Bolagh (Persian: گوي بلاغ) (Note: Also romanized as Gūy Bolāgh) is a village in Akhtarabad Rural District of Safadasht District in Malard County, Tehran province, Iran.

== Demographics ==
=== Population ===
At the time of the 2006 National Census, the village's population was 147 in 28 households, when it was in the former Malard District of Shahriar County. The following census in 2011 counted 129 people in 27 households, by which time the district had been separated from the county in the establishment of Malard County. The rural district was transferred to the new Safadasht District. The 2016 census measured the population of the village as 147 people in 42 households.
