= Mahmudabad, Malard =

Village in Tehran province, Iran

Mahmudabad Persian: محموداباد
- Village
- Location within Iran
- Coordinates: 35°35′32″N 50°47′25″E
- Country: Iran
- Province: Tehran
- County: Malard
- District: Safadasht
- Rural District: Akhtarabad

Population (2016)
  - Total: 105
- Time zone: UTC+3:30 (IRST)

Mahmudabad (Persian: محموداباد) (Note: Also romanized as Maḩmūdābād; also known as Muhammadābād) is a village in Akhtarabad Rural District of Safadasht District in Malard County, Tehran province, Iran.

== Demographics ==
=== Population ===
At the time of the 2006 National Census, the village's population was 134 in 36 households, when it was in the former Malard District of Shahriar County. The following census in 2011 counted 135 people in 39 households, by which time the district had been separated from the county in the establishment of Malard County. The rural district was transferred to the new Safadasht District. The 2016 census measured the population of the village as 105 people in 33 households.
