= Mohammadabad, Malard =

Village in Tehran province, Iran

Mohammadabad Persian: محمداباد
- Village
- Location within Iran
- Coordinates: 35°38′57″N 50°31′49″E
- Country: Iran
- Province: Tehran
- County: Malard
- District: Safadasht
- Rural District: Akhtarabad

Population (2016)
  - Total: 155
- Time zone: UTC+3:30 (IRST)

Mohammadabad (Persian: محمداباد) (Note: Also romanized as Moḩammadābād) is a village in Akhtarabad Rural District of Safadasht District in Malard County, Tehran province, Iran.

== Demographics ==
=== Population ===
At the time of the 2006 National Census, the village's population was 130 in 24 households, when it was in the former Malard District of Shahriar County. The following census in 2011 counted 141 people in 32 households, by which time the district had been separated from the county in the establishment of Malard County. The rural district was transferred to the new Safadasht District. The 2016 census measured the population of the village as 155 people in 37 households.
