= Kushkak, Tehran =

Village in Tehran province, Iran

Kushkak Persian: كوشكك
- Village
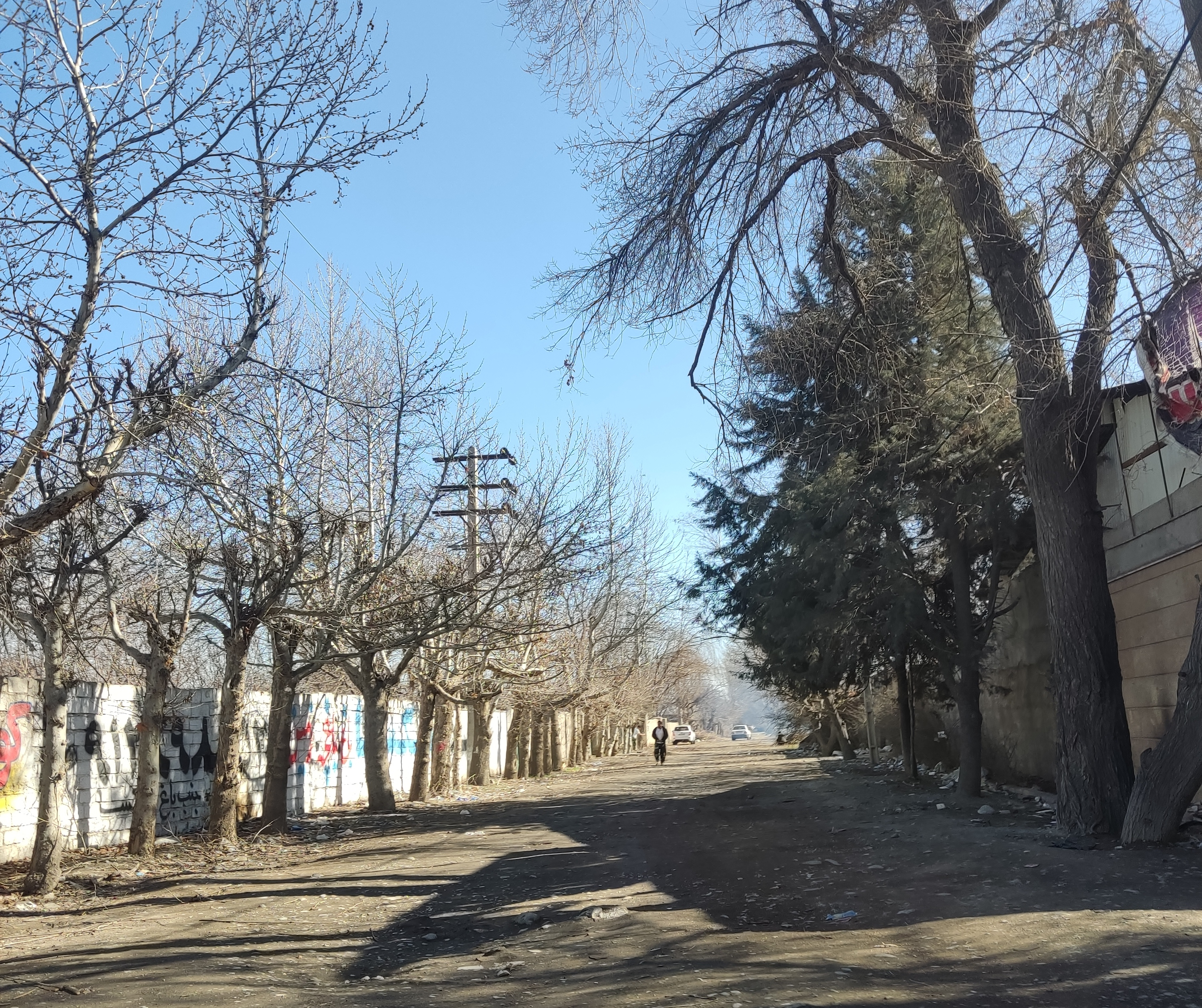
- The village of Kushkak

- Location within Iran
- Coordinates: 35°41′16″N 50°54′35″E
- Country: Iran
- Province: Tehran
- County: Malard
- District: Safadasht
- Rural District: Bibi Sakineh

Population (2016)
  - Total: 1,070
- Time zone: UTC+3:30 (IRST)

Kushkak (Persian: كوشكك) (Note: Also romanized as Kūshkak) is a village in Bibi Sakineh Rural District of Safadasht District in Malard County, Tehran province, Iran.

== Demographics ==
=== Population ===
At the time of the 2006 National Census, the village's population was 788 in 197 households, when it was in the former Malard District of Shahriar County. The following census in 2011 counted 992 people in 288 households, by which time the district had been separated from the county in the establishment of Malard County. The rural district was transferred to the new Safadasht District. The 2016 census measured the population of the village as 1,070 people in 307 households.
