= Gomorgan =

Village in Tehran province, Iran

Gomorgan Persian: گمرگان
- Village
- Location within Iran
- Coordinates: 35°40′01″N 50°38′11″E
- Country: Iran
- Province: Tehran
- County: Malard
- District: Safadasht
- Rural District: Akhtarabad

Population (2016)
  - Total: 211
- Time zone: UTC+3:30 (IRST)

Gomorgan (Persian: گمرگان) (Note: Also romanized as Gomargān and Gomorgān; also known as Gomarkān, Gomorkān, Gomrokān, and Gūmargan) is a village in Akhtarabad Rural District of Safadasht District in Malard County, Tehran province, Iran.

== Demographics ==
=== Population ===
At the time of the 2006 National Census, the village's population was 270 in 68 households, when it was in the former Malard District of Shahriar County. The following census in 2011 counted 208 people in 55 households, by which time the district had been separated from the county in the establishment of Malard County. The rural district was transferred to the new Safadasht District. The 2016 census measured the population of the village as 211 people in 55 households.
