= Yusefabad-e Qavam =

Village in Tehran province, Iran

Yusefabad-e Qavam Persian: يوسف ابادقوام
- Village
- Location within Iran
- Coordinates: 35°40′42″N 50°54′09″E
- Country: Iran
- Province: Tehran
- County: Malard
- District: Safadasht
- Rural District: Bibi Sakineh

Population (2016)
  - Total: 4,895
- Time zone: UTC+3:30 (IRST)

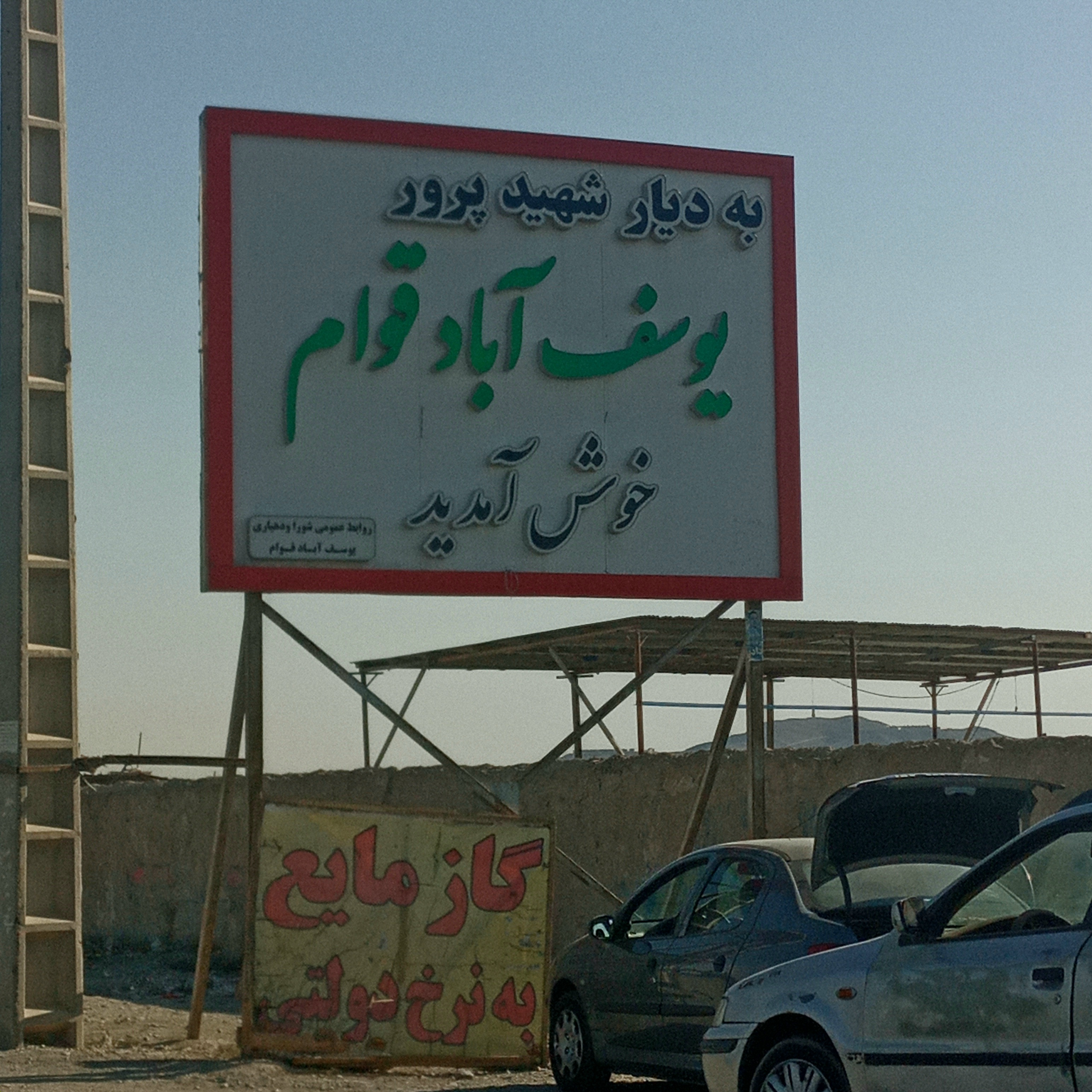
Yousef Abad Qavam

Yusefabad-e Qavam (Persian: يوسف ابادقوام) (Note: Also romanized as Yūsefābād-e Qavām; also known as Yūsefābād) is a village in Bibi Sakineh Rural District of Safadasht District in Malard County, Tehran province, Iran.

== Demographics ==
=== Population ===
At the time of the 2006 National Census, the village's population was 4,158 in 991 households, when it was in the former Malard District of Shahriar County. The following census in 2011 counted 4,671 people in 1,225 households, by which time the district had been separated from the county in the establishment of Malard County. The rural district was transferred to the new Safadasht District. The 2016 census measured the population of the village as 4,895 people in 1,360 households.
