= Ali Bayat =

Village in Tehran province, Iran

Ali Bayat Persian: علي بيات
- Village
- Location within Iran
- Coordinates: 35°41′08″N 50°46′43″E
- Country: Iran
- Province: Tehran
- County: Malard
- District: Safadasht
- Rural District: Bibi Sakineh

Population (2016)
  - Total: 777
- Time zone: UTC+3:30 (IRST)

Ali Bayat (Persian: علی بیات) (Note: Also romanized as ‘Ali Bayat) is a village in Bibi Sakineh Rural District of Safadasht District in Malard County, Tehran province, Iran.

== Demographics ==
=== Population ===
At the time of the 2006 National Census, the village's population was 546 in 142 households, when it was in the former Malard District of Shahriar County. The following census in 2011 counted 632 people in 179 households, by which time the district had been separated from the county in the establishment of Malard County. The rural district was transferred to the new Safadasht District. The 2016 census measured the population of the village as 777 people in 231 households.
