= Qeshlaq-e Amirabad, Tehran =

Village in Tehran province, Iran

Qeshlaq-e Amirabad Persian: قشلاق اميراباد
- Village
- Location within Iran
- Coordinates: 35°36′11″N 50°30′26″E
- Country: Iran
- Province: Tehran
- County: Malard
- District: Safadasht
- Rural District: Akhtarabad

Population (2016)
  - Total: 309
- Time zone: UTC+3:30 (IRST)

Qeshlaq-e Amirabad (Persian: قشلاق اميراباد) (Note: Also romanized as Qeshlāq-e Āmīrābād; also known as Āmīrābād) is a village in Akhtarabad Rural District of Safadasht District in Malard County, Tehran province, Iran.

== Demographics ==
=== Population ===
At the time of the 2006 National Census, the village's population was 322 in 60 households, when it was in the former Malard District of Shahriar County. The following census in 2011 counted 317 people in 76 households, by which time the district had been separated from the county in the establishment of Malard County. The rural district was transferred to the new Safadasht District. The 2016 census measured the population of the village as 309 people in 87 households.
