= Dahak =

Dahak may refer to:

== Places ==
- Dehak, Isfahan or Dahak, Isfahan
- Dehak, Tehran or Dahak, Tehran

== People ==
- Driss Dahak (born 1939), Moroccan diplomat

== Mythology ==
- Zahhak, an evil figure from Persian mythology
- Dahak, a demon in Zoroastrianism, see List of theological demons

== Fictional characters ==
- Dahak, a character from the Xena/Hercules fictional universe
- Dahak, a character from David Weber's Dahak-series
- Dahak, the robot belonging to Red Savarin from Solatorobo: Red the Hunter

== See also ==
- Dehak (disambiguation)
