= Chaqu =

Chaqu (Persian: چاقو) may refer to:

- Chaqu-ye Akhvani
- Chaqu-ye Bala
