= Shahrak-e Jafariyeh =

Village in Tehran province, Iran

Shahrak-e Jafariyeh Persian: شهرک جعفریه
- Village
- Location within Iran
- Coordinates: 35°39′42″N 50°59′41″E
- Country: Iran
- Province: Tehran
- County: Malard
- District: Central
- Rural District: Malard-e Shomali

Population (2016)
  - Total: 9,452
- Time zone: UTC+3:30 (IRST)

Shahrak-e Jafariyeh (Persian: شهرک جعفریه) (Note: Also romanized as Shahrak-e Ja‘farīyeh; also known as Ja‘farīyeh) is a village in Malard-e Shomali Rural District (Note: Formerly Malard Rural District) of the Central District in Malard County, Tehran province, Iran.

== Demographics ==
=== Population ===
At the time of the 2006 National Census, the village's population was 7,856 in 1,933 households, when it was in Ferdows Rural District of the Central District in Shahriar County. The following census in 2011 counted 10,788 people in 2,936 households, by which time the village had been separated from the county in the establishment of Malard County. Shahrak-e Jafariyeh was transferred to Malard-e Shomali Rural District in the new Central District. It was the most populous village in its rural district.
