= Chaqu-ye Bala =

Chaqu-ye Bala چاقوبالا
- Village
- Location within Iran
- Coordinates: 35°37′57″N 50°39′31″E
- Country: Iran
- Province: Tehran
- County: Malard
- Bakhsh: Central
- Rural District: Akhtarabad

Population (2006)
  - Total: 21
- Time zone: UTC+3:30 (IRST)
  - Summer (DST): UTC+4:30 (IRDT)

Chaqu-ye Bala (Persian: چاقوبالا, also Romanized as Chāqū-ye Bālā and Chāqū Bālā; also known as Chāqū and Chāqū-ye Pā’īn) is a village in Akhtarabad Rural District, in the Central District of Malard County, Tehran province, Iran. At the 2006 census, its population was 21, in 7 families.
