= Akramabad-e Kianpur =

Akramabad-e Kianpur اكرم ابادكيانپور
- Village
- Location within Iran
- Coordinates: 35°33′03″N 50°40′50″E
- Country: Iran
- Province: Tehran
- County: Malard
- Bakhsh: Central
- Rural District: Akhtarabad

Population (2006)
  - Total: 59
- Time zone: UTC+3:30 (IRST)
  - Summer (DST): UTC+4:30 (IRDT)

Akramabad-e Kianpur (Persian: اكرم ابادكيانپور, also Romanized as Akramābād-e Kīānpūr) is a village in Akhtarabad Rural District, in the Central District of Malard County, Tehran Province, Iran. At the 2006 census, its population was 59, in 19 families.
