= Aq Qui, Tehran =

Aq Qui اق قويي
- Village
- Location within Iran
- Coordinates: 35°39′14″N 50°30′14″E
- Country: Iran
- Province: Tehran
- County: Malard
- Bakhsh: Central
- Rural District: Akhtarabad

Population (2006)
  - Total: 21
- Time zone: UTC+3:30 (IRST)
  - Summer (DST): UTC+4:30 (IRDT)

Aq Qui (Persian: اق قويي, also Romanized as Āq Qū'ī and Āgh Qū’ī) is a village in Akhtarabad Rural District, in the Central District of Malard County, Tehran Province, Iran. At the 2006 census, its population was 21, in 5 families.
