= Chaqu-ye Akhvani =

Village in Tehran province, Iran

Chaqu-ye Akhvani Persian: چاقواخواني
- Village
- Location within Iran
- Coordinates: 35°37′57″N 50°40′30″E
- Country: Iran
- Province: Tehran
- County: Malard
- District: Safadasht
- Rural District: Akhtarabad

Population (2016)
  - Total: 151
- Time zone: UTC+3:30 (IRST)

Chaqu-ye Akhvani (Persian: چاقواخواني) (Note: Also romanized as Chāqū-ye Ākhvānī; also known as Chaqu-ye Akhvani-ye Pain) is a village in Akhtarabad Rural District of Safadasht District in Malard County, Tehran province, Iran.

== Demographics ==
=== Population ===
At the time of the 2006 National Census, the village's population was 195 in 50 households, when it was in the former Malard District of Shahriar County. The following census in 2011 counted 149 people in 40 households, by which time the district had been separated from the county in the establishment of Malard County. The rural district was transferred to the new Safadasht District. The 2016 census measured the population of the village as 151 people in 42 households.
