= Qeshlaq-e Malard =

Village in Tehran province, Iran

Qeshlaq-e Malard Persian: قشلاق ملارد
- Village
- Location within Iran
- Coordinates: 35°38′34″N 50°58′41″E
- Country: Iran
- Province: Tehran
- County: Malard
- District: Central
- Rural District: Malard-e Shomali

Population (2016)
  - Total: 5,110
- Time zone: UTC+3:30 (IRST)

Qeshlaq-e Malard (Persian: قشلاق ملارد) (Note: Also romanized as Qeshlāq-e Malārd) is a village in Malard-e Shomali Rural District (Note: Formerly Malard Rural District) of the Central District in Malard County, Tehran province, Iran.

== Demographics ==
=== Population ===
At the time of the 2006 National Census, the village's population was 3,340 in 838 households, when it was in Malard Rural District (Note: Renamed Malard-e Shomali Rural District) of the Central District in Shahriar County. The following census in 2011 counted 4,504 people in 1,226 households, by which time the rural district had been separated from the county in the establishment of Malard County. The rural district was transferred to the new Central District and renamed Malard-e Shomali Rural District. The 2016 census measured the population of the village as 5,110 people in 1,452 households.
