= Khvoshnam, Tehran =

Village in Tehran province, Iran

Khvoshnam Persian: خوشنام
- Village
- Location within Iran
- Coordinates: 35°41′52″N 50°56′16″E
- Country: Iran
- Province: Tehran
- County: Malard
- District: Central
- Rural District: Malard-e Shomali

Population (2016)
  - Total: 4,687
- Time zone: UTC+3:30 (IRST)

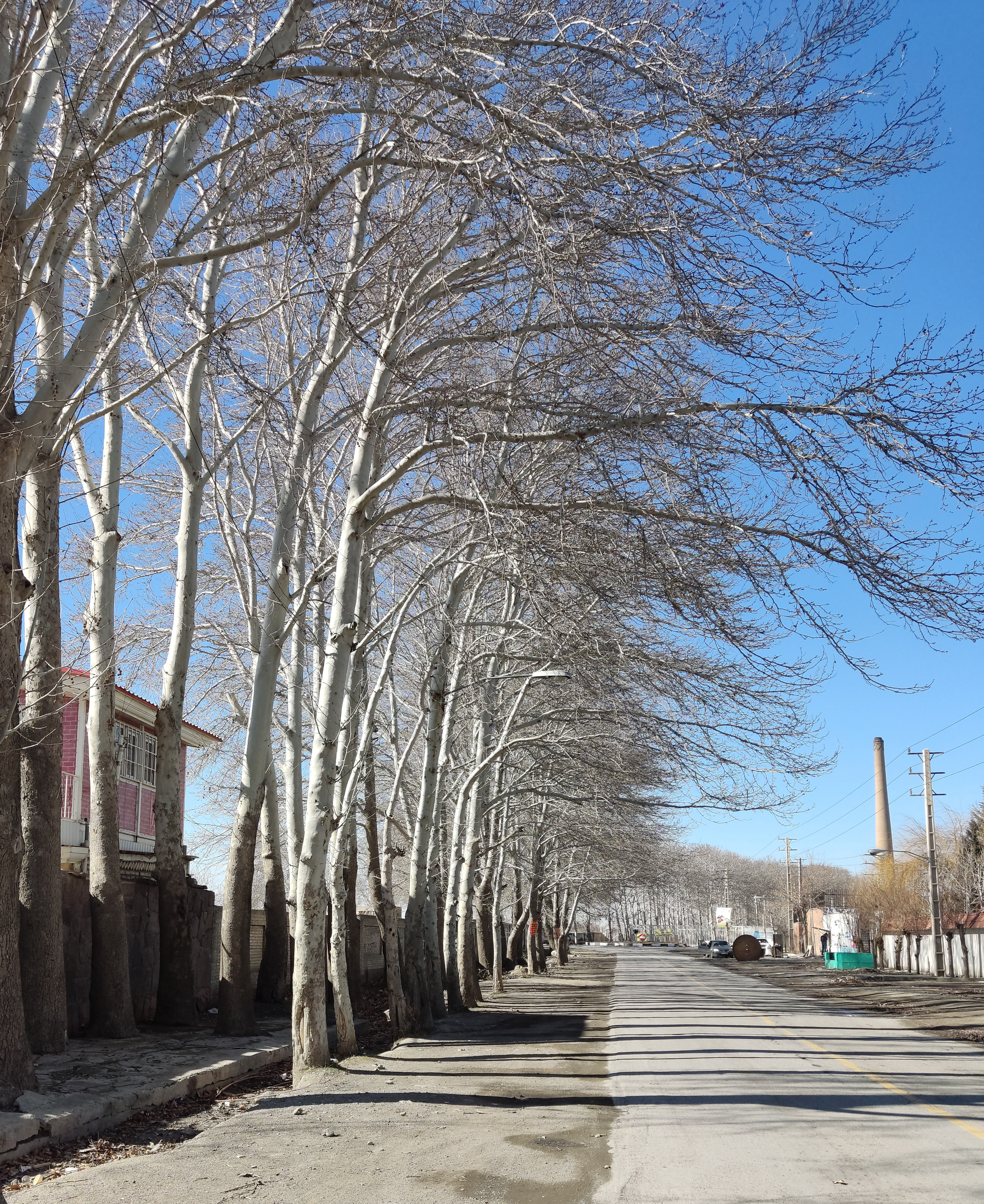
Boulevard in Khoshnam Village during the summer

Khvoshnam (Persian: خوشنام) (Note: Also romanized as Khoshnam and Khoshnām; also known as Shahnām (شهنام)) is a village in Malard-e Shomali Rural District (Note: Formerly Malard Rural District) of the Central District in Malard County, Tehran province, Iran.

== Demographics ==
=== Population ===
At the time of the 2006 National Census, the village's population was 3,211 in 783 households, when it was in Malard Rural District (Note: Renamed Malard-e Shomali Rural District) of the Central District in Shahriar County. The following census in 2011 counted 3,572 people in 939 households, by which time the rural district had been separated from the county in the establishment of Malard County. The rural district was transferred to the new Central District and renamed Malard-e Shomali Rural District. The 2016 census measured the population of the village as 4,687 people in 1,357 households.
