= Lomabad =

Village in Tehran province, Iran

Lomabad Persian: لماباد
- Village
- Location within Iran
- Coordinates: 35°38′24″N 50°57′25″E
- Country: Iran
- Province: Tehran
- County: Malard
- District: Central
- Rural District: Malard-e Shomali

Population (2016)
  - Total: 3,227
- Time zone: UTC+3:30 (IRST)

Lomabad (Persian: لماباد) (Note: Also romanized as Lomābād) is a village in Malard-e Shomali Rural District (Note: Formerly Malard Rural District) of the Central District in Malard County, Tehran province, Iran.

== Demographics ==
=== Population ===
At the time of the 2006 National Census, the village's population was 4,123 in 994 households, when it was in Malard Rural District (Note: Renamed Malard-e Shomali Rural District) of the Central District in Shahriar County. The following census in 2011 counted 3,131 people in 837 households, by which time the rural district had been separated from the county in the establishment of Malard County. The rural district was transferred to the new Central District and renamed Malard-e Shomali Rural District. The 2016 census measured the population of the village as 3,227 people in 1,002 households.
