= Mehr Azin =

Village in Tehran province, Iran

Mehr Azin Persian: مهراذين
- Village
- Location within Iran
- Coordinates: 35°37′27″N 50°57′58″E
- Country: Iran
- Province: Tehran
- County: Malard
- District: Central
- Rural District: Malard-e Shomali

Population (2016)
  - Total: 958
- Time zone: UTC+3:30 (IRST)

Mehr Azin (Persian: مهراذين) (Note: Also romanized as Mehr Āz̄īn) is a village in Malard-e Shomali Rural District (Note: Formerly Malard Rural District) of the Central District in Malard County, Tehran province, Iran.

== Demographics ==
=== Population ===
At the time of the 2006 National Census, the village's population was 1,189 in 296 households, when it was in Malard Rural District (Note: Renamed Malard-e Shomali Rural District) of the Central District in Shahriar County. The following census in 2011 counted 883 people in 253 households, by which time the rural district had been separated from the county in the establishment of Malard County. The rural district was transferred to the new Central District and renamed Malard-e Shomali Rural District. The 2016 census measured the population of the village as 958 people in 278 households.
