= Varabad, Tehran =

Varabad وراباد
- Village
- Location within Iran
- Coordinates: 35°35′45″N 50°26′28″E
- Country: Iran
- Province: Tehran
- County: Malard
- Bakhsh: Central
- Rural District: Akhtarabad

Population (2006)
  - Total: 353
- Time zone: UTC+3:30 (IRST)
  - Summer (DST): UTC+4:30 (IRDT)

Varabad (Persian: وراباد, also Romanized as Varābād and Vārābād) is a village in Akhtarabad Rural District, in the Central District of Malard County, Tehran Province, Iran. At the 2006 census, its population was 353, in 83 families.
