= Hoseynabad-e Alizadeh =

Hoseynabad-e Alizadeh حسين ابادعليزاده
- Village
- Location within Iran
- Coordinates: 35°34′39″N 50°39′21″E
- Country: Iran
- Province: Tehran
- County: Malard
- Bakhsh: Central
- Rural District: Akhtarabad

Population (2006)
  - Total: 45
- Time zone: UTC+3:30 (IRST)
  - Summer (DST): UTC+4:30 (IRDT)

Hoseynabad-e Alizadeh (Persian: حسين ابادعليزاده, also Romanized as Ḩoseynābād-e ‘Alīzādeh; also known as Ḩoseynābād and Husainābād) is a village in Akhtarabad Rural District, in the Central District of Malard County, Tehran Province, Iran. According to the 2006 census, its population was 45 in 11 families.
