= Mehrchin =

Village in Tehran province, Iran

Mehrchin Persian: مهرچين
- Village
- Location within Iran
- Coordinates: 35°37′09″N 50°57′54″E
- Country: Iran
- Province: Tehran
- County: Malard
- District: Central
- Rural District: Malard-e Shomali

Population (2016)
  - Total: 970
- Time zone: UTC+3:30 (IRST)

Mehrchin (Persian: مهرچين) (Note: Also romanized as Mehrchīn) is a village in Malard-e Shomali Rural District (Note: Formerly Malard Rural District) of the Central District in Malard County, Tehran province, Iran.

== Demographics ==
=== Population ===
At the time of the 2006 National Census, the village's population was 842 in 240 households, when it was in Malard Rural District (Note: Renamed Malard-e Shomali Rural District) of the Central District in Shahriar County. The following census in 2011 counted 1,041 people in 281 households, by which time the rural district had been separated from the county in the establishment of Malard County. The rural district was transferred to the new Central District and renamed Malard-e Shomali Rural District. The 2016 census measured the population of the village as 970 people in 294 households.
