= Amiriyeh, Malard =

Amiriyeh اميريه
- village
- Location within Iran
- Coordinates: 35°39′32″N 50°49′19″E
- Country: Iran
- Province: Tehran
- County: Malard
- Bakhsh: Central
- Rural District: Bibi Sakineh

Population (2006)
  - Total: 64
- Time zone: UTC+3:30 (IRST)
  - Summer (DST): UTC+4:30 (IRDT)

Amiriyeh (Persian: اميريه, also Romanized as Amīrīyeh) is a village in Bibi Sakineh Rural District, in the Central District of Malard County, Tehran Province, Iran. At the 2006 census, its population was 64, in 15 families.
