= Qaleh-ye Faramarzi =

Village in Tehran province, Iran

Qaleh-ye Faramarzi Persian: قلعه فرامرزی
- Village
- Location within Iran
- Coordinates: 35°41′28″N 50°57′00″E
- Country: Iran
- Province: Tehran
- County: Malard
- District: Central
- Rural District: Malard-e Shomali

Population (2016)
  - Total: 3,866
- Time zone: UTC+3:30 (IRST)

Qaleh-ye Faramarzi (Persian: قلعه فرامرزی) (Note: Also romanized as Qal‘eh-ye Farāmarzī; also known as Qal‘eh Farāmuz and Qal‘eh-ye Farāmarz) is a village in Malard-e Shomali Rural District (Note: Formerly Malard Rural District) of the Central District in Malard County, Tehran province, Iran.

== Demographics ==
=== Population ===
At the time of the 2006 National Census, the village's population was 2,812 in 766 households, when it was in Malard Rural District (Note: Renamed Malard-e Shomali Rural District) of the Central District in Shahriar County. The following census in 2011 counted 4,395 people in 1,277 households, by which time the rural district had been separated from the county in the establishment of Malard County. The rural district was transferred to the new Central District and renamed Malard-e Shomali Rural District. The 2016 census measured the population of the village as 3,866 people in 1,161 households.
