= Chahar Bagh, Malard =

Chahar Bagh چهارباغ
- Village
- Location within Iran
- Coordinates: 35°35′22″N 50°45′55″E
- Country: Iran
- Province: Tehran
- County: Malard
- Bakhsh: Central
- Rural District: Akhtarabad

Population (2006)
  - Total: 71
- Time zone: UTC+3:30 (IRST)
  - Summer (DST): UTC+4:30 (IRDT)

Chahar Bagh (Persian: چهارباغ, also Romanized as Chahār Bāgh) is a village in Akhtarabad Rural District, in the Central District of Malard County, Tehran Province, Iran. At the 2006 census, its population was 71, in 18 families.
