= Salehabad, Malard =

Salehabad (Persian: صالح اباد) in Malard County, Iran may refer to:

- Mehrdasht, Tehran
- Salehabad-e Hesar-e Shalpush
