= Hoseynabad-e Jadid =

Hoseynabad-e Jadid (Persian: حسين ابادجديد) may refer to:

- Hoseynabad-e Jadid, Darab, Fars Province
- Hoseynabad-e Jadid, Anbarabad, Kerman Province
- Hoseynabad-e Jadid, Zarand, Kerman Province
- Hoseynabad-e Jadid, Razavi Khorasan
