= Varabad =

Varabad or Warabad (Persian: وراباد) may refer to:

- Varabad, Markazi
- Varabad, Tehran
