= Chahar Bagh, Tehran =

Chahar Bagh (Persian: چهارباغ) in Tehran Province may refer to:

- Chahar Bagh, Malard
- Chahar Bagh, Shemiranat
