= Esfandabad =

Esfandabad (Persian: اسفنداباد) may refer to:

- Esfandabad, Kurdistan
- Esfandabad, Tehran
- Esfandabad, Yazd
