= Mehrdasht (disambiguation) =

Mehrdasht is a city in Yazd Province, Iran.

Mehrdasht (Persian: درده) may also refer to:

- Mehrdasht, Tehran
- Mehrdasht District, in Isfahan Province
