= Aq Qui =

Aq Qui (Persian: آق قوئي or اق قويي) may refer to:

- Aq Qui, Tehran (اق قويي - Āq Qū'ī)
- Aq Qui, Zanjan (آق قوئي - Aq Qū’ī)
