= Mehrdasht, Tehran =

Village in Tehran province, Iran

Mehrdasht Persian: مهردشت
- Village
- Location within Iran
- Coordinates: 35°41′41″N 50°47′42″E
- Country: Iran
- Province: Tehran
- County: Malard
- District: Safadasht
- Rural District: Bibi Sakineh

Population (2016)
  - Total: 2,101
- Time zone: UTC+3:30 (IRST)

Mehrdasht (Persian: مهردشت) (Note: Also known as Khātūnlar (خاتون لر), Khātūnlar va Şāleḩābād, and Şāleḩābād (صالح اباد)) is a village in Bibi Sakineh Rural District of Safadasht District in Malard County, Tehran province, Iran.

== Demographics ==
=== Population ===
At the time of the 2006 National Census, the village's population was 1,985 in 490 households, when it was in the former Malard District of Shahriar County. The following census in 2011 counted 2,307 people in 635 households, by which time the district had been separated from the county in the establishment of Malard County. The rural district was transferred to the new Safadasht District. The 2016 census measured the population of the village as 2,101 people in 652 households.
