= Dehak, Tehran =

Village in Tehran province, Iran

Dehak Persian: دهك
- Village
- Location within Iran
- Coordinates: 35°40′38″N 50°52′09″E
- Country: Iran
- Province: Tehran
- County: Malard
- District: Safadasht
- Rural District: Bibi Sakineh

Population (2016)
  - Total: 503
- Time zone: UTC+3:30 (IRST)

Dehak (Persian: دهك) (Note: Also romanized as Dahak) is a village in Bibi Sakineh Rural District of Safadasht District in Malard County, Tehran province, Iran.

== Demographics ==
=== Population ===
At the time of the 2006 National Census, the village's population was 493 in 112 households, when it was in the former Malard District of Shahriar County. The following census in 2011 counted 534 people in 129 households, by which time the district had been separated from the county in the establishment of Malard County. The rural district was transferred to the new Safadasht District. The 2016 census measured the population of the village as 503 people in 132 households.
