= Malard-e Jonubi Rural District =

Rural district in Tehran province, Iran

Malard-e Jonubi Rural District Persian: دهستان ملارد جنوبی
- Rural District
- Location within Iran
- Coordinates: 35°38′N 50°52′E
- Country: Iran
- Province: Tehran
- County: Malard
- District: Central
- Established: 2009
- Capital: Bid Kaneh

Population (2016)
  - Total: 12,399
- Time zone: UTC+3:30 (IRST)

Malard-e Jonubi Rural District (Persian: دهستان ملارد جنوبی) is in the Central District of Malard County, Tehran province, Iran. Its capital is the village of Bid Kaneh.

== History ==
In 2009, Malard District was separated from Shahriar County in the establishment of Malard County, and Malard-e Jonubi Rural District was created in the new Central District.

== Demographics ==
=== Population ===
At the time of the 2011 National Census, the rural district's population was 11,673 inhabitants in 3,227 households. The 2016 census measured the population of the rural district as 12,399 in 3,688 households. The most populous of its 11 villages was Bid Kaneh, with 6,193 people.

=== Other villages in the rural district ===
- Esfandabad
- Hesar-e Shalpush
- Qebchaq
- Salehabad-e Hesar-e Shalpush
