= Jama Mosque, Lucknow =

Mosque in Lucknow, Uttar Pradesh, India

Jama Mosque
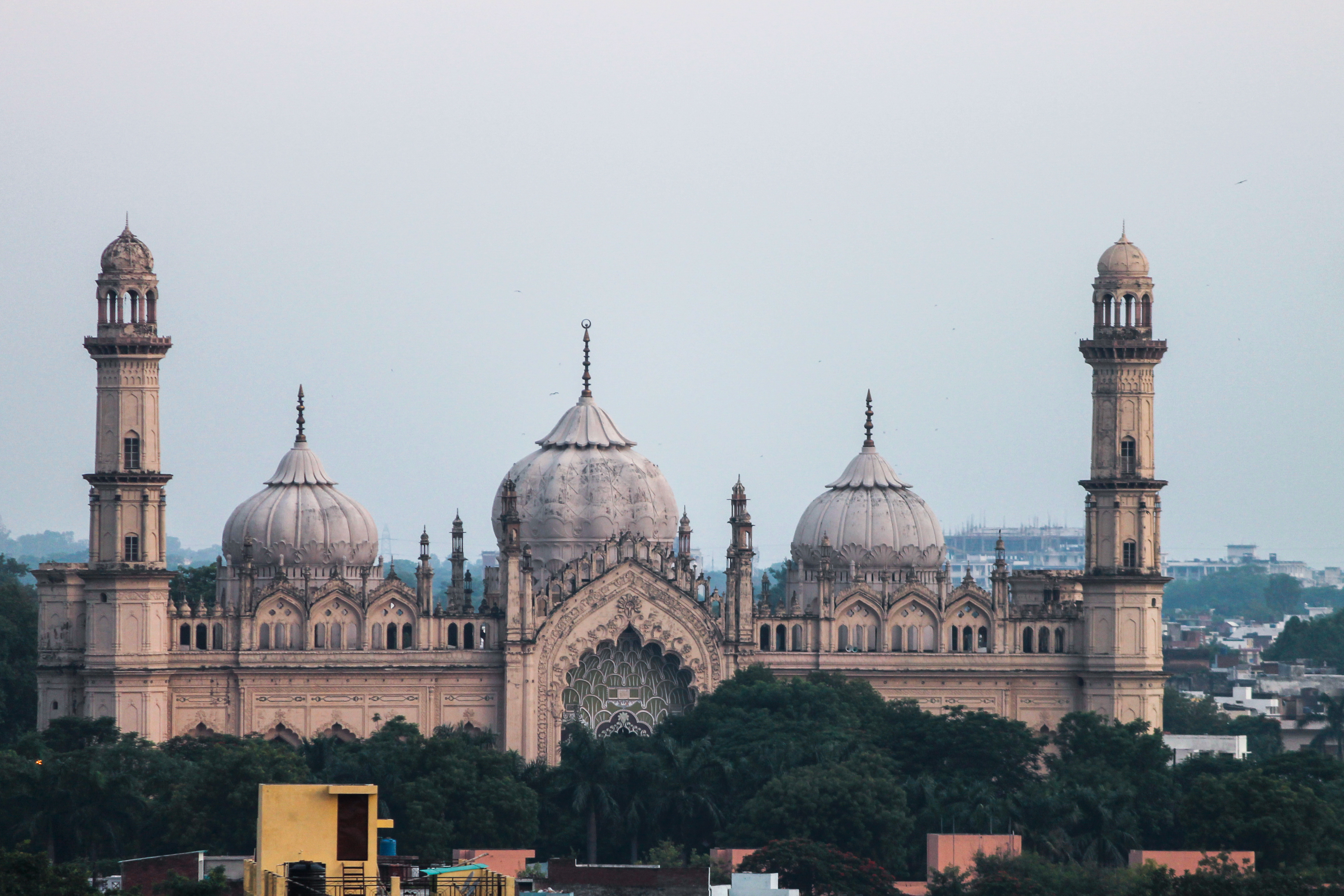
- The grand and large mosque, in 2013

- Location of the mosque in Uttar Pradesh

Religion
- Affiliation: Shia Islam
- Ecclesiastical or organizational status: Friday mosque
- Status: Active

Location
- Location: Husainabad, Lucknow, Uttar Pradesh
- Country: India
- Interactive map of Jama Mosque
- Coordinates: 26°52′21″N 80°54′04″E

Architecture
- Type: Mosque architecture
- Style: Indo-Islamic; Mughal
- Founder: Muhammad Ali Shah; Queen Malika Jahan Sahiba
- Groundbreaking: 1839 CE
- Completed: 1845 CE (Note: However, never fully completed to initial designs.)

Specifications
- Dome: 3
- Minaret: 4 (incl. 2 incomplete)
- Materials: Lakhauri bricks; lime mortar; stucco

Monument of National Importance
- Official name: Jama Masjid near Hussainabad
- Reference no.: N-UP-L277
- Location of the mosque in Lucknow

The Jama Mosque, also known as the Jama Masjid, is a Shi'ite Friday mosque located in the area of Husainabad, Lucknow, in the state of Uttar Pradesh, India. The construction of the mosque started in 1839 CE by Muhammad Ali Shah, third Badshah of Awadh with the intention to surpass the Jama Masjid in Delhi in size. It was incomplete at the time of his death, and the mosque was completed by his wife, Queen Malika Jahan Sahiba, in 1845 CE, although not all planned elements were completed.

The mosque is a Monuments of National Importance, administered by the Archaeological Survey of India.

== Architecture ==
Built with "Lakhauri" bricks and plastered with lime, it is decorated with coloured stucco motifs. Standing on a square lofty terrace, it has a rectangular prayer hall, on the west with a magnificent façade of eleven arches. The central one is higher and provided with an unusually high doorway which rises above the roof in a sharply pointed arch decorated in coloured stucco.

The prayer hall is surmounted by three pear-shaped high double domes decorated with an inverted lotus on the top and is also flanked by two octagonal four-storeyed tapering minarets on either side, crowned by "Chhatries" on the top. An imambara, known as Imambara Malika Jahan, is also situated at the south of the mosque.

== Gallery ==
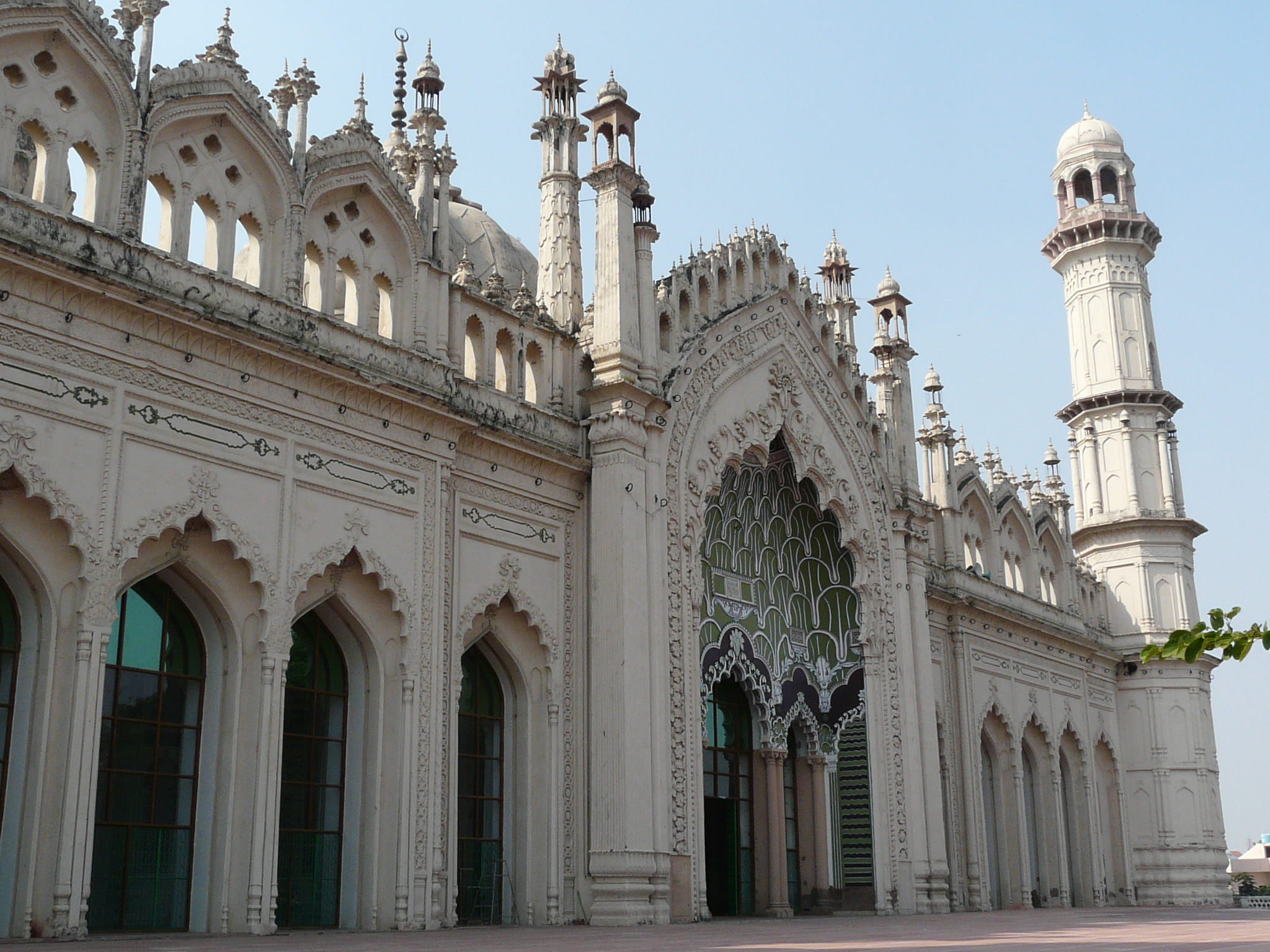
The mosque façade in 2010

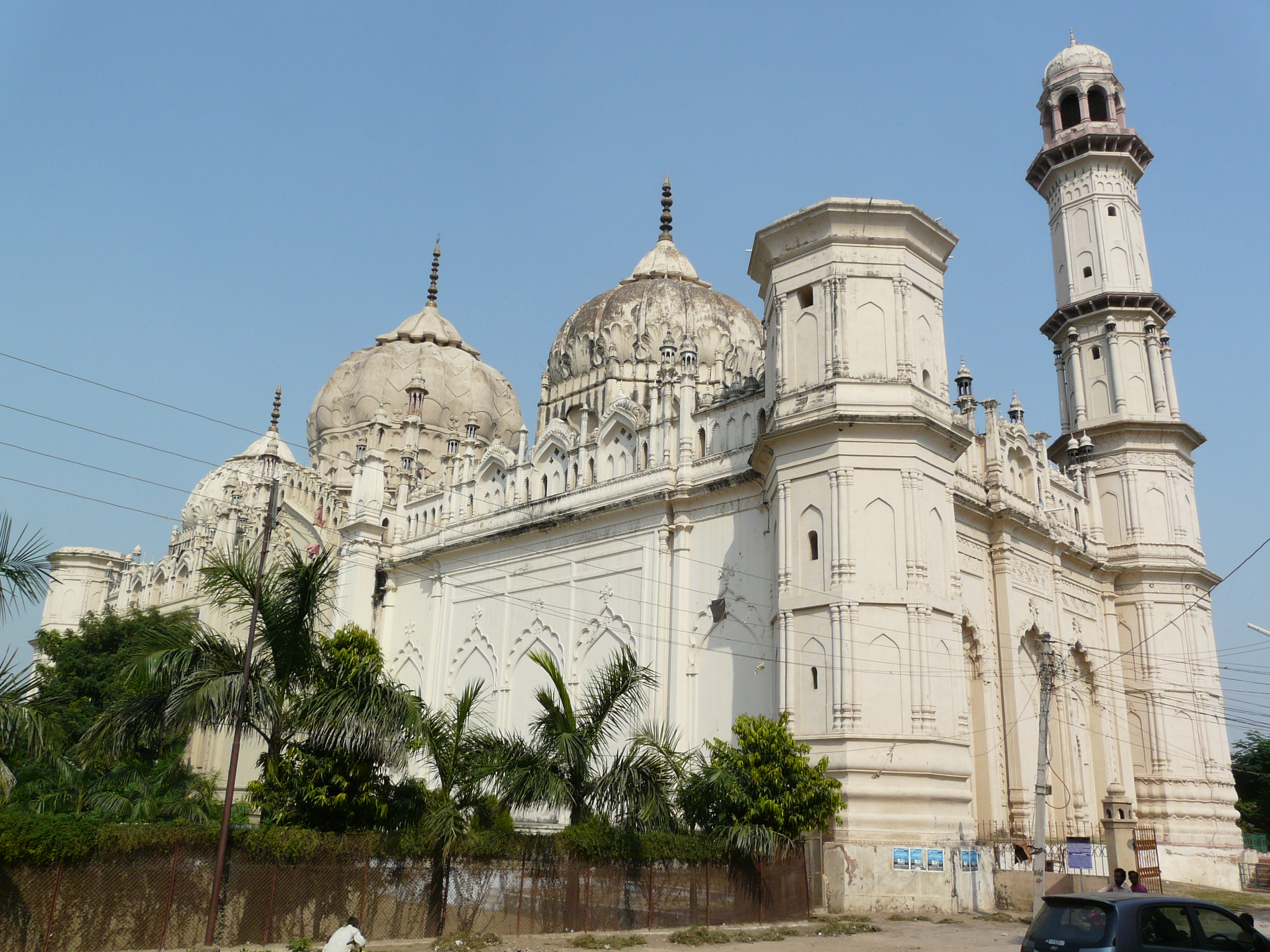
Close up detail in 2010

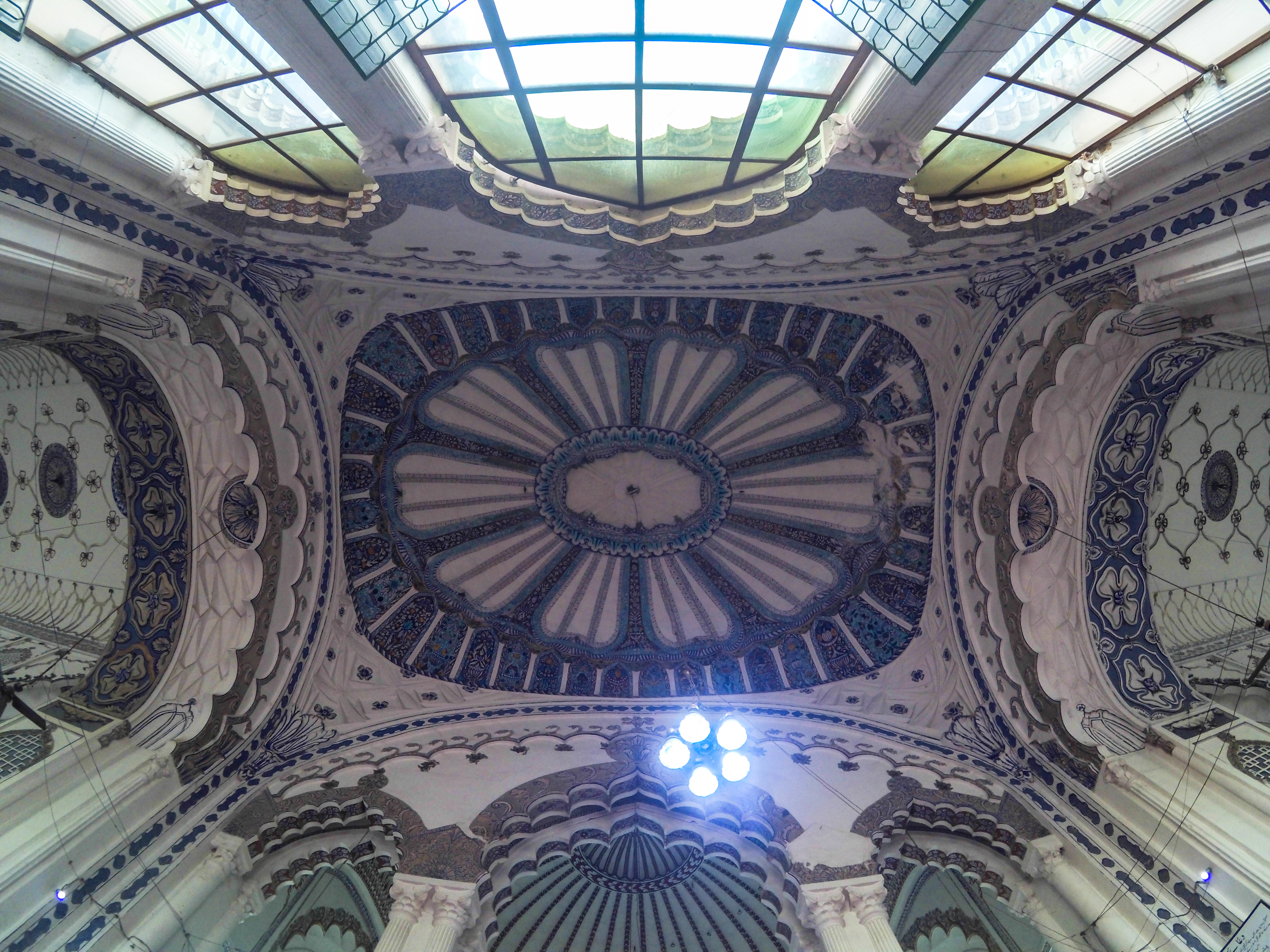
Mosque interior

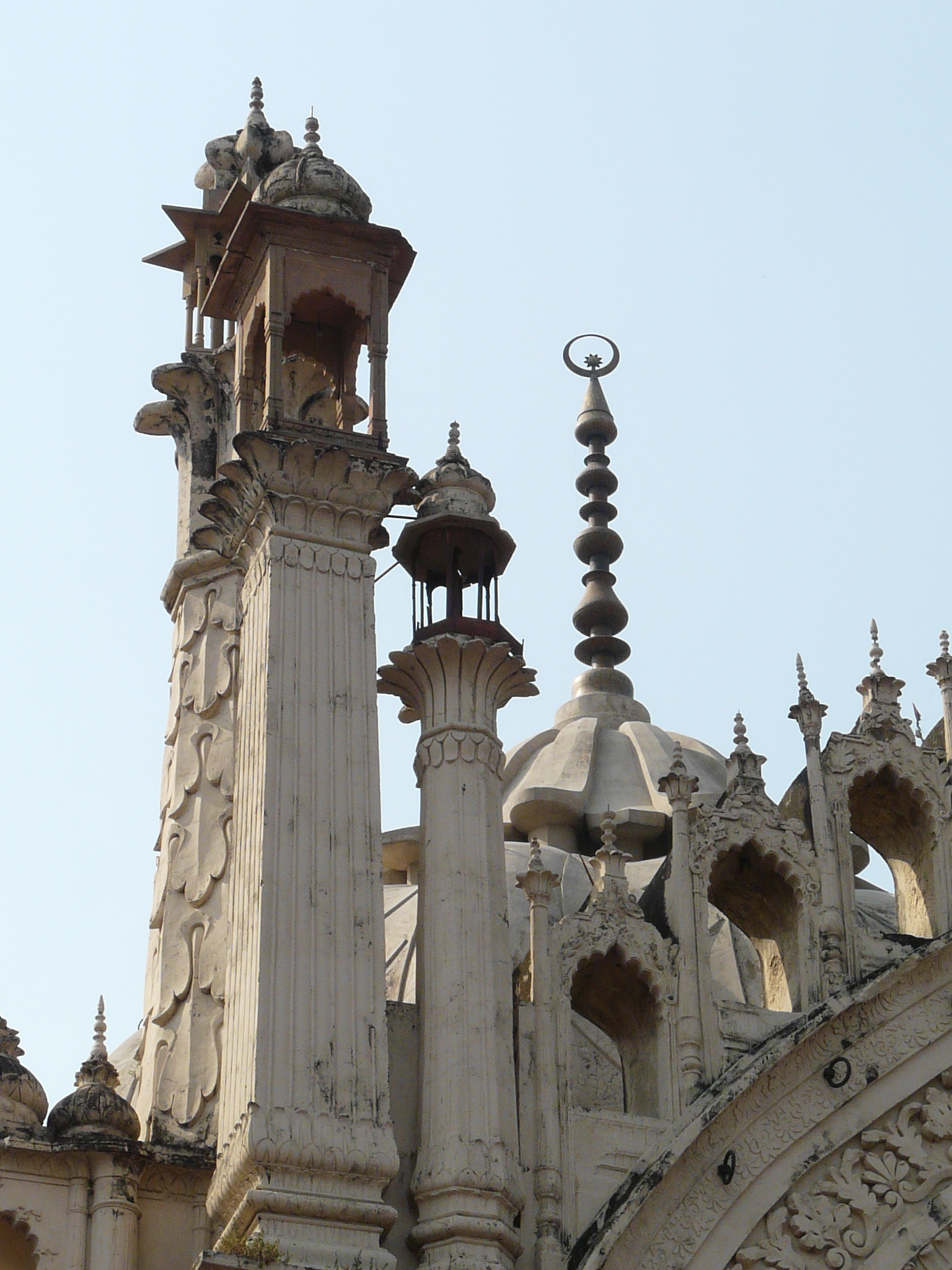
Rooftop detail

== See also ==
- Shia Islam in India
- List of mosques in India
- List of Monuments of National Importance in Lucknow
