= Gövdərə =

Göydərə
- Location within Azerbaijan
- Coordinates: 38°37′52″N 48°21′23″E
- Country: Azerbaijan
- Rayon: Lerik
- Municipality: Kələxan
- Time zone: UTC+4 (AZT)
  - Summer (DST): UTC+5 (AZT)

Gövdərə (also, Gevdara and Gevdere) is a village in the Lerik Rayon of Azerbaijan. The village forms part of the municipality of Kələxan.
