= Kəlvəz =

Village in Lerik, Azerbaijan

Kyalvaz
- Location within Azerbaijan
- Coordinates: 38°37′25″N 48°21′40″E
- Country: Azerbaijan
- Rayon: Lerik
- Municipality: Kələxan
- Time zone: UTC+4 (AZT)
  - Summer (DST): UTC+5 (AZT)

Kyalvaz (also, Kil’vyazy, Kyal’vyas’, and Kyalvaz) is a village in the Lerik Rayon of Azerbaijan. The village forms part of the municipality of Kələxan.
