= Safadasht =

City in Tehran province, Iran

Safadasht Persian: صفادشت
- City
- Location within Iran
- Coordinates: 35°41′31″N 50°50′53″E
- Country: Iran
- Province: Tehran
- County: Malard
- District: Safadasht
- Established as a city: 1998

Population (2016)
  - Total: 32,476
- Time zone: UTC+3:30 (IRST)

Safadasht (Persian: صفادشت) (Note: Also known as Safādašt) is a city in, and the capital of, Safadasht District of Malard County, Tehran province, Iran. It also serves as the administrative center for Bibi Sakineh Rural District. In 1998, the villages of Abadiyeh (عبادیه), Hesar-e Tahmasab (حصار طهماسب), Nasirabad (نصیر آباد), and Shahrabad (شهر آباد) merged to form the city of Safadasht.

== Demographics ==
=== Population ===
At the time of the 2006 National Census, the city's population was 15,855 in 4,056 households, when it was in the former Malard District of Shahriar County. The following census in 2011 counted 19,233 people in 5,344 households, by which time the district had been separated from the county in the establishment of Malard County. The city and the rural district were transferred to the new Safadasht District. The 2016 census measured the population of the city as 32,476 people in 9,687 households.
