= Kələxan =

- Municipality
- Location within Azerbaijan
- Coordinates: 38°39′00″N 48°20′56″E
- Country: Azerbaijan
- Rayon: Lerik

Population
  - Total: 942
- Time zone: UTC+4 (AZT)
  - Summer (DST): UTC+5 (AZT)

Kələxan is a village and municipality in the Lerik Rayon of Azerbaijan. It has a population of 942. The municipality consists of the villages of Kələxan, Kəlvəz, Məhləabad, Hüseynabad, and Gövdərə.
