= Nadan Mahal =

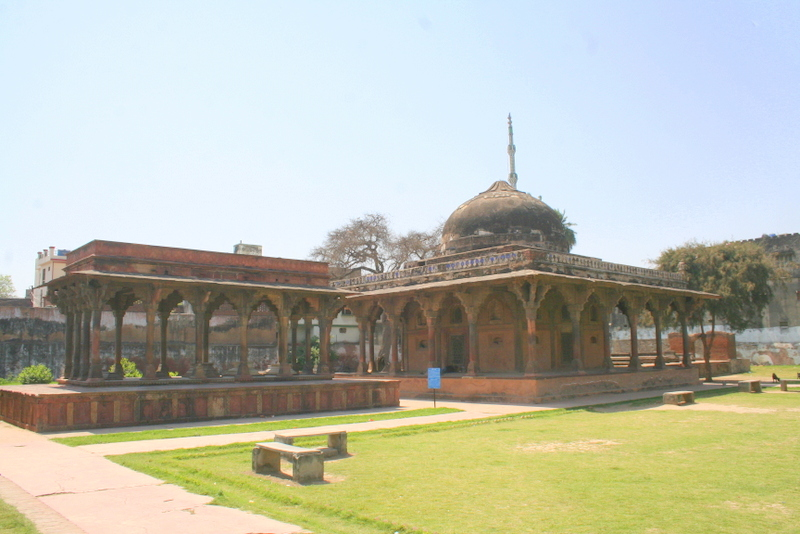
- Interactive map of Nadan Mahal
- Location: Nadan Mahal Road, Lucknow, Uttar Pradesh, India
- Type: Mausoleum
- Material: Stone
- Beginning date: Late 16th century
- Completion date: Early 17th century
- Dedicated to: Shaikh Ibrahim Chishti

Nadan Mahal is a 16th-century mausoleum located on Nadan Mahal Road, Lucknow, Uttar Pradesh, India. The monument was constructed in memory of Shaikh Ibrahim Chishti, who died in 1543 and served as the first Governor of Lucknow under the Mughal Empire.

The name Nadan derives from the Persian naadan (meaning innocent), and the mausoleum was intended to symbolise the saint’s piety and simplicity.

== Historical associations ==
Nadan Mahal became an important centre of early Islamic authority in Lucknow. The Chishti lineage buried here was closely connected to the rise of the Sheikh community of Awadh, who later played an influential role in the region’s administration and society.

The tomb complex is associated with the local nobleman, Shaikh Abdur Rahim from Bijnor, Uttar Pradesh, who rose through the ranks to become the first Mughal subedar of Lucknow. Rahim commissioned his own cenotaph at Nadan Mahal, reflecting his family’s ties to the saint and the Sheikh community of Lucknow. Rahim also undertook several architectural projects in the city, including the construction of the Panch Mahal and Machchi Bhawan, both of which were intended for his sons.

== Connection with Machchi Bhawan ==
Machchi Bhawan fort-palace, situated near the banks of the Gomti River, became a major centre of power in Awadh. Originally built by Shaikh Abdur Rahim, it symbolised the consolidation of Mughal authority in the region. Its link with Nadan Mahal lies in the shared patronage of Rahim, who balanced both spiritual devotion (through his cenotaph near Shaikh Ibrahim Chishti) and temporal power (through Machchi Bhawan for his heirs). This connection illustrates the overlapping networks of saints, courtiers, and rulers that shaped early Lucknow.

== Sheikh community and Firangi Mahal ==
The Sheikh families of Lucknow, including those linked with Nadan Mahal, were later instrumental in the city’s religious and intellectual life. The Firangi Mahal seminary, established in the late 17th century, drew upon these earlier Chishti and Sheikh traditions, providing continuity between the saintly legacies of sites like Nadan Mahal and the scholastic authority of Lucknow’s ulema.

== See also ==
- Firangi Mahal
- Machchi Bhawan
- Awadh
- Lucknow
