= Nadan Mahal Road =

Nadan Mahal road

Route information
- Length: 1.2 km (0.75 mi)

Major junctions
- South-East end: Rakabganj Chauraha
- North-West end: Nakhas Chauraha

Location
- Country: India

Highway system
- Roads in India; Expressways; National; State; Asian

Nadan Mahal Road is a road located in Lucknow, Uttar Pradesh in India, that travels through Yahiyaganj.The road is 1.2 kilometres (0.75 mi) in length, it starts at Rakabganj Chauraha and ends at Nakhas Chauraha on Tulsidas Marg.

== Places of interest ==
- Nadan Mahal (mausoleum of Shaikh Ibrahim Chishti)
- Yahiyaganj (shopping district)
