= Amiriyeh, Kerman =

Amiriyeh اميريه
- Village
- Location within Iran
- Coordinates: 28°58′29″N 58°48′59″E
- Country: Iran
- Province: Kerman
- County: Narmashir
- Bakhsh: Central
- Rural District: Posht Rud

Population (2006)
  - Total: 34
- Time zone: UTC+3:30 (IRST)
  - Summer (DST): UTC+4:30 (IRDT)

Amiriyeh (Persian: اميريه, also Romanized as Amīrīyeh) is a village in Posht Rud Rural District, in the Central District of Narmashir County, Kerman Province, Iran. At the 2006 census, its population was 34, in 7 families.
