= Amiriyeh, North Khorasan =

Amiriyeh اميريه
- Village
- Location within Iran
- Coordinates: 37°45′49″N 57°45′34″E
- Country: Iran
- Province: North Khorasan
- County: Shirvan
- Bakhsh: Qushkhaneh
- Rural District: Qushkhaneh-ye Bala

Population (2006)
  - Total: 46
- Time zone: UTC+3:30 (IRST)
  - Summer (DST): UTC+4:30 (IRDT)

Amiriyeh (Persian: اميريه, also Romanized as Āmīrīyeh; also known as Amīrkhān, Qal‘eh-ye Amīrkhan, and Qal‘eh-ye Amīr Khān) is a village in Qushkhaneh-ye Bala Rural District, Qushkhaneh District, Shirvan County, North Khorasan Province, Iran. At the 2006 census, its population was 46, in 11 families.
