= Amiriyeh, Sirjan =

Amiriyeh اميريه
- Village
- Location within Iran
- Coordinates: 28°59′51″N 55°07′03″E
- Country: Iran
- Province: Kerman
- County: Sirjan
- Bakhsh: Central
- Rural District: Sharifabad

Population (2006)
  - Total: 61
- Time zone: UTC+3:30 (IRST)
  - Summer (DST): UTC+4:30 (IRDT)

Amiriyeh (Persian: اميريه, also Romanized as Amīrīyeh; also known as Chāh-e Kalleh-ye Bālā (Persian: چاه كله بالا) and Amīrīyeh-ye Qaţār Boneh) is a village in Sharifabad Rural District, in the Central District of Sirjan County, Kerman Province, Iran. At the 2006 census, its population was 61, in 14 families.
