= Malard =

City in Tehran province, Iran

Malard Persian: ملارد
- City
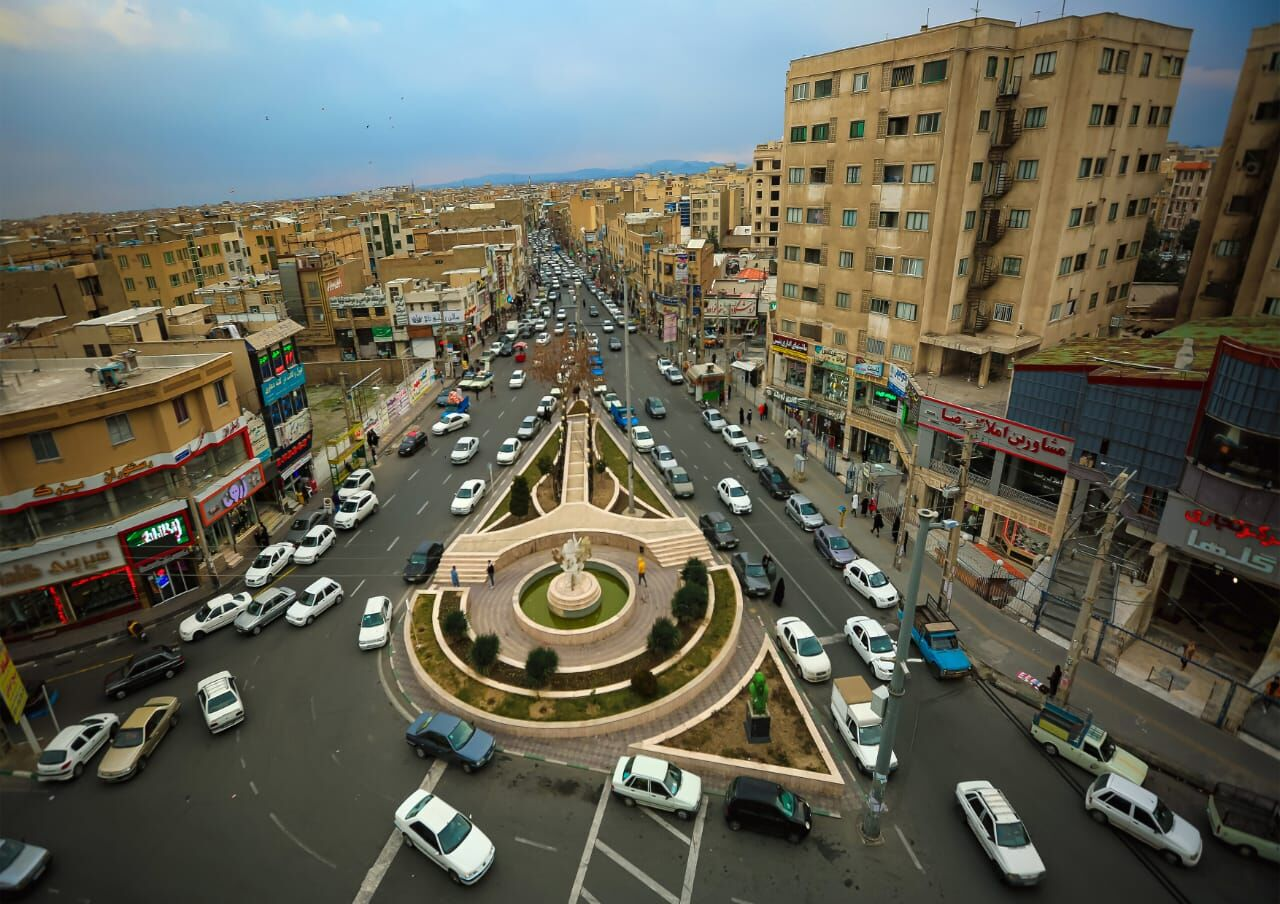
- Golha Square in the city of Malard

- Location within Iran
- Coordinates: 35°40′50″N 50°58′42″E
- Country: Iran
- Province: Tehran
- County: Malard
- District: Central
- Established: 1995

Population (2016)
  - Total: 281,027
- Time zone: UTC+3:30 (IRST)

Malard (Persian: ملارد) (Note: Also romanized as Malārd and Melārd; also known as Malār) is a city in the Central District of Malard County, Tehran province, Iran, serving as capital of both the county and the district. It is also the administrative center for Malard-e Shomali Rural District. (Note: Formerly Malard Rural District) In 1995, the village of Malard merged with the village of Sar Asiab-e Malard (سرآسیاب ملارد) to become the city of Malard.

== Demographics ==
=== Population ===
At the time of the 2006 National Census, the city's population was 228,673 in 61,302 households, when it was capital of the former Malard District of Shahriar County. The following census in 2011 counted 290,817 people in 85,445 households, by which time the district had been separated from the county in the establishment of Malard County. The city and the rural district were transferred to the new Central District, with Malard as the county's capital. The 2016 census measured the population of the city as 281,027 people in 86,830 households.

== Climate ==
Köppen-Geiger climate classification system classifies its climate as cold semi-arid (BSk).

Climate data for Malard
Month	Jan	Feb	Mar	Apr	May	Jun	Jul	Aug	Sep	Oct	Nov	Dec	Year
Mean daily maximum °C (°F)	6.2 (43.2)	8.9 (48.0)	13.8 (56.8)	20.3 (68.5)	28 (82)	32.4 (90.3)	34.7 (94.5)	35.1 (95.2)	30.2 (86.4)	24.6 (76.3)	16 (61)	10 (50)	21.7 (71.0)
Daily mean °C (°F)	1.2 (34.2)	3.6 (38.5)	8 (46)	13.8 (56.8)	20.7 (69.3)	24.6 (76.3)	27 (81)	27.6 (81.7)	22.6 (72.7)	17.8 (64.0)	10.2 (50.4)	4.9 (40.8)	15.2 (59.3)
Mean daily minimum °C (°F)	−3.8 (25.2)	−1.7 (28.9)	2.3 (36.1)	7.3 (45.1)	13.4 (56.1)	16.9 (62.4)	19.4 (66.9)	20.2 (68.4)	15.1 (59.2)	11.1 (52.0)	4.4 (39.9)	−0.2 (31.6)	8.7 (47.7)
Average precipitation mm (inches)	43 (1.7)	35 (1.4)	39 (1.5)	33 (1.3)	17 (0.7)	5 (0.2)	2 (0.1)	2 (0.1)	4 (0.2)	15 (0.6)	26 (1.0)	32 (1.3)	253 (10.1)
Source: Climate-Data.org, altitude: 1191m

== Transportation ==
The city is served by buses from the municipal-run Malard and Suburbs Bus Organization, connecting the city to Shahriar, Karaj, Qods, and Tehran.

== Gallery ==
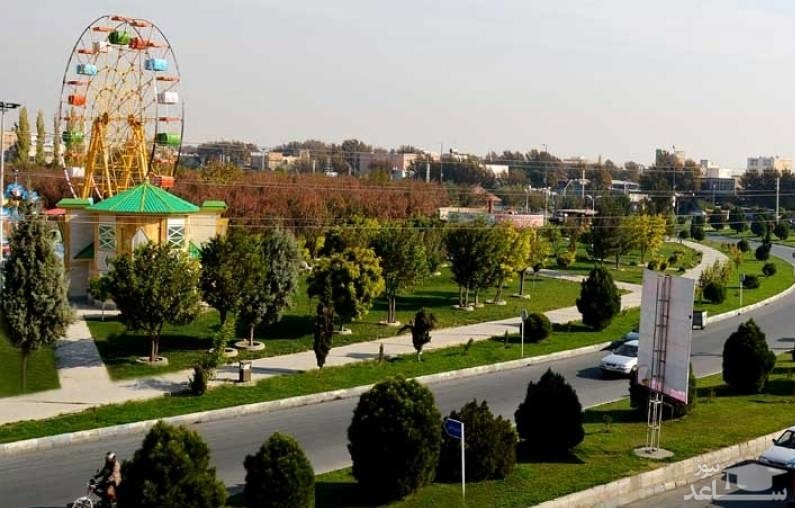
marlik

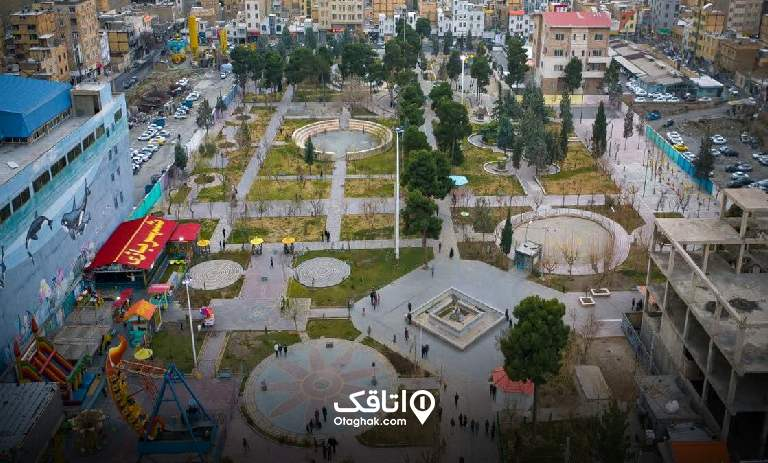
park of sarasiab

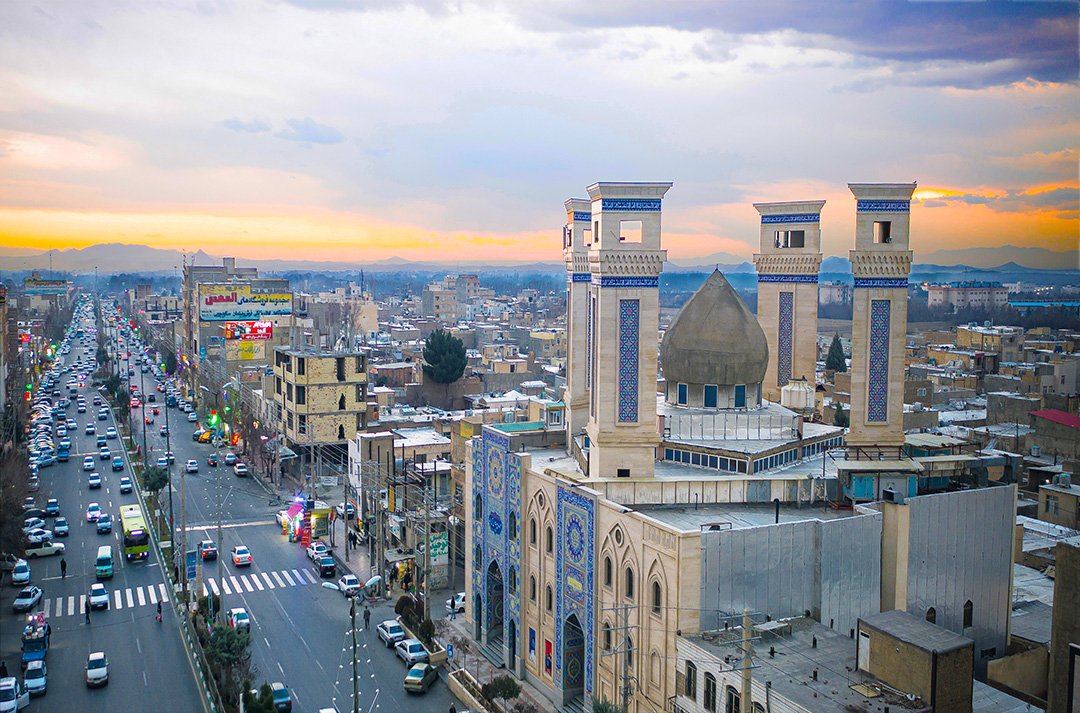
main st
