= Hussainabad, Kapurthala =

Hussainabad
- Village
- Location in Punjab, India Hussainabad (India)
- Coordinates: 31.349040°N 75.320811°E
- Country: India
- State: Punjab
- District: Kapurthala

Government
  - Body: Gram panchayat

Population (2011)
  - Total: 594
- Sex ratio 321/273♂/♀

Languages
  - Official: Punjabi
  - Other spoken: Hindi
- Time zone: UTC+5:30 (IST)
- PIN: 144620
- Telephone code: 01822
- ISO 3166 code: IN-PB
- Vehicle registration: PB-09
- Website: kapurthala.gov.in

Hussainabad is a village in Kapurthala district of Punjab State, India. It is located 9 kilometres (5.6 mi) from Kapurthala, which is both district and sub-district headquarters of Hussainabad. The village is administrated by a Sarpanch, who is an elected representative.

== Demography ==
According to the report published by Census India in 2011, Hussainabad has total number of 113 houses and population of 594 of which include 321 males and 273 females. Literacy rate of Hussainabad is 77.92%, higher than state average of 75.84%. The population of children under the age of 6 years is 64 which is 10.77% of total population of Hussainabad, and child sex ratio is approximately 939, higher than state average of 846.

== Population data ==
Particulars	Total	Male	Female
Total No. of Houses	113	-	-
Population	594	321	273
Child (0-6)	64	33	31
Schedule Caste	413	222	191
Schedule Tribe	0	0	0
Literacy	77.92 %	86.11 %	68.18 %
Total Workers	249	182	67
Main Worker	246	0	0
Marginal Worker	3	1	2

== Air travel connectivity ==
The closest airport to the village is Sri Guru Ram Dass Jee International Airport.
