= Amiriyeh, Hamadan =

Amiriyeh اميريه
- Village
- Location within Iran
- Coordinates: 35°17′59″N 48°59′32″E
- Country: Iran
- Province: Hamadan
- County: Razan
- Bakhsh: Central
- Rural District: Razan

Population (2006)
  - Total: 293
- Time zone: UTC+3:30 (IRST)
  - Summer (DST): UTC+4:30 (IRDT)

Amiriyeh (Persian: اميريه, also Romanized as Amīrīyeh; also known as Amria) is a village in Razan Rural District, in the Central District of Razan County, Hamadan Province, Iran. At the 2006 census, its population was 293, in 72 families.
