= Hoseynabad-e Jadid, Zarand =

Hoseynabad-e Jadid حسين ابادجديد
- Village
- Location within Iran
- Coordinates: 30°36′17″N 56°24′02″E
- Country: Iran
- Province: Kerman
- County: Zarand
- Bakhsh: Central
- Rural District: Jorjafak

Population (2006)
  - Total: 38
- Time zone: UTC+3:30 (IRST)
  - Summer (DST): UTC+4:30 (IRDT)

Hoseynabad-e Jadid (Persian: حسين ابادجديد, also Romanized as Ḩoseynābād-e Jadīd; also known as Ḩoseynābād, Ḩoseynābād-e Bādīz, and Ḩoseynābād-e Deh Now) is a village in Jorjafak Rural District, in the Central District of Zarand County, Kerman Province, Iran. At the 2006 census, its population was 38, in 10 families.
