= Hoseynabad, Ferdows, Rafsanjan =

Hoseynabad حسين اباد
- Village
- Location within Iran
- Coordinates: 30°46′58″N 55°51′49″E
- Country: Iran
- Province: Kerman
- County: Rafsanjan
- Bakhsh: Ferdows
- Rural District: Rezvan

Population (2006)
  - Total: 537
- Time zone: UTC+3:30 (IRST)
  - Summer (DST): UTC+4:30 (IRDT)

Hoseynabad (Persian: حسين اباد, also Romanized as Ḩoseynābād; also known as Ḩoseynābād-e Bālā, Ḩoseynābād-e ‘Olyā, and Husainābād) is a village in Rezvan Rural District, Ferdows District, Rafsanjan County, Kerman Province, Iran. At the 2006 census, its population was 537, in 139 families.
