= Kani Hoseynbag =

Kani Hoseynbag كاني حسين بگ
- Village
- Location within Iran
- Coordinates: 35°07′28″N 46°31′51″E
- Country: Iran
- Province: Kurdistan
- County: Sarvabad
- Bakhsh: Central
- Rural District: Zherizhah

Population (2006)
  - Total: 245
- Time zone: UTC+3:30 (IRST)
  - Summer (DST): UTC+4:30 (IRDT)

Kani Hoseynbag (Persian: كاني حسين بگ, also Romanized as Kānī Ḩoseynbag; also known as Ḩoseynābād, Husainabad, Kānī, Kānī Ḩoseyn Bak, Kānī Ḩoseyn Beg, Kānī Ḩoseyn Beyg, Kānī-ye Ḩoseyn Beyg, and Khāneh Husain Beg) is a village in Zherizhah Rural District, in the Central District of Sarvabad County, Kurdistan Province, Iran. At the 2006 census, its population was 245, in 53 families. The village is populated by Kurds.
