= Hoseynabad-e Jadid, Darab =

Hoseynabad-e Jadid حسين آباد جديد
- Village
- Location within Iran
- Coordinates: 28°31′16″N 55°25′16″E
- Country: Iran
- Province: Fars
- County: Darab
- Bakhsh: Rostaq
- Rural District: Kuhestan

Population (2006)
  - Total: 92
- Time zone: UTC+3:30 (IRST)
  - Summer (DST): UTC+4:30 (IRDT)

Hoseynabad-e Jadid (Persian: حسين آباد جديد, also Romanized as Ḩoseynābād-e Jadīd; also known as Ḩoseynābād) is a village in Kuhestan Rural District, Rostaq District, Darab County, Fars province, Iran. At the 2006 census, its population was 92, in 20 families.
