= Hoseynabad, Bagh Safa =

Hoseynabad حسين اباد
- Village
- Location within Iran
- Coordinates: 30°12′29″N 53°27′56″E
- Country: Iran
- Province: Fars
- County: Bavanat
- Bakhsh: Sarchehan
- Rural District: Bagh Safa

Population (2006)
  - Total: 429
- Time zone: UTC+3:30 (IRST)
  - Summer (DST): UTC+4:30 (IRDT)

Hoseynabad (Persian: حسين اباد, also romanized as Ḩoseynābād; also known as Ḩoseynābād-e Bāgh-e Sīāh and Husainābād) is a village in Bagh Safa Rural District, Sarchehan District, Bavanat County, Fars province, Iran. At the 2006 census its population was 429, in 93 families.
