= Hoseynabad-e Jadid, Anbarabad =

Hoseynabad-e Jadid حسين اباد جديد
- Village
- Location within Iran
- Coordinates: 28°24′39″N 57°54′34″E
- Country: Iran
- Province: Kerman
- County: Anbarabad
- Bakhsh: Esmaili
- Rural District: Hoseynabad

Population (2006)
  - Total: 618
- Time zone: UTC+3:30 (IRST)
  - Summer (DST): UTC+4:30 (IRDT)

Hoseynabad-e Jadid (Persian: حسين اباد جديد, also Romanized as Hoseynābād-e Jadīd; also known as Ḩoseynābād, Ḩoseynābād-e Novī, and Husainābād) is a village in Hoseynabad Rural District, Esmaili District, Anbarabad County, Kerman Province, Iran. At the 2006 census, its population was 618, in 138 families.
