= Dehak, Arsanjan =

Dehak دهك
- Village
- Location within Iran
- Coordinates: 29°45′05″N 53°16′25″E
- Country: Iran
- Province: Fars
- County: Arsanjan
- Bakhsh: Central
- Rural District: Shurab

Population (2006)
  - Total: 324
- Time zone: UTC+3:30 (IRST)
  - Summer (DST): UTC+4:30 (IRDT)

Dehak (Persian: دهك; also known as Dūhak) is a village in Shurab Rural District, in the Central District of Arsanjan County, Fars province, Iran. At the 2006 census, its population was 324, in 78 families.
