= Hoseynabad-e Gorgan =

Hoseynabad-e Gorgan حسين آباد گرگان
- Village
- Location within Iran
- Coordinates: 35°44′32″N 47°31′33″E
- Country: Iran
- Province: Kurdistan
- County: Bijar
- Bakhsh: Central
- Rural District: Howmeh

Population (2006)
  - Total: 66
- Time zone: UTC+3:30 (IRST)
  - Summer (DST): UTC+4:30 (IRDT)

Hoseynabad-e Gorgan (Persian: حسين آباد گرگان, also Romanized as Ḩoseynābād-e Gorgān, Ḩoseynābād Gorgān, and Ḩoseynābād-e Garagān; Ḩoseynābād and Husainābād) is a village in Howmeh Rural District, in the Central District of Bijar County, Kurdistan Province, Iran. At the 2006 census, its population was 66, in 16 families. The village is populated by Kurds.
