= Dehak, Shiraz =

Village in Fars, Iran

Dehak دهك
- Village
- Location within Iran
- Coordinates: 29°23′28″N 52°37′20″E
- Country: Iran
- Province: Fars
- County: Shiraz
- Bakhsh: Central
- Rural District: Bid Zard

Population (2006)
  - Total: 2,272
- Time zone: UTC+3:30 (IRST)
  - Summer (DST): UTC+4:30 (IRDT)

Dehak (Persian: دهك; also known as Dehak-e Dowlatābād, Dowlatābād, Dowlatābād Dehak, and Dowlat Abad-e Sarvestan) is a village in Bid Zard Rural District, in the Central District of Shiraz County, Fars province, Iran. At the 2006 census, its population was 2,272, in 586 families.
