= Hoseynabad, Saduq =

Hoseynabad حسين اباد
- Village
- Location within Iran
- Coordinates: 32°02′56″N 54°13′45″E
- Country: Iran
- Province: Yazd
- County: Saduq
- Bakhsh: Central
- Rural District: Rostaq

Population (2006)
  - Total: 81
- Time zone: UTC+3:30 (IRST)
  - Summer (DST): UTC+4:30 (IRDT)

Hoseynabad (Persian: حسين اباد, also Romanized as Ḩoseynābād; also known as Husainābād) is a village in Rostaq Rural District, in the Central District of Saduq County, Yazd Province, Iran. At the 2006 census, its population was 81, in 27 families.
