= Hoseynabad-e Pur Akbari =

Hoseynabad-e Pur Akbari حسينابادپوراکبري
- Village
- Location within Iran
- Coordinates: 32°14′00″N 54°12′00″E
- Country: Iran
- Province: Yazd
- County: Saduq
- Bakhsh: Central
- Rural District: Rostaq

Population (2006)
  - Total: 25
- Time zone: UTC+3:30 (IRST)
  - Summer (DST): UTC+4:30 (IRDT)

Hoseynabad-e Pur Akbari (Persian: حسينابادپوراکبري, also Romanized as Ḩoseynābād-e Pūr Ākbarī; also known as Ḩoseynābād and Husainābād) is a village in Rostaq Rural District, in the Central District of Saduq County, Yazd Province, Iran. At the 2006 census, its population was 25, in 13 families.
