= Hoseynabad-e Sarzeh =

Hoseynabad-e Sarzeh حسين ابادسرزه
- Village
- Location within Iran
- Coordinates: 32°47′23″N 59°35′14″E
- Country: Iran
- Province: South Khorasan
- County: Sarbisheh
- Bakhsh: Mud
- Rural District: Mud

Population (2006)
  - Total: 66
- Time zone: UTC+3:30 (IRST)
  - Summer (DST): UTC+4:30 (IRDT)

Hoseynabad-e Sarzeh (Persian: حسين ابادسرزه, also Romanized as Ḩoseynābād-e Sarzeh; also known as Ḩoseynābād, Ḩoseynābād Larzeh, and Husainābād) is a village in Mud Rural District, Mud District, Sarbisheh County, South Khorasan Province, Iran. At the 2006 census, its population was 66, in 20 families.
