= Bibi Sakineh Rural District =

Rural district in Tehran province, Iran

Bibi Sakineh Rural District Persian: دهستان بي بي سكينه
- Rural District
- Location within Iran
- Coordinates: 35°41′N 50°49′E
- Country: Iran
- Province: Tehran
- County: Malard
- District: Safadasht
- Established: 1987
- Capital: Safadasht

Population (2016)
  - Total: 17,399
- Time zone: UTC+3:30 (IRST)

Bibi Sakineh Rural District (Persian: دهستان بي بي سكينه) is in Safadasht District of Malard County, Tehran province, Iran. It is administered from the city of Safadasht. (Note: Formerly Shahrabad)

== History ==
Bibi Sakineh Rural District was established in 1987 as one of the rural districts of Karaj County in Tehran Province, with Shahrabad as its administrative center. The decree establishing the rural district listed 26 villages, farms, and other locations within its boundaries.

In 1998, the villages of Shahrabad, Hesar-e Tahmasab, Abadiyeh, and Nasirabad were merged and converted into the city of Safadasht.

In 2009, Bibi Sakineh Rural District became part of the newly established Safadasht District, which was created within the newly established Malard County of Tehran Province.

== Demographics ==
=== Population ===
At the time of the 2006 National Census, the rural district's population (as a part of the former Malard District in Shahriar County) was 16,003 in 3,894 households. There were 17,740 inhabitants in 4,804 households at the following census of 2011, by which time the district had been separated from the county in the establishment of Malard County. The rural district was transferred to the new Safadasht District. The 2016 census measured the population of the rural district as 17,399 in 4,987 households. The most populous of its 17 villages was Amirabad, with 5,221 people.

=== Other villages in the rural district ===
- Ali Bayat
- Arastu
- Argheshabad
- Dehak
- Kushkak
- Mehrdasht
- Yusefabad-e Qavam
