= Hoseynabad-e Gavahi =

Hosseinabad-e Gavahi حسين آباد گواهي
- Village
- Location within Iran
- Coordinates: 32°46′05″N 59°36′02″E
- Country: Iran
- Province: South Khorasan
- County: Sarbisheh
- Bakhsh: Mud
- Rural District: Mud

Population (2006)
  - Total: 50
- Time zone: UTC+3:30 (IRST)
  - Summer (DST): UTC+4:30 (IRDT)

Hoseynabad-e Gavahi (Persian: حسين ابادگواهي, also Romanized as Ḩoseynābād-e Gavāhī, Hosein Abad Gavahi, Ḩoseynābād-e Gavānī, and Ḩoseynābād Gavāhī; also known as Husainābād) is a village in Mud Rural District, Mud District, Sarbisheh County, South Khorasan Province, Iran. At the 2006 census, its population was 50, in 19 families.
