= Husainpur, Firozabad =

Village in Uttar Pradesh, India

Husainpur
- Village
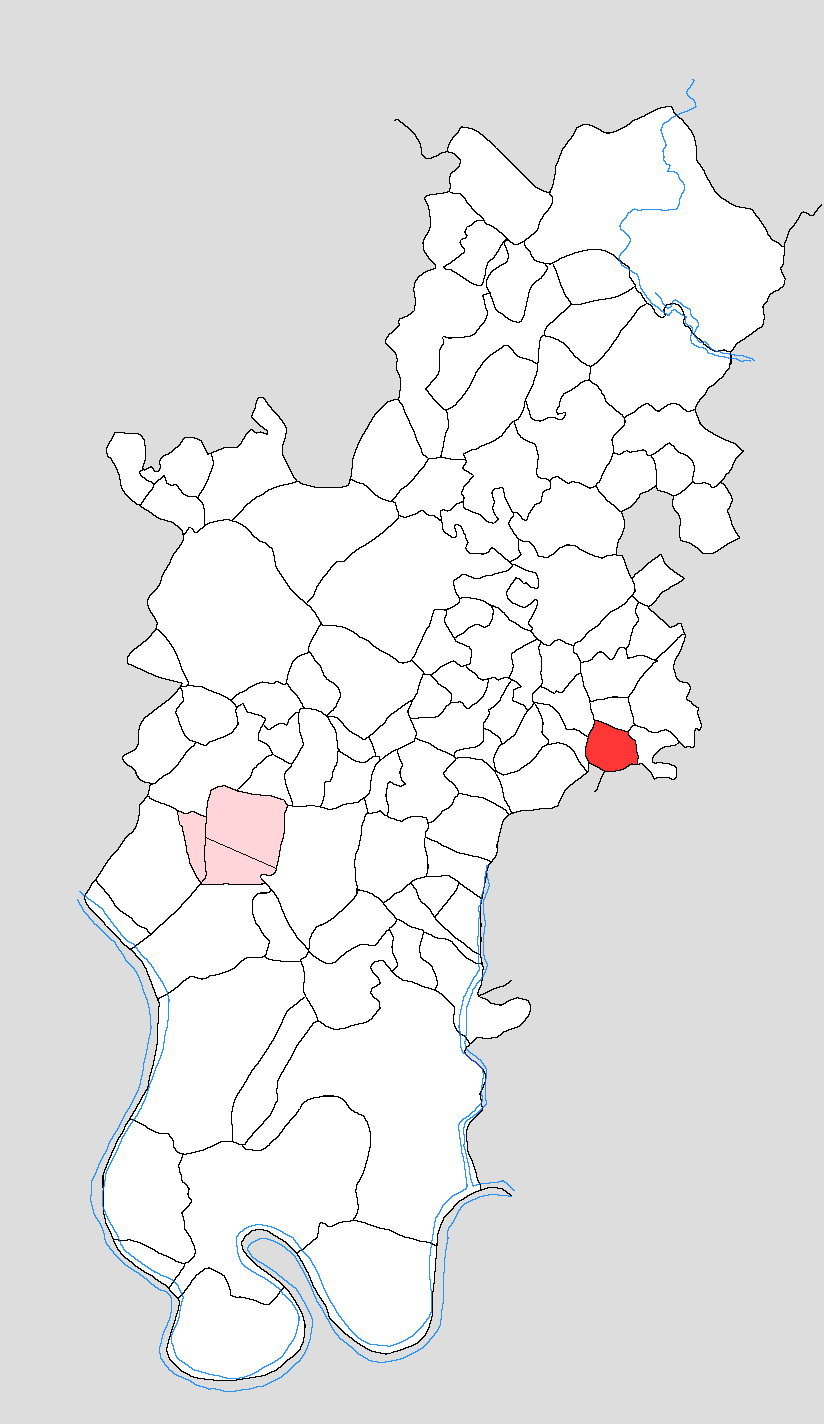
- Map showing Husainpur in Tundla block

- Location in Uttar Pradesh, India
- Coordinates: 27.23528°N 78.34311°E
- Country: India
- State: Uttar Pradesh
- District: Firozabad
- Tehsil: Tundla

Area
  - Total: 1.498 km^{2} (0.578 sq mi)

Population (2011)
  - Total: 1,102
  - Density: 735.6/km^{2} (1,905/sq mi)
- Time zone: UTC+5:30 (IST)

Husainpur (Husainpur) is a village in Tundla block of Firozabad district, Uttar Pradesh. As of 2011, it has a population of 1,102, in 199 households.

== Demographics ==
As of 2011, Husainpur had a population of 1,102, in 199 households. This population was 54.9% male (605) and 45.1% female (497). The 0-6 age group numbered 129 (82 male and 47 female), making up 11.7% of the total population. 146 residents were members of Scheduled Castes, or 13.2% of the total.

The 1981 census recorded Husainpur (as "Husanpur") as having a population of 742 people (395 male and 347 female), in 130 households and 238 physical houses. It was then counted as part of Kotla block.

The 1961 census recorded Husainpur as comprising 1 hamlet, with a total population of 609 people (310 male and 299 female), in 106 households and 85 physical houses. The area of the village was given as 370 acres and it was then counted as part of Kotla block.

== Infrastructure ==
As of 2011, Husainpur had 1 primary school and 1 primary health centre. Drinking water was provided by hand pump and tube well/borehole; there were no public toilets. The village did not have a post office or public library; there was at least some access to electricity for all purposes. Streets were made of pakka materials.
