= Hoseynabad-e Derakhti =

Hoseynabad-e Derakhti حسين اباددرختي
- Village
- Location within Iran
- Coordinates: 28°59′18″N 58°42′14″E
- Country: Iran
- Province: Kerman
- County: Narmashir
- Bakhsh: Central
- Rural District: Posht Rud

Population (2006)
  - Total: 321
- Time zone: UTC+3:30 (IRST)
  - Summer (DST): UTC+4:30 (IRDT)

Hoseynabad-e Derakhti (Persian: حسين اباددرختي, also Romanized as Ḩoseynābād-e Derakhtī and Ḩoseynābād-e Darakhtī; also known as Husainābād) is a village in Posht Rud Rural District, in the Central District of Narmashir County, Kerman Province, Iran. At the 2006 census, its population was 321, in 86 families.
