= Hoseynabad, Dorud =

Hoseynabad حسين آباد
- Village
- Location within Iran
- Coordinates: 33°36′15″N 48°59′36″E
- Country: Iran
- Province: Lorestan
- County: Dorud
- Bakhsh: Central
- Rural District: Dorud

Population (2006)
  - Total: 82
- Time zone: UTC+3:30 (IRST)
  - Summer (DST): UTC+4:30 (IRDT)

Hoseynabad (Persian: حسين آباد, also Romanized as Ḩoseynābād and Husainābād) is a village in Dorud Rural District, in the Central District of Dorud County, Lorestan Province, Iran. At the 2006 census, its population was 82, in 17 families.
