= Hoseynabad, Jam =

Hoseynabad حسين اباد
- Village
- Location within Iran
- Coordinates: 27°52′39″N 52°15′54″E
- Country: Iran
- Province: Bushehr
- County: Jam
- Bakhsh: Central
- Rural District: Kuri

Population (2006)
  - Total: 173
- Time zone: UTC+3:30 (IRST)
  - Summer (DST): UTC+4:30 (IRDT)

Hoseynabad (Persian: حسين اباد, also Romanized as Ḩoseynābād and Hosein Abad; also known as Husainābād) is a village in Kuri Rural District, in the Central District of Jam County, Bushehr Province, Iran. At the 2006 census, its population was 173, in 42 families.
