= Hussainpur, SBS Nagar =

Hussainpur
- Village
- Location in Punjab, India Hussainpur (India)
- Coordinates: 31.0037439°N 76.1046104°E
- Country: India
- State: Punjab
- District: Shaheed Bhagat Singh Nagar

Government
  - Type: Panchayat raj
  - Body: Gram panchayat
- Elevation: 355 m (1,165 ft)

Population (2011)
  - Total: 1,226
- Sex ratio 653/573 ♂/♀

Languages
  - Official: Punjabi
- Time zone: UTC+5:30 (IST)
- PIN: 144517
- Telephone code: 01823
- ISO 3166 code: IN-PB
- Post office: Kahlon
- Website: nawanshahr.nic.in

Hussainpur is a village in Shaheed Bhagat Singh Nagar district of Punjab State, India. It is located 5.7 kilometres (3.5 mi) away from Rahon, 15 kilometres (9.3 mi) from Nawanshahr, 16 kilometres (9.9 mi) from the district headquarter Shaheed Bhagat Singh Nagar and 85 kilometres (53 mi) from state capital Chandigarh. The village is administrated by Sarpanch an elected representative of the village.

== Demography ==
As of 2011, Hussainpur has a total number of 232 houses and population of 1226 of which 653 include are males while 573 are females according to the report published by Census India in 2011. The literacy rate of Hussainpur is 77.24%, higher than the state average of 75.84%. The population of children under the age of 6 years is 110 which is 8.97% of total population of Hussainpur, and child sex ratio is approximately 833 as compared to Punjab state average of 846.

Most of the people are from Schedule Caste which constitutes 77.41% of total population in Hussainpur. The town does not have any Schedule Tribe population so far.

As per the report published by Census India in 2011, 628 people were engaged in work activities out of the total population of Hussainpur which includes 402 males and 226 females. According to census survey report 2011, 57.32% workers describe their work as main work and 42.68% workers are involved in Marginal activity providing livelihood for less than 6 months.

== Education ==
KC Engineering College and Doaba Khalsa Trust Group Of Institutions are the nearest colleges. Industrial Training Institute for women (ITI Nawanshahr) is 16.5 kilometres (10.3 mi) and Lovely Professional University is 60 kilometres (37 mi) away from the village.

== Transport ==
Banga railway station is the nearest train station however, Garhshankar Junction railway station is 27 kilometres (17 mi) away from the village. Sahnewal Airport is the nearest domestic airport which located 42 kilometres (26 mi) away in Ludhiana and the nearest international airport is located in Chandigarh also Sri Guru Ram Dass Jee International Airport is the second nearest airport which is 168 kilometres (104 mi) away in Amritsar.

== See also ==
- List of villages in India
