= Hüseynabad =

Village in Lerik District, Azerbaijan

Coordinates: 38°38′N 48°20′E

Hüseynabad is a village in the municipality of Kələxan in the Lerik Rayon of Azerbaijan.
