= Dehak, Isfahan =

Dehak دهك
- Village
- Location within Iran
- Coordinates: 31°50′51″N 51°56′50″E
- Country: Iran
- Province: Isfahan
- County: Shahreza
- Bakhsh: Central
- Rural District: Manzariyeh

Population (2006)
  - Total: 157
- Time zone: UTC+3:30 (IRST)
  - Summer (DST): UTC+4:30 (IRDT)

Dehak (Persian: دهك, also Romanized as Dahak) is a village in Manzariyeh Rural District, in the Central District of Shahreza County, Isfahan Province, Iran. At the 2006 census, its population was 157, in 54 families.
