= Husainabad, Raebareli =

Husainabad Husainābād
- Village
- Map showing Husainabad (#565) in Khiron CD block

- Location in Uttar Pradesh, India
- Coordinates: 26.291856°N 80.912078°E
- Country: India
- State: Uttar Pradesh
- District: Raebareli

Area
  - Total: 0.596 km^{2} (0.230 sq mi)

Population (2011)
  - Total: 862
  - Density: 1,450/km^{2} (3,750/sq mi)

Languages
  - Official: Hindi
- Time zone: UTC+5:30 (IST)
- Vehicle registration: UP-35

Husainabad is a village in Khiron block of Rae Bareli district, Uttar Pradesh, India. It is located 11 km from Lalganj, the tehsil headquarters. As of 2011, it has a population of 862 people, in 158 households. It has 1 primary school and no healthcare facilities and it does hosts a weekly haat but not a permanent market. It belongs to the nyaya panchayat of Khiron.

The 1951 census recorded Husainabad as comprising 1 hamlet, with a total population of 261 people (129 male and 132 female), in 54 households and 43 physical houses. The area of the village was given as 153 acres. 5 residents were literate, all male. The village was listed as belonging to the pargana of Khiron and the thana of Gurbakshganj.

The 1961 census recorded Husainabad as comprising 1 hamlet, with a total population of 327 people (160 male and 167 female), in 60 households and 52 physical houses. The area of the village was given as 153 acres.

The 1981 census recorded Husainabad as having a population of 495 people, in 83 households, and having an area of 59.49 hectares. The main staple foods were given as wheat and rice.

The 1991 census recorded Husainabad (as "Husenabad") as having a total population of 624 people (300 male and 324 female), in 97 households and 96 physical houses. The area of the village was listed as 57 hectares. Members of the 0-6 age group numbered 150, or 24% of the total; this group was 50% male (75) and 40% female (75). Members of scheduled castes made up 12.5% of the village's population, while no members of scheduled tribes were recorded. The literacy rate of the village was 22% (109 men and 29 women). 162 people were classified as main workers (145 men and 17 women), while 0 people were classified as marginal workers; the remaining 462 residents were non-workers. The breakdown of main workers by employment category was as follows: 53 cultivators (i.e. people who owned or leased their own land); 85 agricultural labourers (i.e. people who worked someone else's land in return for payment); 0 workers in livestock, forestry, fishing, hunting, plantations, orchards, etc.; 0 in mining and quarrying; 0 household industry workers; 8 workers employed in other manufacturing, processing, service, and repair roles; 0 construction workers; 3 employed in trade and commerce; 0 employed in transport, storage, and communications; and 13 in other services.
