= Malard-e Shomali Rural District =

Rural district in Tehran province, Iran

Malard-e Shomali Rural District Persian: دهستان ملارد شمالی
- Rural District
- Location within Iran
- Coordinates: 35°40′N 50°58′E
- Country: Iran
- Province: Tehran
- County: Malard
- District: Central
- Established: 1987
- Capital: Malard

Population (2016)
  - Total: 31,362
- Time zone: UTC+3:30 (IRST)

Malard-e Shomali Rural District (Persian: دهستان ملارد شمالی) (Note: Formerly Malard Rural District (دهستان ملارد)) is in the Central District of Malard County, Tehran province, Iran. It is administered from the city of Malard.

== Demographics ==
=== Population ===
At the time of the 2006 National Census, the rural district's population (as Malard Rural District of the former Malard District in Shahriar County) was 27,479 in 6,965 households. There were 31,288 inhabitants in 8,532 households at the following census of 2011, by which time the district had been separated from the county in the establishment of Malard County. The rural district was transferred to the new Central District and renamed Malard-e Shomali Rural District. The 2016 census measured the population of the rural district as 31,362 in 9,126 households. The most populous of its 14 villages was Shahrak-e Jafariyeh, with 9,452 people.

=== Other villages in the rural district ===
- Khvoshnam
- Lomabad
- Malard-e Vilay-ye Jonubi
- Mehr Azin
- Mehrchin
- Qaleh-ye Faramarzi
- Qeshlaq-e Malard
