= Akhtarabad Rural District =

Rural district in Tehran province, Iran

Akhtarabad Rural District Persian: دهستان اخترآباد
- Rural District
- Location within Iran
- Coordinates: 35°35′N 50°37′E
- Country: Iran
- Province: Tehran
- County: Malard
- District: Safadasht
- Established: 1987
- Capital: Akhtarabad

Population (2016)
  - Total: 2,576
- Time zone: UTC+3:30 (IRST)

Akhtarabad Rural District (Persian: دهستان اخترآباد) is in Safadasht District of Malard County, Tehran province, Iran. Its capital is the village of Akhtarabad.

== Demographics ==
=== Population ===
At the time of the 2006 National Census, the rural district's population (as a part of the former Malard District in Shahriar County) was 3,598 in 876 households. There were 3,166 inhabitants in 809 households at the following census of 2011, by which time the district had been separated from the county in the establishment of Malard County. The rural district was transferred to the new Safadasht District. The 2016 census measured the population of the rural district as 2,576 in 784 households. The most populous of its 52 villages was Akhtarabad, with 430 people.

=== Other villages in the rural district ===
- Chaqu-ye Akhvani
- Gomorgan
- Guy Bolagh
- Hajjiabad-e Sofla
- Mahmudabad
- Mohammadabad
- Qeshlaq-e Amirabad
- Zarrinabad
