= Safadasht District =

District in Tehran province, Iran

Safadasht District Persian: بخش صفادشت
- District
- Location within Iran
- Coordinates: 35°36′N 50°38′E
- Country: Iran
- Province: Tehran
- County: Malard
- Established: 2009
- Capital: Safadasht

Population (2016)
  - Total: 52,451
- Time zone: UTC+3:30 (IRST)

Safadasht District (Persian: بخش صفادشت) is in Malard County, Tehran province, Iran. Its capital is the city of Safadasht.

== History ==
In 2009, Malard District was separated from Shahriar County in the establishment of Malard County, which was divided into two districts of two rural districts each, with the city of Malard as its capital.

== Demographics ==
=== Population ===
At the time of the 2011 National Census, the district's population was 40,139 people in 10,957 households. The 2016 census measured the population of the district as 52,451 inhabitants in 15,458 households.

=== Administrative divisions ===
Safadasht District Population
Administrative Divisions	2011	2016
Akhtarabad RD	3,166	2,576
Bibi Sakineh RD	17,740	17,399
Safadasht (city) (Note: Formerly Shahrabad)	19,233	32,476
Total	40,139	52,451
RD = Rural District
