= Central District (Malard County) =

District in Tehran province, Iran

Central District (Malard County) Persian: بخش مرکزی شهرستان ملارد
- District
- Location within Iran
- Coordinates: 35°39′N 50°53′E
- Country: Iran
- Province: Tehran
- County: Malard
- Established: 2009
- Capital: Malard

Population (2016)
  - Total: 324,788
- Time zone: UTC+3:30 (IRST)

The Central District of Malard County (Persian: بخش مرکزی شهرستان ملارد) is in Tehran province, Iran. Its capital is the city of Malard.

== History ==
In 2009, Malard District was separated from Shahriar County in the establishment of Malard County, which was divided into two districts of two rural districts each, with Malard as its capital.

== Demographics ==
=== Population ===
At the time of the 2011 census, the district's population was 333,772 people in 97,204 households. The 2016 census measured the population of the district as 324,788 inhabitants in 99,644 households.

=== Administrative divisions ===
Central District (Malard County) Population
Administrative Divisions	2011	2016
Malard-e Jonubi RD	11,673	12,399
Malard-e Shomali RD (Note: Formerly Malard Rural District)	31,282	31,362
Malard (city)	290,817	281,027
Total	333,772	324,788
RD = Rural District
