= Malard District =

Former district in Tehran province, Iran

Malard District Persian: بخش ملارد
- Former District
- Location within Iran
- Coordinates: 35°35′N 50°39′E
- Country: Iran
- Province: Tehran
- County: Shahriar
- Established: 2001
- Capital: Malard

Population (2006)
  - Total: 291,608
- Time zone: UTC+3:30 (IRST)

Malard District (Persian: بخش ملارد) is a former administrative division of Shahriar County, Tehran province, Iran. Its capital was the city of Malard.

== History ==
In 2009, the district was separated from the county in the establishment of Malard County.

== Demographics ==
=== Population ===
At the time of the 2006 census, the district's population was 291,608 in 77,093 households.

=== Municipality ===
Khodabakhsh Mohammadzadeh Podineh is the mayor of Mallard.

=== Administrative divisions ===
Malard District Population
Administrative Divisions	2006
Akhtarabad RD	3,598
Bibi Sakineh RD	16,003
Malard RD (Note: Renamed Malard-e Shomali Rural District)	27,479
Malard (city)	228,673
Safadasht (city) (Note: Formerly Shahrabad)	15,855
Total	291,608
RD = Rural District

== Ancient Civilization Sites ==
Ancient Civilization Sites Around Malard:

- Takht-e Rostam Fire Pit from the Parthian and Sasanian Periods
- Ancient Aristotle Hill from Prehistoric Times
- Ancient Petroglyphs on Mount Kaftarlu
