= Malard County =

County in Tehran province, Iran

Malard County Persian: شهرستان ملارد
- County
- Location of Malard County in Tehran province (left, green)

- Location of Tehran province in Iran
- Coordinates: 35°35′N 50°39′E
- Country: Iran
- Province: Tehran
- Established: 2009
- Capital: Malard
- Districts: Central, Safadasht

Area
  - Total: 930.3 km^{2} (359.2 sq mi)

Population (2016)
  - Total: 377,292
  - Density: 405.6/km^{2} (1,050/sq mi)
- Time zone: UTC+3:30 (IRST)

Malard County (Persian: شهرستان ملارد) is in Tehran province, Iran. Its capital is the city of Malard.

== History ==
In 2009, Malard District was separated from Shahriar County in the establishment of Malard County, which was divided into two districts of two rural districts each, with Malard as its capital.

== Demographics ==
=== Population ===
At the time of the 2011 National Census, the county's population was 373,994 people in 108,221 households. The 2016 census measured the population of the county as 377,292 in 115,154 households.

=== Administrative divisions ===
Malard County's population history and administrative structure over two consecutive censuses are shown in the following table.

Malard County Population
Administrative Divisions	2011	2016
Central District	333,772	324,788
Malard-e Jonubi RD	11,673	12,399
Malard-e Shomali RD (Note: Formerly Malard Rural District)	31,282	31,362
Malard (city)	290,817	281,027
Safadasht District	40,139	52,451
Akhtarabad RD	3,166	2,576
Bibi Sakineh RD	17,740	17,399
Safadasht (city) (Note: Formerly Shahrabad)	19,233	32,476
Total	373,994	377,292
RD = Rural District

== Climate ==
According to the information of the State Meteorological Organization of Iran, the long-term average annual rainfall of Malard is around 179.9 mm.

== Municipality ==
Khodabakhsh Mohammadzadeh Podineh is the mayor of Mallard.

== See also ==
Media related to Malard County at Wikimedia Commons
