= Shahrabad =

Shahrabad (Persian: شهراباد) may refer to:

- Shahrabad, Kerman
- Shahrabad, alternate name of Shirabad, Maneh and Samalqan, North Khorasan province
- Shahrabad-e Khavar, North Khorasan province
- Shahrabad-e Kord, North Khorasan province
- Shahrabad, Qazvin
- Shahrabad, Razavi Khorasan
- Shahrabad, Davarzan, Razavi Khorasan province
- Shahrabad, Mashhad, Razavi Khorasan province
- Shahrabad, Nishapur, Razavi Khorasan province
- Shahrabad, Torbat-e Jam, Razavi Khorasan province
- Shahrabad, Tehran
- Shahrabad, Abarkuh, Yazd province
- Shahrabad, Bafq, Yazd province
- Shahrabad-e Ilat
- Shahrabad District
- Shahrabad Rural District (disambiguation)
