= Zargar =

Zargar (Persian: زرگر) may refer to:

- Zərgər, Azerbaijan
- Zargar, Ardabil, Iran
- Zargar-e Goli Bolaghi, Ardabil province, Iran
- Zargar, East Azerbaijan, Iran
- Zargar-e Olya, Kerman province, Iran
- Zargar, Babol, Mazandaran province, Iran
- Zargar, Semnan, Iran
- Zargar, South Khorasan, Iran
- Zargar, Qazvin, Iran

== See also ==
- Zargari (disambiguation)
