= Havar =

Village in North Khorasan province, Iran

Havar Persian: هاور
- Village
- Location within Iran
- Coordinates: 37°25′23″N 56°48′33″E
- Country: Iran
- Province: North Khorasan
- County: Samalqan
- District: Samalqan
- Rural District: Almeh

Population (2016)
  - Total: 180
- Time zone: UTC+3:30 (IRST)

Havar (Persian: هاور) (Note: Also romanized as Hāvar) is a village in Almeh Rural District of Samalqan District in Samalqan County, (Note: Formerly Maneh and Samalqan County) North Khorasan province, Iran.

== Demographics ==
=== Population ===
At the time of the 2006 National Census, the village's population was 228 in 56 households. The following census in 2011 counted 189 people in 48 households. The 2016 census measured the population of the village as 180 people in 48 households.

== Overview ==
Havar is noteworthy for marking the easternmost extremity of the highly biodiverse Caspian Hyrcanian mixed forests—most of which are to be found fringing the Caspian Sea. The spur of forest that Havar shares with the villages of Jowzak, Darkesh, and Kashanak owes its extension into the more arid regions to the east of the Caspian Sea to the trapping of moisture from the body of water by the Aladagh Mountains, which form an extension at lower altitude of the Alborz mountains to the west.

This forested area lies within the Khorasani Kurdish region of northeastern Iran and southwestern Turkmenistan. The only substantial settlement close to Havar and its neighboring villages is Bojnord, the capital of North Khorasan province.
