= Zargari =

Zargari may refer to

== Places ==
- Zargari, Afghanistan, a village in Ghazni Province, Afghanistan
- Zargari, Khyber Pakhtunkhwa, a village in Hangu District, Pakistan

== People ==
- Zargari people, a Balkan Romani ethnic group in Iran
  - Zargari Romani, the Indo-Aryan language of the Zargari people
- Zargari (surname)

== Other ==
- Zargari (game), a language game based on Persian

== See also ==
- Zargar (disambiguation)
