= Qazi Kalayeh =

Qazi Kalayeh قاضي كلايه
- Village
- Location within Iran
- Coordinates: 36°08′57″N 50°33′37″E
- Country: Iran
- Province: Qazvin
- County: Abyek
- Bakhsh: Central
- Rural District: Ziaran

Population (2006)
  - Total: 71
- Time zone: UTC+3:30 (IRST)
  - Summer (DST): UTC+4:30 (IRDT)

Qazi Kalayeh (Persian: قاضي كلايه, also Romanized as Qāẕī Kalāyeh) is a village in Ziaran Rural District, in the Central District of Abyek County, Qazvin Province, Iran. At the 2006 census, its population was 71, in 32 families.
