= Shahrabad, Qazvin =

Shahrabad شهراباد
- Village
- Location within Iran
- Coordinates: 36°00′42″N 50°10′26″E
- Country: Iran
- Province: Qazvin
- County: Abyek
- Bakhsh: Basharyat
- Rural District: Basharyat-e Gharbi

Population (2006)
  - Total: 369
- Time zone: UTC+3:30 (IRST)
  - Summer (DST): UTC+4:30 (IRDT)

Shahrabad (Persian: شهراباد, also Romanized as Shahrābād) is a village in Basharyat-e Gharbi Rural District, Basharyat District, Abyek County, Qazvin Province, Iran. At the 2006 census, its population was 369, in 98 families.

It is located around 3 Kilometres (1.9 Miles) away from the town of Shahrestan, which has a slightly larger population at 446 in the 2006 census.

Shahrabad is located in a particularly flat and dry region of Qazvin, leading to a reliance on self-supported agricultural systems which take up an area approximately 30 times larger than that of the village (which has an area of around 420 square kilometres including unused land between or near constructed housing).

Currently no street view or photo-sphere data from Google Earth is available in the village, this is partly due to the poor infrastructure in the remote area in which the village is located.
