= Halalabad =

Halalabad or Helalabad (Persian: هلال اباد) may refer to:

- Helalabad, Fars
- Halalabad, Abyek, Qazvin
- Halalabad, Qazvin
