= Khazinabad =

Khazinabad خزين اباد
- Village
- Location within Iran
- Coordinates: 36°09′06″N 50°21′29″E
- Country: Iran
- Province: Qazvin
- County: Abyek
- Bakhsh: Central
- Rural District: Kuhpayeh-e Sharqi

Population (2006)
  - Total: 25
- Time zone: UTC+3:30 (IRST)
  - Summer (DST): UTC+4:30 (IRDT)

Khazinabad (Persian: خزين اباد, also Romanized as Khazīnābād, Khaz'anābād, Khazīnehābād, and Khuzānābād) is a village in Kuhpayeh-e Sharqi Rural District, in the Central District of Abyek County, Qazvin Province, Iran. At the 2006 census, its population was 25, in 7 families.
