= Chaman-e Bid =

Chaman-e Bid or Chaman Bid (Persian: چمن بيد) may refer to:

- Chaman-e Bid, Afghanistan
- Chaman Bid, Chaharmahal and Bakhtiari, Iran
- Chaman Bid, Fars, Iran
- Chaman-e Bid, North Khorasan, Iran
