= Kalayeh, Abyek =

Kalayeh كلايه
- Village
- Location within Iran
- Coordinates: 36°06′50″N 50°38′28″E
- Country: Iran
- Province: Qazvin
- County: Abyek
- Bakhsh: Central
- Rural District: Ziaran

Population (2006)
  - Total: 23
- Time zone: UTC+3:30 (IRST)
  - Summer (DST): UTC+4:30 (IRDT)

Kalayeh (Persian: كلايه, also Romanized as Kalāyeh) is a village in Ziaran Rural District, in the Central District of Abyek County, Qazvin Province, Iran. At the 2006 census, its population was 23, in 5 families.
