= Rais al-Mojahedin =

Iranian revolutionary

Mirza Hassan Sheikh al-Islam Rais al-Mojahedin
- میرزا حسن شیخ الاسلام
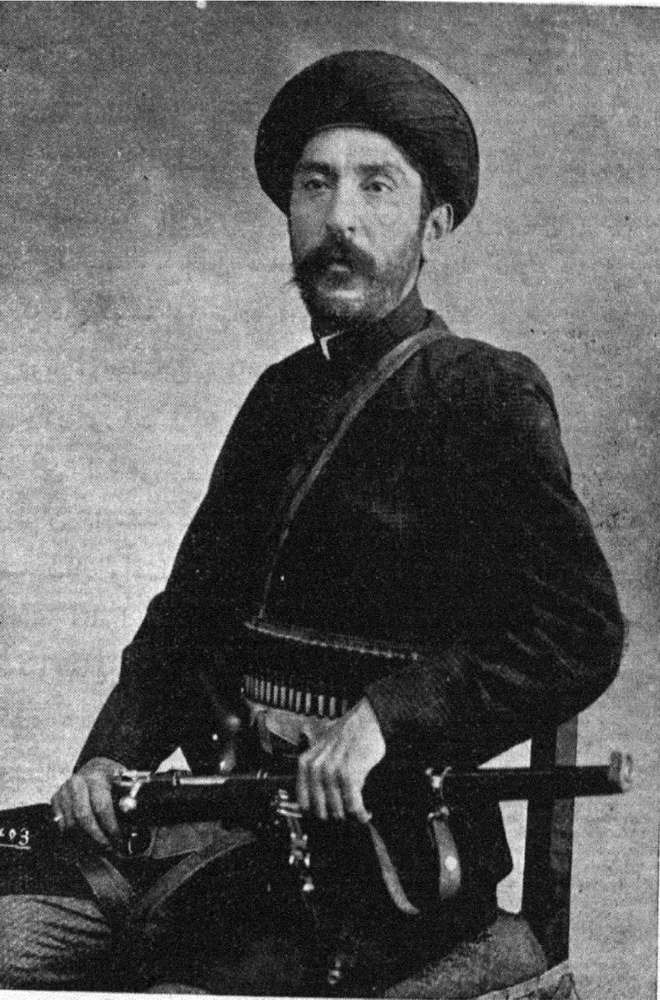
- Born: Between 1861 and 1866; Qazvin
- Died: 15 September 1918
- Burial place: Abyek, Tomb of Rais al-Mojahedin
- Known for: Leading the constitutional revolution in Qazvin
- Children: 3 daughters
- Father: Mirza Masoud Sheikh al-Islam

Mirza Hassan Sheikh al-Islam (Persian: میرزا حسن شیخ الاسلام), better known as Rais al-Mojahedin (Persian: رئیس المجاهدین) was an Iranian revolutionary involved in the Iranian Constitutional Revolution.

== Life ==
He was born in Qazvin, sometime between 1861 and 1866, to an influential cleric named Mirza Masoud Sheikh al-Islam. He made his studies in the Sheikh al-Islam Madrasa and then in Karbala and was later appointed by Mozaffar ad-Din Shah Qajar as the leader of the clergy in Qazvin. He was one of the founders of the Omid School, the first modern school in Qazvin.

=== Constitutional revolution ===
He led the Association of Mojaheds of Qazvin which was one of the many associations created after the constitutional revolution, and maintained a small military force of around 100-300 soldiers in Qazvin. During the Incident of Toopkhane Square when the annulment of the parliament was a serious threat, this force entered Tehran which, along with the forces from Saveh, made the Shah temporarily retreat from his positions and swear fealty to the constitution, which made the forced return to Qazvin.

After the bombardment of the Iranian parliament, telegraph lines were cut by the forces of the Shah to prevent news from reaching other provinces, constitutionalists transmitted news via sending letters to Rais al-Mojahedin, who then telegraphed them to various cities, and vice versa.

Following the bombardment, the Shah ordered the arrest of Rais al-Mojahedin, which made him flee to Istanbul, and from there to France, Britain and Russia. He spent 8 months abroad, and had contact via telegraph and letters with constitutionalists in Najaf, specially with Akhund Khurasani and with constitutionalists living in Istanbul and the Caucasus.

He returned to Qazvin after the capture of the city by the constitutionalist forces, and led one of the 11 divisions of the constitutionalist force, which then made its move towards Tehran. During the capture of Tehran, Rais al-Mojahedin lost 32 of the 250 men he commanded. His actions during the capture of Tehran include the capture of the British telegraph facilities.

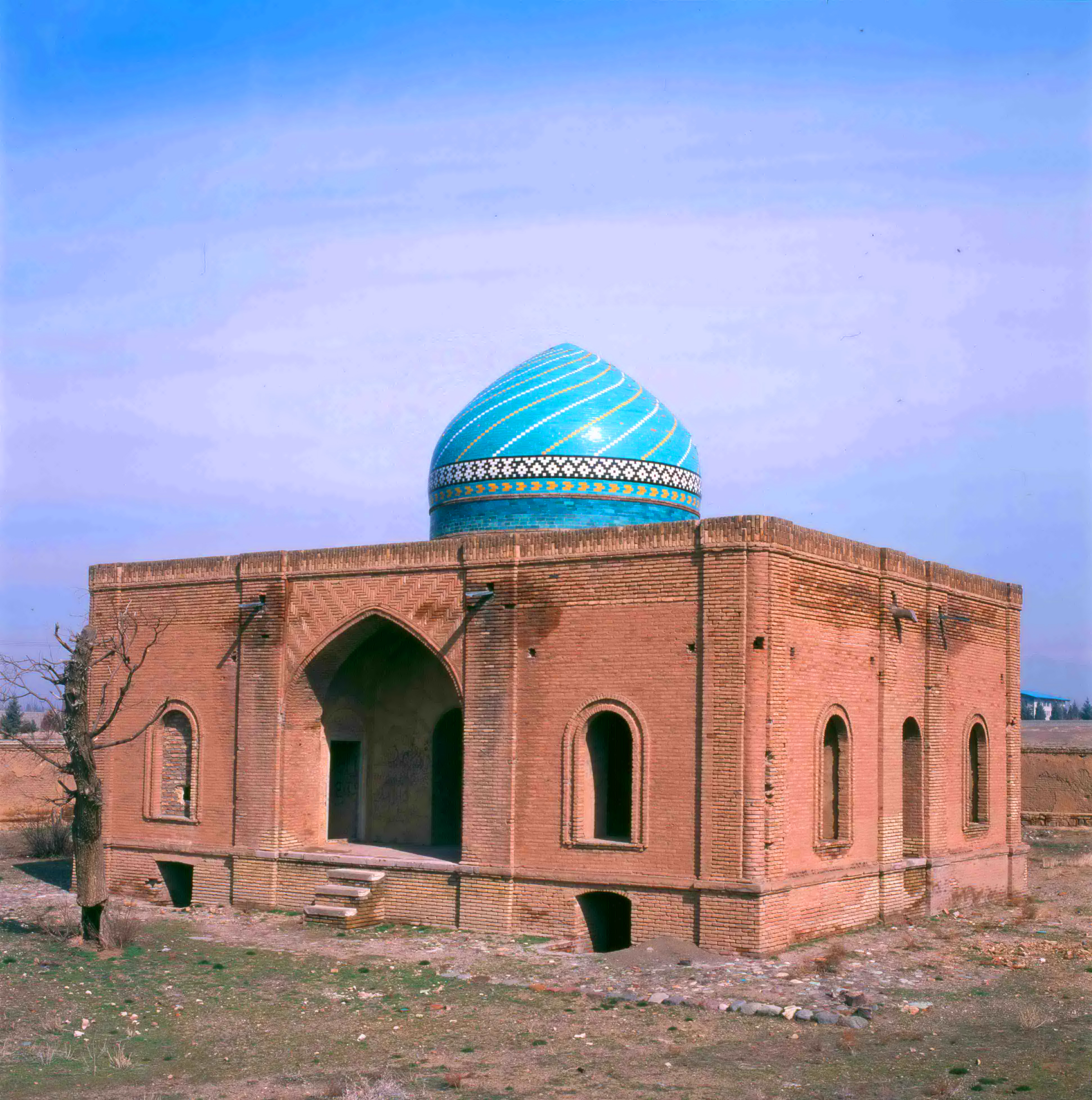
Burial place of Rais al-Mojahedin

== Death ==
He died in the night of Arafa(15 September) of 1918, and was buried in his personal property in Yanesabad in Abyek. He may have been killed by poisoning.
