= Gil Zur =

Village in Qazvin province, Iran

Gil Zur Persian: گيل زور
- Village
- Location within Iran
- Coordinates: 36°04′17″N 50°07′21″E
- Country: Iran
- Province: Qazvin
- County: Abyek
- District: Basharyat
- Rural District: Basharyat-e Gharbi

Population (2016)
  - Total: 518
- Time zone: UTC+3:30 (IRST)

Gil Zur (Persian: گيل زور) (Note: Also romanized as Gīl Zūr; also known as Gol Zūr and Golzūr) is a village in Basharyat-e Gharbi Rural District (Note: Formerly Basharyat Rural District) of Basharyat District in Abyek County, Qazvin province, Iran.

== Demographics ==
=== Population ===
At the time of the 2006 National Census, the village's population was 566 in 135 households. The following census in 2011 counted 603 people in 176 households. The 2016 census measured the population of the village as 518 people in 162 households.
