= Hajji Tappeh =

Village in Qazvin province, Iran

Hajji Tappeh Persian: حاجی تپه
- Village
- Location within Iran
- Coordinates: 36°06′10″N 50°18′14″E
- Country: Iran
- Province: Qazvin
- County: Abyek
- District: Basharyat
- Rural District: Basharyat-e Sharqi

Population (2016)
  - Total: 694
- Time zone: UTC+3:30 (IRST)

Hajji Tappeh (Persian: حاجی تپه) (Note: Also romanized as Ḩājjī Tappeh; also known as Ḩājjī Tappehābād) is a village in Basharyat-e Sharqi Rural District of Basharyat District in Abyek County, Qazvin province, Iran.

== Demographics ==
=== Population ===
At the time of the 2006 National Census, the village's population was 1,005 in 253 households. The following census in 2011 counted 760 people in 229 households. The 2016 census measured the population of the village as 694 people in 220 households.
