= Aqchari =

Village in Qazvin province, Iran

Aqchari Persian: آقچری
- Village
- Location within Iran
- Coordinates: 36°07′47″N 50°35′30″E
- Country: Iran
- Province: Qazvin
- County: Abyek
- District: Central
- Rural District: Ziaran

Population (2016)
  - Total: 166
- Time zone: UTC+3:30 (IRST)

Aqchari (Persian: آقچری) (Note: Also romanized as Āqcharī; also known as Āqjarī) is a village in Ziaran Rural District of the Central District in Abyek County, Qazvin province, Iran.

== Demographics ==
=== Population ===
At the time of the 2006 National Census, the village's population was 111 in 51 households. The following census in 2011 counted 235 people in 96 households. The 2016 census measured the population of the village as 166 people in 82 households.
