= Kuhpayeh Rural District =

Kuhpayeh Rural District (Persian: دهستان كوهپايه) may refer to:

- Kuhpayeh Rural District (Isfahan Province)
- Kuhpayeh Rural District (Markazi Province)
- Kuhpayeh Rural District (Razavi Khorasan Province)

== See also ==
- Kuhpayeh-e Gharbi Rural District
- Kuhpayeh-e Sharqi Rural District
