= Now Deh, Abyek =

Village in Qazvin province, Iran

Now Deh Persian: نوده
- Village
- Location within Iran
- Coordinates: 36°14′35″N 50°23′03″E
- Country: Iran
- Province: Qazvin
- County: Abyek
- District: Central
- Rural District: Kuhpayeh-e Gharbi

Population (2016)
  - Total: 51
- Time zone: UTC+3:30 (IRST)

Now Deh (Persian: نوده) is a village in Kuhpayeh-e Gharbi Rural District of the Central District in Abyek County, Qazvin province, Iran.

== Demographics ==
=== Population ===
At the time of the 2006 National Census, the village's population was 119 in 48 households. The following census in 2011 counted 66 people in 23 households. The 2016 census measured the population of the village as 51 people in 25 households.
