= Baqerabad-e Kord =

Village in Qazvin province, Iran

Baqerabad-e Kord Persian: باقرآباد کرد
- Village
- Location within Iran
- Coordinates: 36°05′25″N 50°21′42″E
- Country: Iran
- Province: Qazvin
- County: Abyek
- District: Basharyat
- Rural District: Basharyat-e Sharqi

Population (2016)
  - Total: 389
- Time zone: UTC+3:30 (IRST)

Baqerabad-e Kord (Persian: باقرآباد کرد) (Note: Also romanized as Bāqerābād-e Kord; also known as Bāqerābād) is a village in Basharyat-e Sharqi Rural District of Basharyat District in Abyek County, Qazvin province, Iran.

== Demographics ==
=== Population ===
At the time of the 2006 National Census, the village's population was 439 in 107 households. The following census in 2011 counted 416 people in 123 households. The 2016 census measured the population of the village as 389 people in 117 households.
