= Qarah Qobad, Qazvin =

Village in Qazvin province, Iran

Qarah Qobad Persian: قره قباد
- Village
- Location within Iran
- Coordinates: 36°02′45″N 50°19′43″E
- Country: Iran
- Province: Qazvin
- County: Abyek
- District: Basharyat
- Rural District: Basharyat-e Sharqi

Population (2016)
  - Total: 434
- Time zone: UTC+3:30 (IRST)

Qarah Qobad (Persian: قره قباد) (Note: Also romanized as Qarah Qobād and Qareh Qobād) is a village in Basharyat-e Sharqi Rural District of Basharyat District in Abyek County, Qazvin province, Iran.

== Demographics ==
=== Population ===
At the time of the 2006 National Census, the village's population was 499 in 122 households. The following census in 2011 counted 431 people in 124 households. The 2016 census measured the population of the village as 434 people in 136 households.
