= Kia Deh, Qazvin =

Kia Deh كياده
- Village
- Location within Iran
- Coordinates: 36°14′35″N 50°23′10″E
- Country: Iran
- Province: Qazvin
- County: Abyek
- Bakhsh: Central
- Rural District: Kuhpayeh-e Gharbi

Population (2006)
  - Total: 66
- Time zone: UTC+3:30 (IRST)
  - Summer (DST): UTC+4:30 (IRDT)

Kia Deh (Persian: كياده, also Romanized as Kīā Deh) is a village in Kuhpayeh-e Gharbi Rural District, in the Central District of Abyek County, Qazvin Province, Iran. In the 2006 census, its population was 66.
