= Hoseynabad-e Kord =

Village in Qazvin province, Iran

Hoseynabad-e Kord Persian: حسین‌آباد کرد
- Village
- Location within Iran
- Coordinates: 36°00′12″N 50°29′33″E
- Country: Iran
- Province: Qazvin
- County: Abyek
- District: Central
- Rural District: Ziaran

Population (2016)
  - Total: 362
- Time zone: UTC+3:30 (IRST)

Hoseynabad-e Kord (Persian: حسین‌آباد کرد) (Note: Also romanized as Ḩoseynābād-e Kord; also known as Ḩoseynābād) is a village in Ziaran Rural District of the Central District in Abyek County, Qazvin province, Iran.

== Demographics ==
=== Population ===
At the time of the 2006 National Census, the village's population was 324 in 84 households. The following census in 2011 counted 347 people in 88 households. The 2016 census measured the population of the village as 362 people in 113 households.
