= Khorram Poshteh =

Village in Qazvin province, Iran

Khorram Poshteh Persian: خرمپشته
- Village
- Location within Iran
- Coordinates: 36°04′07″N 50°08′56″E
- Country: Iran
- Province: Qazvin
- County: Abyek
- District: Basharyat
- Rural District: Basharyat-e Gharbi

Population (2016)
  - Total: 1,151
- Time zone: UTC+3:30 (IRST)

Khorram Poshteh (Persian: خرمپشته) is a village in Basharyat-e Gharbi Rural District (Note: Formerly Basharyat Rural District) of Basharyat District in Abyek County, Qazvin province, Iran.

== Demographics ==
=== Population ===
At the time of the 2006 National Census, the village's population was 1,094 in 272 households. The following census in 2011 counted 1,183 people in 353 households. The 2016 census measured the population of the village as 1,151 people in 342 households.
