= Mahmudian =

Village in Qazvin province, Iran

Mahmudian Persian: محموديان
- Village
- Location within Iran
- Coordinates: 36°03′43″N 50°18′50″E
- Country: Iran
- Province: Qazvin
- County: Abyek
- District: Basharyat
- Rural District: Basharyat-e Sharqi

Population (2016)
  - Total: 459
- Time zone: UTC+3:30 (IRST)

Mahmudian (Persian: محموديان) (Note: Also romanized as Maḩmūdīān; also known as Maḩmūdābād) is a village in Basharyat-e Sharqi Rural District of Basharyat District in Abyek County, Qazvin province, Iran.

== Demographics ==
=== Population ===
At the time of the 2006 National Census, the village's population was 525 in 142 households. The following census in 2011 counted 491 people in 150 households. The 2016 census measured the population of the village as 459 people in 148 households.
