= Jazmeh =

Village in Qazvin province, Iran

Jazmeh Persian: جزمه
- Village
- Location within Iran
- Coordinates: 36°07′05″N 50°25′38″E
- Country: Iran
- Province: Qazvin
- County: Abyek
- District: Central
- Rural District: Kuhpayeh-e Sharqi

Population (2016)
  - Total: 251
- Time zone: UTC+3:30 (IRST)

Jazmeh (Persian: جزمه) is a village in Kuhpayeh-e Sharqi Rural District of the Central District in Abyek County, Qazvin province, Iran.

== Demographics ==
=== Population ===
At the time of the 2006 National Census, the village's population was 379 in 104 households. The following census in 2011 counted 295 people in 87 households. The 2016 census measured the population of the village as 251 people in 85 households.
