= Falizan =

Village in Qazvin province, Iran

Falizan Persian: فاليزان
- Village
- Location within Iran
- Coordinates: 36°10′23″N 50°21′01″E
- Country: Iran
- Province: Qazvin
- County: Abyek
- District: Central
- Rural District: Kuhpayeh-e Sharqi

Population (2016)
  - Total: 265
- Time zone: UTC+3:30 (IRST)

Falizan (Persian: فاليزان) (Note: Also romanized as Fālīzān; also known as Qālīzān) is a village in Kuhpayeh-e Sharqi Rural District of the Central District in Abyek County, Qazvin province, Iran.

== Demographics ==
=== Population ===
At the time of the 2006 National Census, the village's population was 366 in 101 households. The following census in 2011 counted 337 people in 99 households. The 2016 census measured the population of the village as 265 people in 73 households.
