= Behjatabad, Qazvin =

Village in Qazvin province, Iran

Behjatabad Persian: بهجت اباد
- Village
- Location within Iran
- Coordinates: 36°08′44″N 50°22′36″E
- Country: Iran
- Province: Qazvin
- County: Abyek
- District: Central
- Rural District: Kuhpayeh-e Sharqi

Population (2016)
  - Total: 311
- Time zone: UTC+3:30 (IRST)

Behjatabad (Persian: بهجت اباد) (Note: Also romanized as Behjatābād) is a village in Kuhpayeh-e Sharqi Rural District of the Central District in Abyek County, Qazvin province, Iran.

== Demographics ==
=== Population ===
At the time of the 2006 National Census, the village's population was 426 in 117 households. The following census in 2011 counted 327 people in 110 households. The 2016 census measured the population of the village as 311 people in 110 households.
