= Eslamabad, Qazvin =

Village in Qazvin province, Iran

Eslamabad Persian: اسلام‌آباد
- Village
- Location within Iran
- Coordinates: 36°05′55″N 50°13′11″E
- Country: Iran
- Province: Qazvin
- County: Abyek
- District: Basharyat
- Rural District: Basharyat-e Gharbi

Population (2016)
  - Total: 539
- Time zone: UTC+3:30 (IRST)

Eslamabad (Persian: اسلام‌آباد) (Note: Also romanized as Eslāmābād) is a village in Basharyat-e Gharbi Rural District (Note: Formerly Basharyat Rural District) of Basharyat District in Abyek County, Qazvin province, Iran.

== Demographics ==
=== Population ===
At the time of the 2006 National Census, the village's population was 586 in 151 households. The following census in 2011 counted 570 people in 159 households. The 2016 census measured the population of the village as 539 people in 154 households.
