= Anjilaq =

Village in Qazvin province, Iran

Anjilaq Persian: انجيلاق
- Village
- Location within Iran
- Coordinates: 36°12′35″N 50°15′57″E
- Country: Iran
- Province: Qazvin
- County: Abyek
- District: Central
- Rural District: Kuhpayeh-e Gharbi

Population (2016)
  - Total: 319
- Time zone: UTC+3:30 (IRST)

Anjilaq (Persian: انجيلاق) (Note: Also romanized as Anjīlāq; also known as Anḩīlāq) is a village in Kuhpayeh-e Gharbi Rural District of the Central District in Abyek County, Qazvin province, Iran.

== Demographics ==
=== Population ===
At the time of the 2006 National Census, the village's population was 557 in 168 households. The following census in 2011 counted 517 people in 185 households. The 2016 census measured the population of the village as 319 people in 117 households.
