= Abyek-e Sofla =

Village in Qazvin province, Iran

Abyek-e Sofla Persian: آبیک سفلی
- Village
- Location within Iran
- Coordinates: 36°03′15″N 50°33′12″E
- Country: Iran
- Province: Qazvin
- County: Abyek
- District: Central
- Rural District: Ziaran

Population (2016)
  - Total: 105
- Time zone: UTC+3:30 (IRST)

Abyek-e Sofla (Persian: آبیک سفلی) (Note: Also romanized as Ābyek-e Soflā; also known as Abiak Pāīn, Ābyek-e Vasaţī, and Ābyek-e Pā’īn) is a village in Ziaran Rural District of the Central District in Abyek County, Qazvin province, Iran.

== Demographics ==
=== Population ===
At the time of the 2006 National Census, the village's population was 129 in 41 households. The following census in 2011 counted 102 people in 32 households. The 2016 census measured the population of the village as 105 people in 38 households.
