= Hezar Jolfa =

Village in Qazvin province, Iran

Hezar Jolfa Persian: هزارجلفا
- Village
- Location within Iran
- Coordinates: 36°07′58″N 50°13′34″E
- Country: Iran
- Province: Qazvin
- County: Abyek
- District: Basharyat
- Rural District: Basharyat-e Gharbi

Population (2016)
  - Total: 583
- Time zone: UTC+3:30 (IRST)

Hezar Jolfa (Persian: هزارجلفا) (Note: Also romanized as Hezār Jolfā) is a village in Basharyat-e Gharbi Rural District (Note: Formerly Basharyat Rural District) of Basharyat District in Abyek County, Qazvin province, Iran.

== Demographics ==
=== Population ===
At the time of the 2006 National Census, the village's population was 833 in 184 households. The following census in 2011 counted 795 people in 204 households. The 2016 census measured the population of the village as 583 people in 172 households.
