= Samghabad =

Village in Qazvin province, Iran

Samghabad Persian: صمغ‌آباد
- Village
- Location within Iran
- Coordinates: 36°07′01″N 50°36′42″E
- Country: Iran
- Province: Qazvin
- County: Abyek
- District: Central
- Rural District: Ziaran

Population (2016)
  - Total: 57
- Time zone: UTC+3:30 (IRST)

Samghabad (Persian: صمغ‌آباد) (Note: Also romanized as Şamghābād) is a village in Ziaran Rural District of the Central District in Abyek County, Qazvin province, Iran.

== Demographics ==
=== Population ===
At the time of the 2006 National Census, the village's population was 139 in 60 households. The following census in 2011 counted 73 people in 37 households. The 2016 census measured the population of the village as 57 people in 29 households.
