= Amadgah Abyek =

Village in Qazvin province, Iran

Amadgah Abyek Persian: آمادگاه آبیک
- Village
- Location within Iran
- Coordinates: 36°02′30″N 50°32′44″E
- Country: Iran
- Province: Qazvin
- County: Abyek
- District: Central
- Rural District: Ziaran

Population (2016)
  - Total: 1,684
- Time zone: UTC+3:30 (IRST)

Amadgah Abyek (Persian: آمادگاه آبیک) (Note: Also romanized as Āmādgāh Ābyeḵ) is a village in Ziaran Rural District of the Central District in Abyek County, Qazvin province, Iran.

== Demographics ==
=== Population ===
At the time of the 2006 National Census, the village's population was 2,105 in 549 households. The following census in 2011 counted 2,014 people in 557 households. The 2016 census measured the population of the village as 1,684 people in 427 households.
