= Miankuh, Qazvin =

Village in Qazvin province, Iran

Miankuh Persian: میان‌کوه
- Village
- Location within Iran
- Coordinates: 36°04′58″N 50°29′46″E
- Country: Iran
- Province: Qazvin
- County: Abyek
- District: Central
- Rural District: Ziaran

Population (2016)
  - Total: 131
- Time zone: UTC+3:30 (IRST)

Miankuh (Persian: میان‌کوه) (Note: Also romanized as Mīānkūh) is a village in Ziaran Rural District of the Central District in Abyek County, Qazvin province, Iran.

== Demographics ==
=== Population ===
At the time of the 2006 National Census, the village's population was 108 in 30 households. The following census in 2011 counted 115 people in 38 households. The 2016 census measured the population of the village as 131 people in 43 households.
