= Naserabad, Abyek =

Village in Qazvin province, Iran

Naserabad Persian: ناصراباد
- Village
- Location within Iran
- Coordinates: 36°07′29″N 50°21′33″E
- Country: Iran
- Province: Qazvin
- County: Abyek
- District: Central
- Rural District: Kuhpayeh-e Sharqi

Population (2016)
  - Total: 1,477
- Time zone: UTC+3:30 (IRST)

Naserabad (Persian: ناصراباد) (Note: Also romanized as Nāşerābād) is a village in, and the capital of, Kuhpayeh-e Sharqi Rural District in the Central District of Abyek County, Qazvin province, Iran.

== Demographics ==
=== Population ===
At the time of the 2006 National Census, the village's population was 1,945 in 501 households. The following census in 2011 counted 1,801 people in 521 households. The 2016 census measured the population of the village as 1,477 people in 472 households. It was the most populous village in its rural district.
