= Shekarnab =

Village in Qazvin province, Iran

Shekarnab Persian: شكرناب
- Village
- Location within Iran
- Coordinates: 36°15′40″N 50°21′51″E
- Country: Iran
- Province: Qazvin
- County: Abyek
- District: Central
- Rural District: Kuhpayeh-e Gharbi

Population (2016)
  - Total: 208
- Time zone: UTC+3:30 (IRST)

Shekarnab (Persian: شكرناب) (Note: Also romanized as Shakarnāb, Shekar Nāb, and Shekarnāb; also known as Shakarāb) is a village in Kuhpayeh-e Gharbi Rural District of the Central District in Abyek County, Qazvin province, Iran. The village contains the mausoleum of Emamzadeh Ali, built by Darvish Nureddin in 1479.

== Demographics ==
=== Population ===
At the time of the 2006 National Census, the village's population was 446 in 126 households. The following census in 2011 counted 38 people in 19 households. The 2016 census measured the population of the village as 208 people in 81 households.
