= Khatayan =

Khatayan (Persian: خطايان) may refer to:

- Khatayan, Qazvin
- Khatayan, Razavi Khorasan
