= Zarjeh Bostan =

Village in Qazvin province, Iran

Zarjeh Bostan Persian: زرجه بستان
- Village
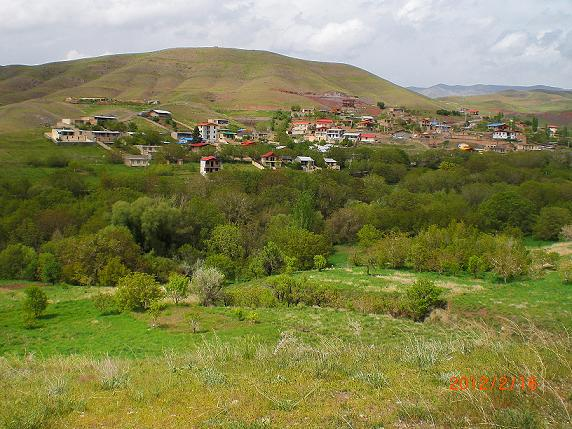
- The village of Zarjeh Bostan

- Location within Iran
- Coordinates: 36°16′09″N 50°19′52″E
- Country: Iran
- Province: Qazvin
- County: Abyek
- District: Central
- Rural District: Kuhpayeh-e Gharbi

Population (2016)
  - Total: 498
- Time zone: UTC+3:30 (IRST)

Zarjeh Bostan (Persian: زرجه بستان) (Note: Also romanized as Zarjeh Bostān) is a village in Kuhpayeh-e Gharbi Rural District of the Central District in Abyek County, Qazvin province, Iran.

== Demographics ==
=== Population ===
At the time of the 2006 National Census, the village's population was 276 in 122 households. The following census in 2011 counted 478 people in 159 households. The 2016 census measured the population of the village as 498 people in 176 households.
