= Tomb of Rais al-Mojahedin =

Mausoleum in Iran

- آرامگاه رئیس‌المجاهدین
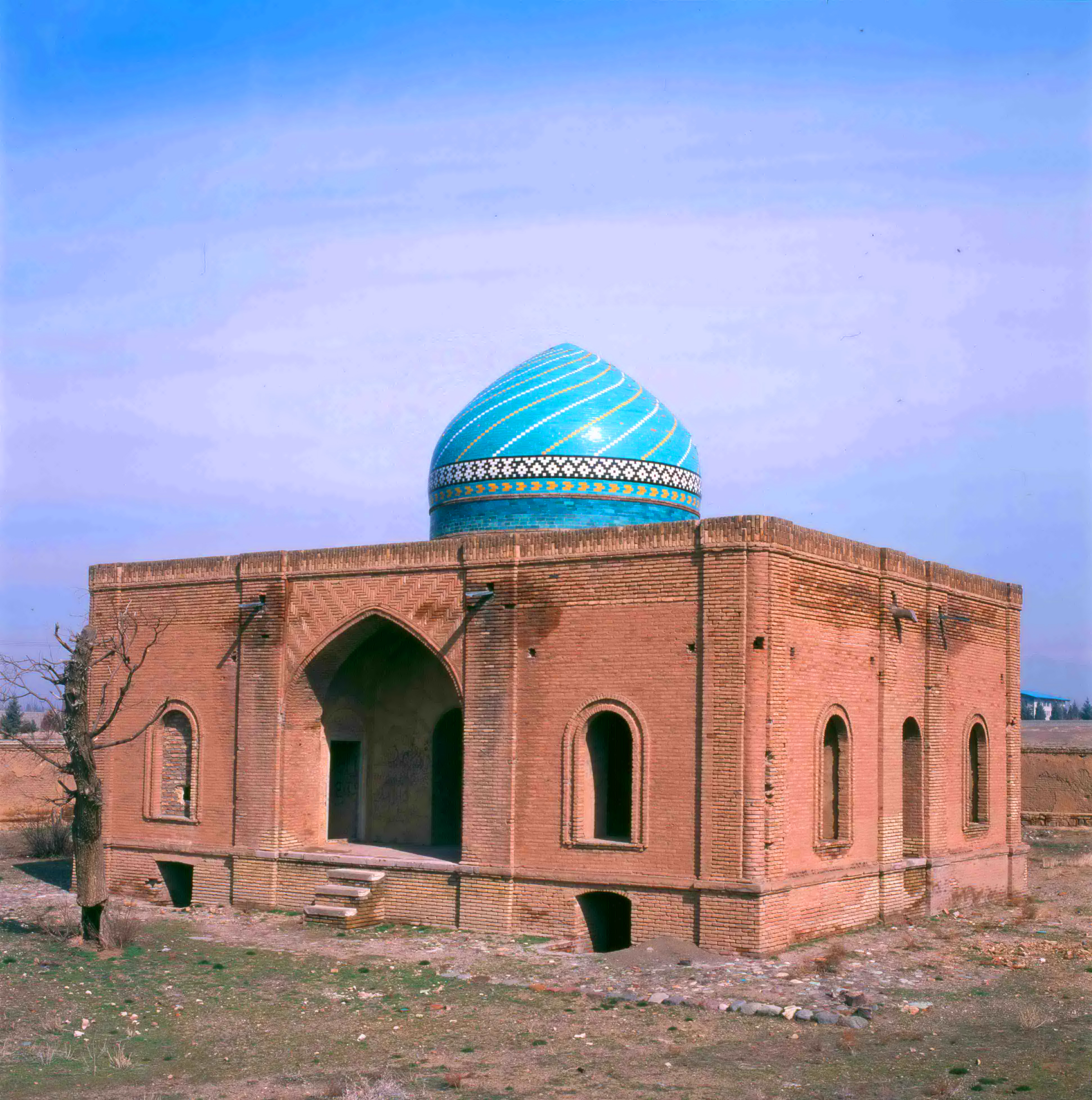
- Location: Yanesabad, Abyek, Qazvin Province
- Length: 15 meters
- Width: 12.6 meters
- Dedicated to: Rais al-Mojahedin

The Tomb of Rais al-Mojahedin (Persian: آرامگاه رئیس‌المجاهدین) is a late Qajar era mausoleum belonging to the Iranian revolutionary Rais al-Mojahedin.

The building was listed among the national heritage sites of Iran with the registration number 7683 on 8 March 2003.
