= Asgharabad, Qazvin =

Village in Qazvin province, Iran

Asgharabad Persian: اصغراباد
- Village
- Location within Iran
- Coordinates: 36°10′37″N 50°18′05″E
- Country: Iran
- Province: Qazvin
- County: Abyek
- District: Central
- Rural District: Kuhpayeh-e Sharqi

Population (2016)
  - Total: 176
- Time zone: UTC+3:30 (IRST)

Asgharabad (Persian: اصغراباد) (Note: Also romanized as Aşgharābād) is a village in Kuhpayeh-e Sharqi Rural District of the Central District in Abyek County, Qazvin province, Iran.

== Demographics ==
=== Population ===
At the time of the 2006 National Census, the village's population was 128 in 35 households. The following census in 2011 counted 199 people in 51 households. The 2016 census measured the population of the village as 176 people in 51 households.
