= Tazehabad, Qazvin =

Village in Qazvin province, Iran

Tazehabad Persian: تازه اباد
- Village
- Location within Iran
- Coordinates: 36°08′10″N 50°23′59″E
- Country: Iran
- Province: Qazvin
- County: Abyek
- District: Central
- Rural District: Kuhpayeh-e Sharqi

Population (2016)
  - Total: 298
- Time zone: UTC+3:30 (IRST)

Tazehabad (Persian: تازه اباد) (Note: Also romanized as Tāzehābād; also known as Seyyedābād) is a village in Kuhpayeh-e Sharqi Rural District of the Central District in Abyek County, Qazvin province, Iran.

== Demographics ==
=== Population ===
At the time of the 2006 National Census, the village's population was 420 in 113 households. The following census in 2011 counted 250 people in 76 households. The 2016 census measured the population of the village as 298 people in 104 households.
