= Zagheh, Qazvin =

Village in Qazvin province, Iran

Zagheh Persian: زاغه
- Village
- Location within Iran
- Coordinates: 36°06′19″N 50°19′45″E
- Country: Iran
- Province: Qazvin
- County: Abyek
- District: Basharyat
- Rural District: Basharyat-e Sharqi

Population (2016)
  - Total: 539
- Time zone: UTC+3:30 (IRST)

Zagheh (Persian: زاغه) (Note: Also romanized as Zāgheh) is a village in Basharyat-e Sharqi Rural District of Basharyat District in Abyek County, Qazvin province, Iran.

== Demographics ==
=== Population ===
At the time of the 2006 National Census, the village's population was 861 across 217 households. The following census in 2011 recorded 655 residents in 203 households. The 2016 census reported a population of 539 across 182 households.
