= Kundaj =

Village in Qazvin province, Iran

Kavandaj Persian: كوندج
- Village
- Location within Iran
- Coordinates: 36°11′18″N 50°14′58″E
- Country: Iran
- Province: Qazvin
- County: Abyek
- District: Central
- Rural District: Kuhpayeh-e Gharbi

Population (2016)
  - Total: 1,509
- Time zone: UTC+3:30 (IRST)

Kundaj (Persian: كوندج) (Note: Also romanized as Kavandaj and Kūndaj; also known as Kavandūj and Kondaj) is a village in, and the capital of, Kuhpayeh-e Gharbi Rural District in the Central District of Abyek County, Qazvin province, Iran.

== Demographics ==
=== Population ===
At the time of the 2006 National Census, the village's population was 1,801 in 419 households. The following census in 2011 counted 1,165 people in 321 households. The 2016 census measured the population of the village as 1,509 people in 470 households. It was the most populous village in its rural district.
