= Shahrestan, Qazvin =

Shahrestan شهرستان
- Village
- Location within Iran
- Coordinates: 36°01′26″N 50°08′11″E
- Country: Iran
- Province: Qazvin
- County: Abyek
- Bakhsh: Basharyat
- Rural District: Basharyat-e Gharbi

Population (2006)
  - Total: 446
- Time zone: UTC+3:30 (IRST)
  - Summer (DST): UTC+4:30 (IRDT)

Shahrestan (Persian: شهرستان, also Romanized as Shahrestān) is a village in Basharyat-e Gharbi Rural District, Basharyat District, Abyek County, Qazvin Province, Iran. At the 2006 census, its population was 446, in 114 families.
