= Murabad =

Village in Qazvin province, Iran

Murabad Persian: مورآباد
- Village
- Location within Iran
- Coordinates: 36°05′37″N 50°09′15″E
- Country: Iran
- Province: Qazvin
- County: Abyek
- District: Basharyat
- Rural District: Basharyat-e Gharbi

Population (2016)
  - Total: 607
- Time zone: UTC+3:30 (IRST)

Murabad (Persian: مورآباد) (Note: Also romanized as Mūrābād) is a village in Basharyat-e Gharbi Rural District (Note: Formerly Basharyat Rural District) of Basharyat District in Abyek County, Qazvin province, Iran.

== Demographics ==
=== Population ===
At the time of the 2006 National Census, the village's population was 615 in 146 households. The following census in 2011 counted 628 people in 185 households. The 2016 census measured the population of the village as 607 people in 191 households.
