= Chanasak =

Village in Qazvin province, Iran

Chanasak Persian: چناسك
- Village
- Location within Iran
- Coordinates: 36°16′17″N 50°21′51″E
- Country: Iran
- Province: Qazvin
- County: Abyek
- District: Central
- Rural District: Kuhpayeh-e Gharbi

Population (2016)
  - Total: 250
- Time zone: UTC+3:30 (IRST)

Chanasak (Persian: چناسك) (Note: Also romanized as Chanāsak and Chenāsk) is a village in Kuhpayeh-e Gharbi Rural District of the Central District in Abyek County, Qazvin province, Iran.

== Demographics ==
=== Population ===
According to the National Census, the village's population was 386 in 133 households (2006), 246 in 100 households (2011) and 250 in 106 households (2016).
