= Khakashan =

Village in Qazvin province, Iran

Khakashan Persian: خاكشان
- Village
- Location within Iran
- Coordinates: 36°03′50″N 50°15′03″E
- Country: Iran
- Province: Qazvin
- County: Abyek
- District: Basharyat
- Rural District: Basharyat-e Sharqi

Population (2016)
  - Total: 645
- Time zone: UTC+3:30 (IRST)

Khakashan (Persian: خاكشان) (Note: Also romanized as Khākashān) is a village in Basharyat-e Sharqi Rural District of Basharyat District in Abyek County, Qazvin province, Iran.

== Demographics ==
=== Population ===
At the time of the 2006 National Census, the village's population was 737 in 198 households. The following census in 2011 counted 705 people in 213 households. The 2016 census measured the population of the village as 645 people in 210 households.
