= Nowduz =

Village in Qazvin province, Iran

Nowduz Persian: نودوز
- Village
- Location within Iran
- Coordinates: 36°03′47″N 50°06′21″E
- Country: Iran
- Province: Qazvin
- County: Abyek
- District: Basharyat
- Rural District: Basharyat-e Gharbi

Population (2016)
  - Total: 829
- Time zone: UTC+3:30 (IRST)

Nowduz (Persian: نودوز) (Note: Also romanized as Nowdūz) is a village in Basharyat-e Gharbi Rural District (Note: Formerly Basharyat Rural District) of Basharyat District in Abyek County, Qazvin province, Iran.

== Demographics ==
=== Population ===
At the time of the 2006 National Census, the village's population was 959 in 209 households. The following census in 2011 counted 959 people in 275 households. The 2016 census measured the population of the village as 829 people in 251 households.
