= Khuznan =

Village in Qazvin province, Iran

Khuznan Persian: خوزنان
- Village
- Location within Iran
- Coordinates: 36°07′12″N 50°33′18″E
- Country: Iran
- Province: Qazvin
- County: Abyek
- District: Central
- Rural District: Ziaran

Population (2016)
  - Total: 199
- Time zone: UTC+3:30 (IRST)

Khuznan (Persian: خوزنان) (Note: Also romanized as Khūznān; also known as Khoznān) is a village in, and the capital of, Ziaran Rural District in the Central District of Abyek County, Qazvin province, Iran. The previous capital of the rural district was the village of Ziaran, now a city.

== Demographics ==
=== Population ===
At the time of the 2006 National Census, the village's population was 227 in 81 households. The following census in 2011 counted 180 people in 59 households. The 2016 census measured the population of the village as 199 people in 74 households.
