= Abdolabad, Abyek =

Village in Qazvin province, Iran

Abdolabad Persian: عبدل اباد
- Village
- Location within Iran
- Coordinates: 36°06′41″N 50°11′47″E
- Country: Iran
- Province: Qazvin
- County: Abyek
- District: Basharyat
- Rural District: Basharyat-e Gharbi

Population (2016)
  - Total: 1,369
- Time zone: UTC+3:30 (IRST)

Abdolabad (Persian: عبدل اباد) (Note: Also romanized as ‘Abdolābād) is a village in Basharyat-e Gharbi Rural District (Note: Formerly Basharyat Rural District) of Basharyat District in Abyek County, Qazvin province, Iran.

== Demographics ==
=== Population ===
At the time of the 2006 National Census, the village's population was 1,307 in 323 households. The following census in 2011 counted 1,386 people in 400 households. The 2016 census measured the population of the village as 1,369 people in 421 households. It was the most populous village in its rural district.
