= Shahrabad-e Kord =

Neighborhood in North Khorasan province, Iran

Shahrabad-e Kord Persian: شهراباد كرد
- Neighborhood
- Location within Iran
- Coordinates: 37°29′02″N 56°43′37″E
- Country: Iran
- Province: North Khorasan
- County: Samalqan
- District: Samalqan
- City: Ava

Population (2011)
  - Total: 2,274
- Time zone: UTC+3:30 (IRST)

Shahrabad-e Kord (Persian: شهراباد كرد) (Note: Also romanized as Shahrābād-e Kord) is a neighborhood in the city of Ava in Samalqan District of Samalqan County, (Note: Formerly Maneh and Samalqan County,) North Khorasan province, Iran.

== Demographics ==
=== Population ===
At the time of the 2006 National Census, Shahrabad-e Kord's population was 1,888 in 497 households, when it was a village in Qazi Rural District. (Note: Formerly Samalqan Rural District) The following census in 2011 counted 2,274 people in 667 households.

In 2013, Shahrabad-e Kord was merged with the nearby village of Shahrabad-e Khavar to form the new city of Ava.
