= Kalateh-ye Zaman Sufi =

Village in North Khorasan province, Iran

Kalateh-ye Zaman Sufi Persian: كلاته زمان صوفي
- Village
- Location within Iran
- Coordinates: 37°27′58″N 56°45′50″E
- Country: Iran
- Province: North Khorasan
- County: Samalqan
- District: Samalqan
- Rural District: Almeh

Population (2016)
  - Total: 775
- Time zone: UTC+3:30 (IRST)

Kalateh-ye Zaman Sufi (Persian: كلاته زمان صوفي) (Note: Also romanized as Kalāteh-ye Zamān Şūfī; also known as Zamān Şūfī) is a village in Almeh Rural District of Samalqan District in Samalqan County, (Note: Formerly Maneh and Samalqan County) North Khorasan province, Iran.

== Demographics ==
=== Population ===
At the time of the 2006 National Census, the village's population was 653 in 173 households. The following census in 2011 counted 757 people in 213 households. The 2016 census measured the population of the village as 775 people in 236 households.
