= Zard, North Khorasan =

Village in North Khorasan province, Iran

Zard Persian: زرد
- Village
- Location within Iran
- Coordinates: 37°30′18″N 56°33′05″E
- Country: Iran
- Province: North Khorasan
- County: Samalqan
- District: Samalqan
- Rural District: Qazi

Population (2016)
  - Total: 2,472
- Time zone: UTC+3:30 (IRST)

Zard (Persian: زرد) is a village in Qazi Rural District (Note: Formerly Samalqan Rural District) of Samalqan District in Samalqan County, (Note: Formerly Maneh and Samalqan County) North Khorasan province, Iran.

== Demographics ==
=== Population ===
At the time of the 2006 National Census, the village's population was 2,291 in 588 households. The following census in 2011 counted 2,363 people in 718 households. The 2016 census measured the population of the village as 2,472 people in 779 households, the most populous in its rural district.
