= Azadegan, North Khorasan =

Village in North Khorasan province, Iran

Azadegan Persian: آزادگان
- Village
- Location within Iran
- Coordinates: 37°28′22″N 56°48′38″E
- Country: Iran
- Province: North Khorasan
- County: Samalqan
- District: Samalqan
- Rural District: Almeh

Population (2016)
  - Total: 416
- Time zone: UTC+3:30 (IRST)

Azadegan (Persian: ازادگان) (Note: Also romanized as Azad Gan, Āzād Gān, and Āzādegān; also known as Ebrāhīm Shāh (ابراهيم شاه)) is a village in Almeh Rural District of Samalqan District in Samalqan County, (Note: Formerly Maneh and Samalqan County) North Khorasan province, Iran.

== Demographics ==
=== Population ===
At the time of the 2006 National Census, the village's population was 431 in 131 households. The following census in 2011 counted 515 people in 154 households. The 2016 census measured the population of the village as 416 people in 131 households.
