= Qaleh Khan, North Khorasan =

Village in North Khorasan province, Iran

Qaleh Khan Persian: قلعه خان
- Village
- Location within Iran
- Coordinates: 37°30′43″N 56°46′30″E
- Country: Iran
- Province: North Khorasan
- County: Samalqan
- District: Samalqan
- Rural District: Qazi

Population (2016)
  - Total: 1,538
- Time zone: UTC+3:30 (IRST)

Qaleh Khan (Persian: قلعه خان) (Note: Also romanized as Qal‘eh Khān; also known as Qal‘eh Now and Resālat (رسالت)) is a village in Qazi Rural District (Note: Formerly Samalqan Rural District) of Samalqan District in Samalqan County, (Note: Formerly Maneh and Samalqan County) North Khorasan province, Iran.

== Demographics ==
=== Population ===
At the time of the 2006 National Census, the village's population was 1,788 in 498 households. The following census in 2011 counted 1,703 people in 504 households. The 2016 census measured the population of the village as 1,538 people in 500 households.
