= Aspakhu =

Village in North Khorasan province, Iran

Aspakhu Persian: اسپاخو
- Village
- Location within Iran
- Coordinates: 37°24′20″N 56°22′12″E
- Country: Iran
- Province: North Khorasan
- County: Samalqan
- District: Samalqan
- Rural District: Almeh

Population (2016)
  - Total: 249
- Time zone: UTC+3:30 (IRST)

Aspakhu (Persian: اسپاخو) (Note: Also romanized as Aspākhū and Espākhū; also known as Asbākhū) is a village in Almeh Rural District of Samalqan District in Samalqan County, (Note: Formerly Maneh and Samalqan County) North Khorasan province, Iran. The Aspakhu Fire Temple is located in the village.

== Demographics ==
=== Population ===
At the time of the 2006 National Census, the village's population was 340 in 76 households. The following census in 2011 counted 292 people in 82 households. The 2016 census measured the population of the village as 249 people in 79 households.
