= Bash Kalateh =

Village in North Khorasan province, Iran

Bash Kalateh Persian: باش كلاته
- Village
- Location within Iran
- Coordinates: 37°24′53″N 56°29′32″E
- Country: Iran
- Province: North Khorasan
- County: Samalqan
- District: Samalqan
- Rural District: Almeh

Population (2016)
  - Total: 264
- Time zone: UTC+3:30 (IRST)

Bash Kalateh (Persian: باش كلاته) (Note: Also romanized as Bāsh Kalāteh) is a village in Almeh Rural District of Samalqan District in Samalqan County, (Note: Formerly Maneh and Samalqan County) North Khorasan province, Iran.

== Demographics ==
=== Population ===
At the time of the 2006 National Census, the village's population was 291 in 60 households. The following census in 2011 counted 204 people in 61 households. The 2016 census measured the population of the village as 264 people in 69 households.
