= Romani people in Iran =

کولی‌ها در ایران (Persian)

Total population
- 40,000

Languages
- Romani, Persian

Religion
- Islam, minority Christianity and Romani mythology

Romani people are a minority ethnic group in Iran. According to the Joshua Project, around 40,000 Romani live in Iran, with the majority following Islam. The Zargari people, a subgroup of Romani historically live in Zargar, Qazvin, Iran.

== History ==
Historians note that during the arrival of the Romani people to Europe from India, Romani people passed through Persia.

Firdusi, in his poem Shahnamah, documented that around the year 420, the Persian monarch Bahram V (reigning from 420 to 438) requested the Indian ruler to send twelve thousand Dom musicians to divert his subjects from the monotony of their everyday existence. These Doms—one of the various names by which this group was known at the time—were compensated for their musical performances with grain and land, enabling them to thrive. However, in this tale, the Doms were perceived as indolent; they consumed the grain but avoided cultivating the land. Consequently, the king had no choice but to banish them, condemning them to a life of perpetual wandering, relying on smuggling and begging for their sustenance. Romani people were later expelled from Persia after the death of Caliph al-Ma'mūn.

The Romani language, as spoken throughout Europe, incorporates Persian loanwords, and numerous European Roma possess Persian ancestry as a consequence of historical miscegenation between the Romani and Persians.

== Culture ==
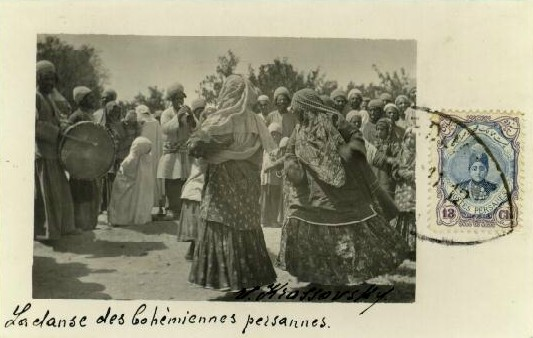
Persian Romani participating in a cultural dance

Romani populations demonstrate diverse lifestyles. Historically, some lived in small tent communities, while others lived alongside nomadic tribes. Romani people are traditionally connected to agricultural labor and music in Iran. The Zargari tribe of Zargar, Qazvin, Iran, speaks its own dialect of the Romani language, which is considered endangered.
