= Heydarabad, North Khorasan =

Village in North Khorasan province, Iran

Heydarabad Persian: حيدراباد
- Village
- Location within Iran
- Coordinates: 37°29′34″N 56°48′08″E
- Country: Iran
- Province: North Khorasan
- County: Samalqan
- District: Samalqan
- Rural District: Almeh

Population (2016)
  - Total: 453
- Time zone: UTC+3:30 (IRST)

Heydarabad (Persian: حيدراباد) (Note: Also romanized as Ḩeydarābād; also known as Haidarābād) is a village in Almeh Rural District of Samalqan District in Samalqan County, (Note: Formerly Maneh and Samalqan County) North Khorasan province, Iran.

== Demographics ==
=== Population ===
At the time of the 2006 National Census, the village's population was 516 in 147 households. The following census in 2011 counted 472 people in 132 households. The 2016 census measured the population of the village as 453 people in 147 households.
