= Amrudak, Qazvin =

Village in Qazvin province, Iran

Amrudak Persian: امرودك
- Village
- Location within Iran
- Coordinates: 36°18′58″N 50°26′17″E
- Country: Iran
- Province: Qazvin
- County: Abyek
- District: Central
- Rural District: Kuhpayeh-e Gharbi

Population (2016)
  - Total: 47
- Time zone: UTC+3:30 (IRST)

Amrudak (Persian: امرودك) (Note: Also romanized as Amrūdak) is a village in Kuhpayeh-e Gharbi Rural District of the Central District in Abyek County, Qazvin province, Iran.

== Demographics ==
=== Population ===
At the time of the 2006 National Census, the village's population was 139 in 58 households. The following census in 2011 counted a population below the reporting threshold. The 2016 census measured the population of the village as 47 people in 18 households.
