= Kalateh-ye Abbas Javini =

Village in North Khorasan province, Iran

Kalateh-ye Abbas Javini Persian: كلاته عباس جويني
- Village
- Location within Iran
- Country: Iran
- Province: North Khorasan
- County: Samalqan
- District: Samalqan
- Rural District: Qazi

Population (2016)
  - Total: 81
- Time zone: UTC+3:30 (IRST)

Kalateh-ye Abbas Javini (Persian: كلاته عباس جويني) (Note: Also romanized as Kalāteh-ye ʿAbbās Javīnī; also known as Kalāteh-ye Javīnī) is a village in Qazi Rural District (Note: Formerly Samalqan Rural District) of Samalqan District in Samalqan County, (Note: Formerly Maneh and Samalqan County) North Khorasan province, Iran.

== Demographics ==
=== Population ===
At the time of the 2006 National Census, the village's population was 89 in 27 households. The following census in 2011 counted 90 people in 24 households. The 2016 census measured the population of the village as 81 people in 24 households.
