= Langar, Samalqan =

Village in North Khorasan province, Iran

Langar Persian: لنگر
- Village
- Location within Iran
- Coordinates: 37°32′29″N 56°47′58″E
- Country: Iran
- Province: North Khorasan
- County: Samalqan
- District: Samalqan
- Rural District: Qazi

Population (2016)
  - Total: 875
- Time zone: UTC+3:30 (IRST)

Langar (Persian: لنگر) is a village in Qazi Rural District (Note: Formerly Samalqan Rural District) of Samalqan District in Samalqan County, (Note: Formerly Maneh and Samalqan County) North Khorasan province, Iran.

== Demographics ==
=== Population ===
At the time of the 2006 National Census, the village's population was 782 in 211 households. The following census in 2011 counted 1,016 people in 273 households. The 2016 census measured the population of the village as 875 people in 256 households.
