= Azizabad, North Khorasan =

Village in North Khorasan province, Iran

Azizabad Persian: عزيزاباد
- Village
- Location within Iran
- Coordinates: 37°32′55″N 56°48′50″E
- Country: Iran
- Province: North Khorasan
- County: Samalqan
- District: Samalqan
- Rural District: Qazi

Population (2016)
  - Total: 504
- Time zone: UTC+3:30 (IRST)

Azizabad (Persian: عزيزاباد) (Note: Also romanized as ‘Azīzābād) is a village in Qazi Rural District (Note: Formerly Samalqan Rural District) of Samalqan District in Samalqan County, (Note: Formerly Maneh and Samalqan County) North Khorasan province, Iran.

== Demographics ==
=== Population ===
At the time of the 2006 National Census, the village's population was 492 in 130 households. The following census in 2011 counted 581 people in 164 households. The 2016 census measured the population of the village as 504 people in 160 households.
