= Kastan =

Village in North Khorasan province, Iran

Kastan Persian: كاستان
- Village
- Location within Iran
- Coordinates: 37°28′57″N 56°24′02″E
- Country: Iran
- Province: North Khorasan
- County: Samalqan
- District: Samalqan
- Rural District: Qazi

Population (2016)
  - Total: 803
- Time zone: UTC+3:30 (IRST)

Kastan (Persian: كاستان) (Note: Also romanized as Kāstān) is a village in Qazi Rural District (Note: Formerly Samalqan Rural District) of Samalqan District in Samalqan County, (Note: Formerly Maneh and Samalqan County) North Khorasan province, Iran.

== Demographics ==
=== Population ===
At the time of the 2006 National Census, the village's population was 790 in 205 households. The following census in 2011 counted 778 people in 215 households. The 2016 census measured the population of the village as 803 people in 232 households.
