= Khatayan, Qazvin =

Village in Qazvin province, Iran

Khatayan Persian: خطايان
- Village
- Location within Iran
- Coordinates: 36°05′20″N 50°15′50″E
- Country: Iran
- Province: Qazvin
- County: Abyek
- District: Basharyat
- Rural District: Basharyat-e Sharqi

Population (2016)
  - Total: 802
- Time zone: UTC+3:30 (IRST)

Khatayan (Persian: خطايان) (Note: Also romanized as Khaţāyān) is a village in, and the capital of, Basharyat-e Sharqi Rural District in Basharyat District of Abyek County, Qazvin province, Iran.

== Demographics ==
=== Population ===
At the time of the 2006 National Census, the village's population was 901 in 240 households. The following census in 2011 counted 884 people in 272 households. The 2016 census measured the population of the village as 802 people in 270 households. It was the most populous village in its rural district.
