= Kalateh-ye Ghamu =

Village in North Khorasan province, Iran

Kalateh-ye Ghamu Persian: كلاته غمو
- Village
- Location within Iran
- Coordinates: 37°28′59″N 56°40′11″E
- Country: Iran
- Province: North Khorasan
- County: Samalqan
- District: Samalqan
- Rural District: Qazi

Population (2016)
  - Total: 643
- Time zone: UTC+3:30 (IRST)

Kalateh-ye Ghamu (Persian: كلاته غمو) (Note: Also romanized as Kalāteh-ye Ghamū; also known as Kalāteh Chanbar, Kalāteh-ye Ghanbar, and Kalāteh-ye Qamū) is a village in Qazi Rural District (Note: Formerly Samalqan Rural District) of Samalqan District in Samalqan County, (Note: Formerly Maneh and Samalqan County) North Khorasan province, Iran.

== Demographics ==
=== Population ===
At the time of the 2006 National Census, the village's population was 610 in 155 households. The following census in 2011 counted 646 people in 194 households. The 2016 census measured the population of the village as 643 people in 203 households.
