= Juza =

Juza may refer to:

- Juza, Iran, a village in North Khorasan Province, Iran
- 48171 Juza, an asteroid

== People with the surname ==
- Martin Jůza (born 1987), Czech Magic: The Gathering player
