= Kalateh-ye Tashi =

Village in North Khorasan province, Iran

Kalateh-ye Tashi Persian: كلاته تشي
- Village
- Location within Iran
- Coordinates: 37°29′08″N 56°37′38″E
- Country: Iran
- Province: North Khorasan
- County: Samalqan
- District: Samalqan
- Rural District: Qazi

Population (2016)
  - Total: 249
- Time zone: UTC+3:30 (IRST)

Kalateh-ye Tashi (Persian: كلاته تشي) (Note: Also romanized as Kalāteh-ye Tashī; also known as Moḩammadābād) is a village in Qazi Rural District (Note: Formerly Samalqan Rural District) of Samalqan District in Samalqan County, (Note: Formerly Maneh and Samalqan County) North Khorasan province, Iran.

== Demographics ==
=== Population ===
At the time of the 2006 National Census, the village's population was 264 in 64 households. The following census in 2011 counted 274 people in 82 households. The 2016 census measured the population of the village as 249 people in 72 households.
