= Shahrabad-e Khavar =

Neighborhood in North Khorasan province, Iran

Shahrabad-e Khavar Persian: شهراباد خاور
- Neighborhood
- Location within Iran
- Coordinates: 37°28′31″N 56°44′27″E
- Country: Iran
- Province: North Khorasan
- County: Samalqan
- District: Samalqan
- City: Ava

Population (2011)
  - Total: 1,784
- Time zone: UTC+3:30 (IRST)

Shahrabad-e Khavar (Persian: شهراباد خاور) (Note: Also romanized as Shahrābād-e Khāvar; also known as Shāhābād-e Khāvar) is a neighborhood in the city of Ava in Samalqan District of Samalqan County, (Note: Formerly Maneh and Samalqan County,) North Khorasan province, Iran.

== Demographics ==
=== Population ===
At the time of the 2006 National Census, Shahrabad-e Khavar's population was 1,727 in 430 households, when it was a village in Qazi Rural District. (Note: Formerly Samalqan Rural District) The following census in 2011 counted 1,784 people in 520 households.

In 2013, Shahrabad-e Khavar was merged with the nearby village of Shahrabad-e Kord to form the new city of Ava.
