= Bahramabad, Qazvin (disambiguation) =

Bahramabad (Persian: بهرام اباد) in Qazvin Province may refer to:

- Bahramabad, Abyek, a village in Abyek County, Qazvin Province, Iran
- Bahramabad, Qazvin, a village in Qazvin County, Qazvin Province, Iran
- Bahramabad-e Qaqazan, a village in Qazvin County, Qazvin Province, Iran
