= Amrudak =

Amrudak (Persian: امرودك) may refer to:

- Amrudak, Qazvin
- Amrudak, Razavi Khorasan
