= Kia Deh =

Kia Deh or Kiadeh or Keya Deh or Kiya Deh (Persian: كياده) may refer to:

- Kiadeh, Mazandaran
- Kia Deh, Qazvin
