= Zargari Romani =

Balkan Romani dialect

Zargari
- Native to: Iran
- Language family: Indo-European: Indo-Iranian; Indo-Aryan; Romani; Balkan Romani; Zargari

Language codes
- ISO 639-3: –
- Glottolog: zarg1238

Zargari (or Romāno) is a dialect of Balkan Romani, spoken in Zargar region (Abyek district) of the Qazvin Province of in Iran by the ethnic Zargari people. The language can be found in surrounding regions as well. It is one of the only Indo-Aryan languages still spoken in Iran, and is considered endangered. Zargari takes its name from the Persian word for "goldsmith" (زرگر zargar).

== Vocabulary ==
- Eighteen = Oxdu
- For me = Miri
- For you = Diri
- Fish = Mačo
- God = Del
- Horse = Grast
- Fox = Jӕqqӕlis
- Hand = Vast
- Water = Pani
- Night = Rati
- Donkey = Xer
- Bread = Manro

== See also ==
- Domari language
- Romani language
