= Qeshlaq, Qazvin =

City in Qazvin province, Iran

Qeshlaq Persian: قشلاق
- City
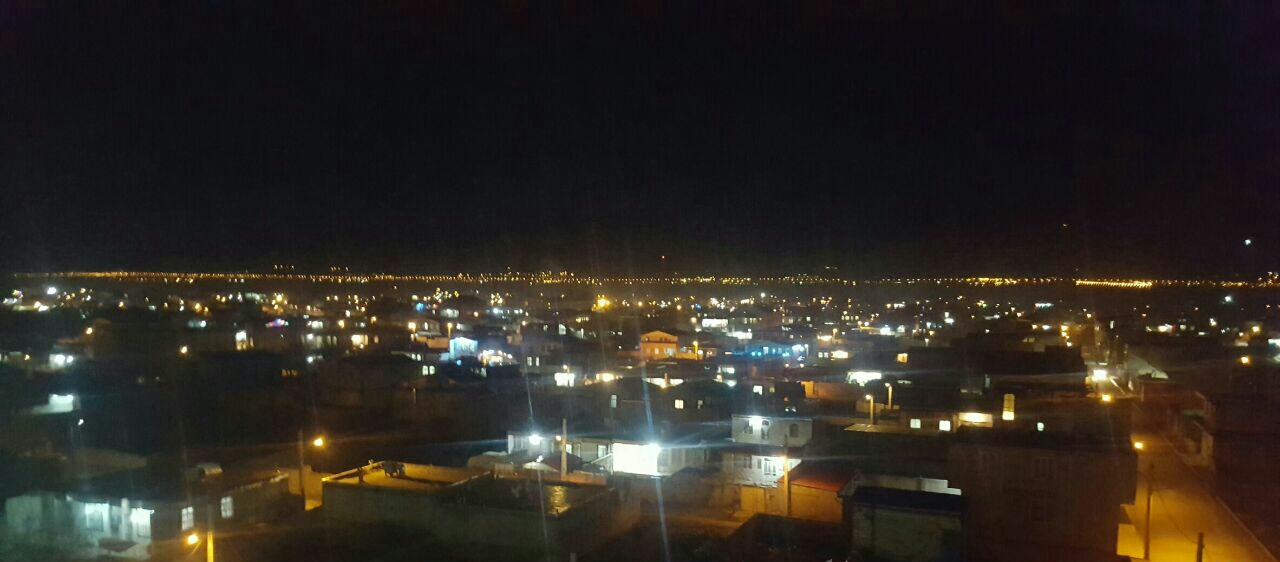
- The city of Qeshlaq at night

- Location within Iran
- Coordinates: 36°00′45″N 50°25′26″E
- Country: Iran
- Province: Qazvin
- County: Abyek
- District: Central
- Established as a city: 2020

Population (2016)
  - Total: 3,798
- Time zone: UTC+3:30 (IRST)

Qeshlaq (Persian: قشلاق) (Note: Also romanized as Qeshlāq) is a city in the Central District of Abyek County, Qazvin province, Iran.

== Demographics ==
=== Population ===
At the time of the 2006 National Census, Qeshlaq's population was 4,315 in 1,146 households, when it was a village in Ziaran Rural District. The following census in 2011 counted 4,138 people in 1,257 households. The 2016 census measured the population of the village as 3,798 people in 1,215 households. It was the most populous village in its rural district.

Qeshlaq was converted to a city in 2020.
