= Aspakhu Fire Temple =

Fire temple in Iran

Coordinates: 37.4030°N 56.3698°E

Aspakhu fire temple
- آتشکده اسپاخو
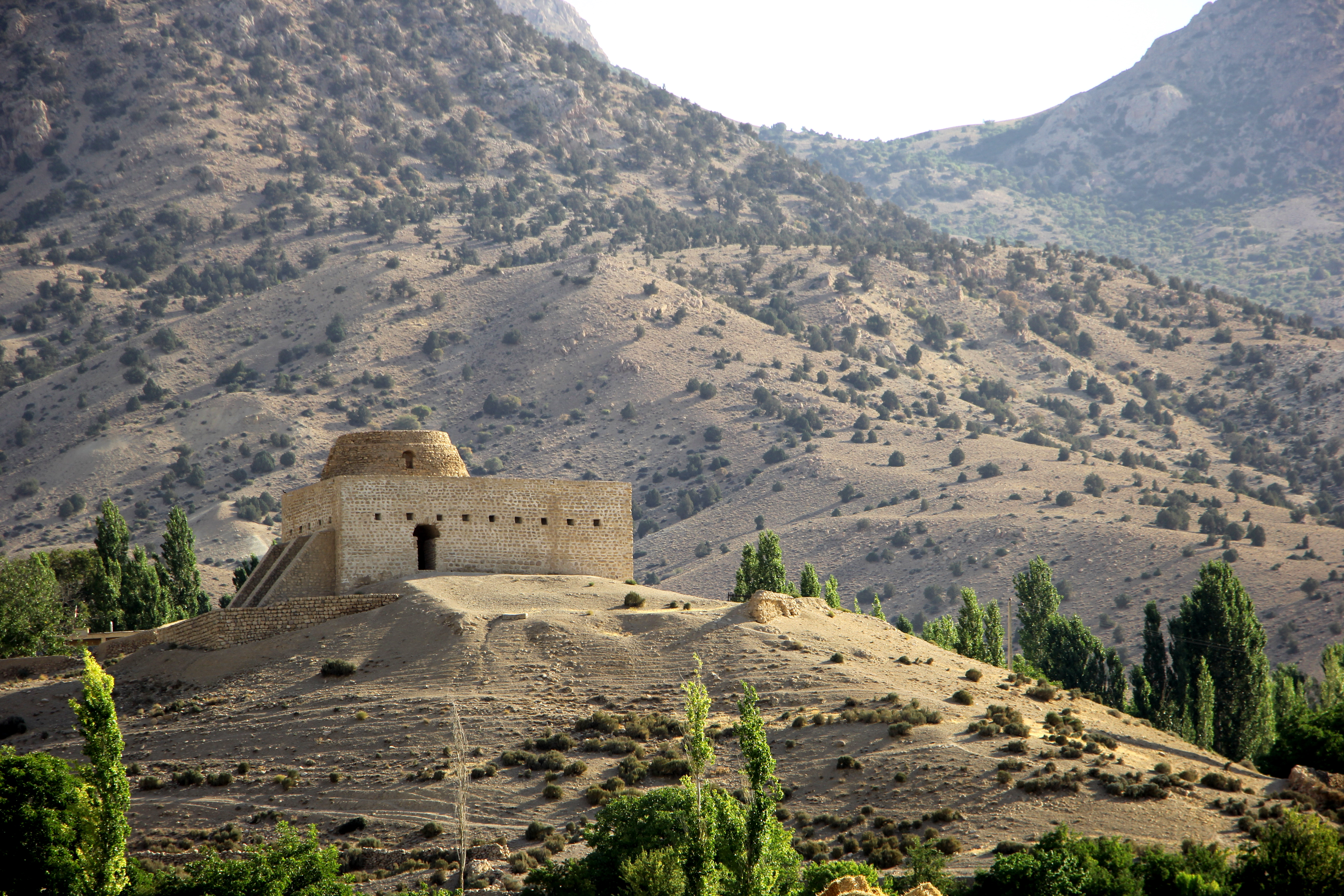

Religion
- Affiliation: Zoroastrianism

Location
- Location: Aspakhu, North Khorasan province, Iran
- Country: Iran
- Interactive map of Aspakhu fire temple

Architecture
- Style: Sasanian architecture
- Materials: Stone

The Aspakhu Fire Temple (Persian: آتشکده اسپاخو) is a Sasanian fire temple located in Aspakhu, Iran.

It was listed as an Iranian national heritage site with the registration number 1579 on 23 January 1978.

== Gallery ==
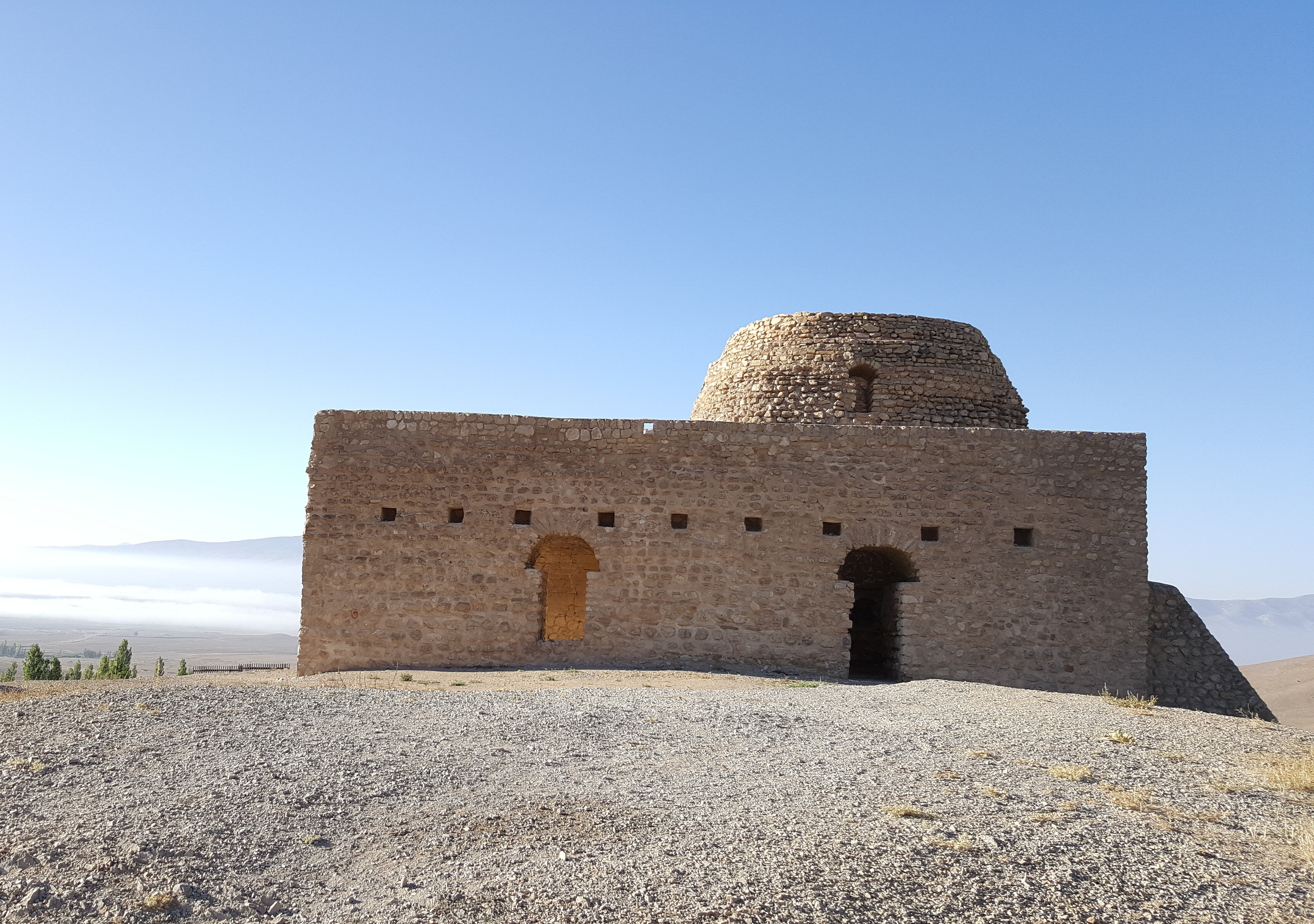

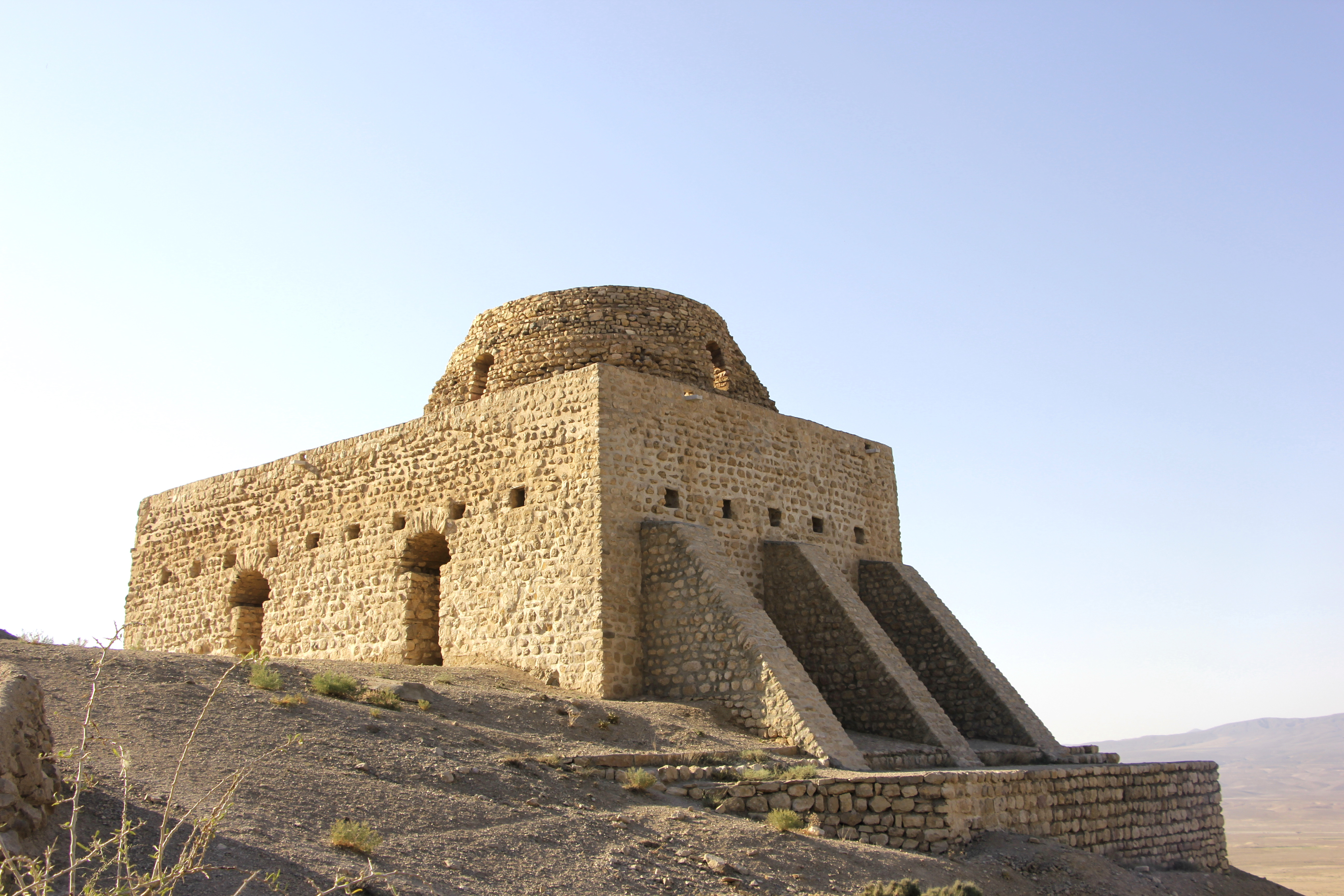

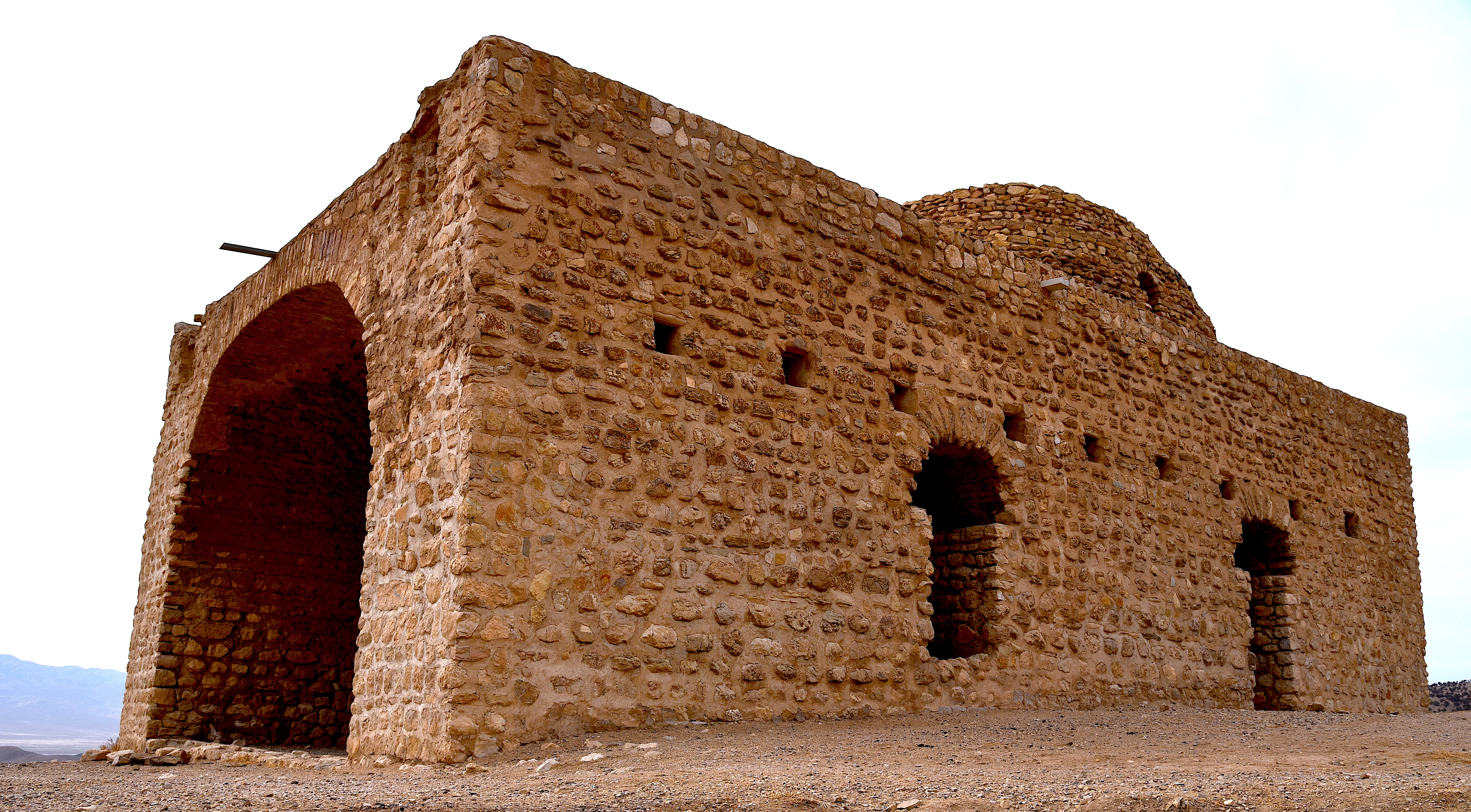

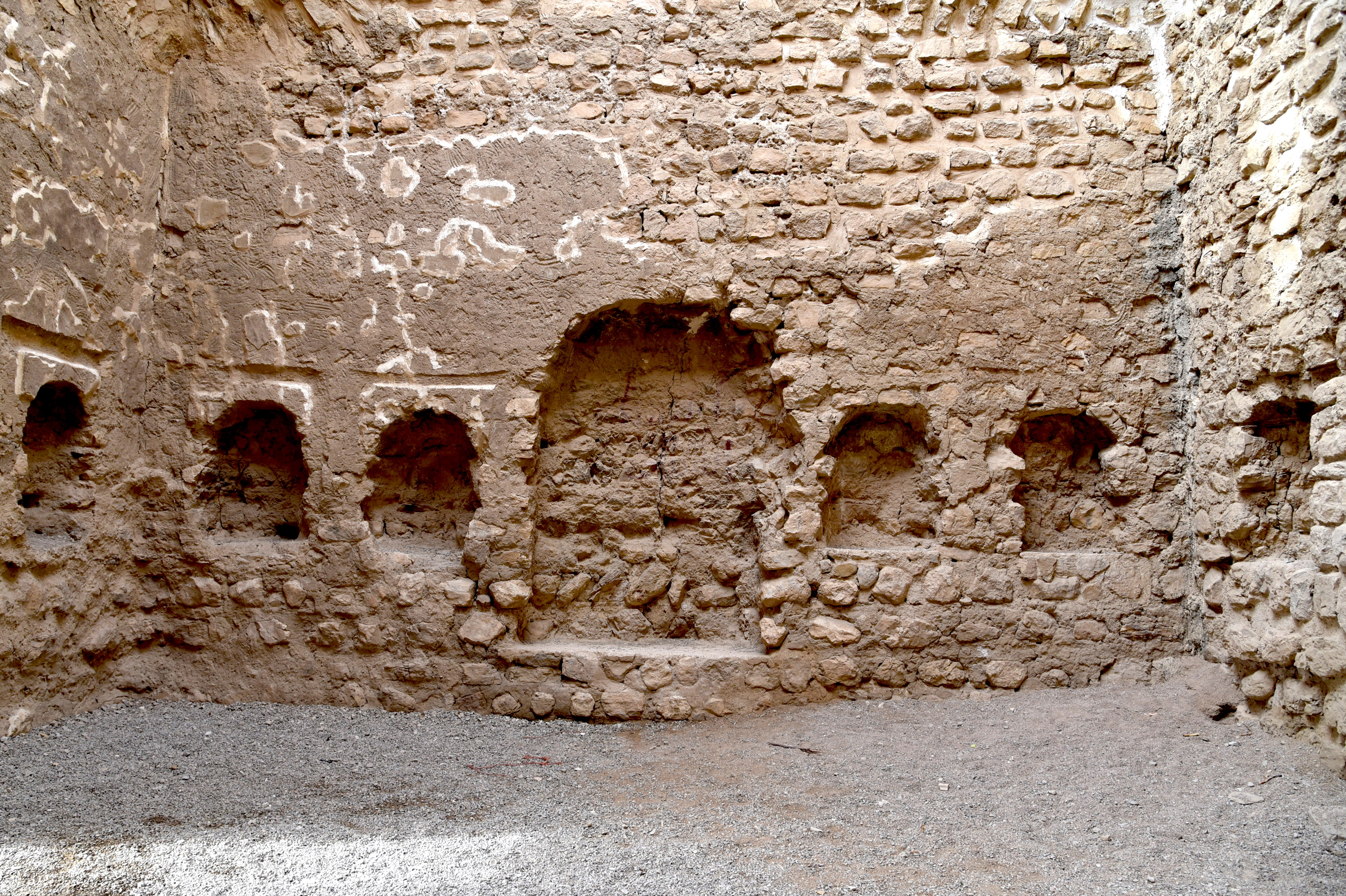

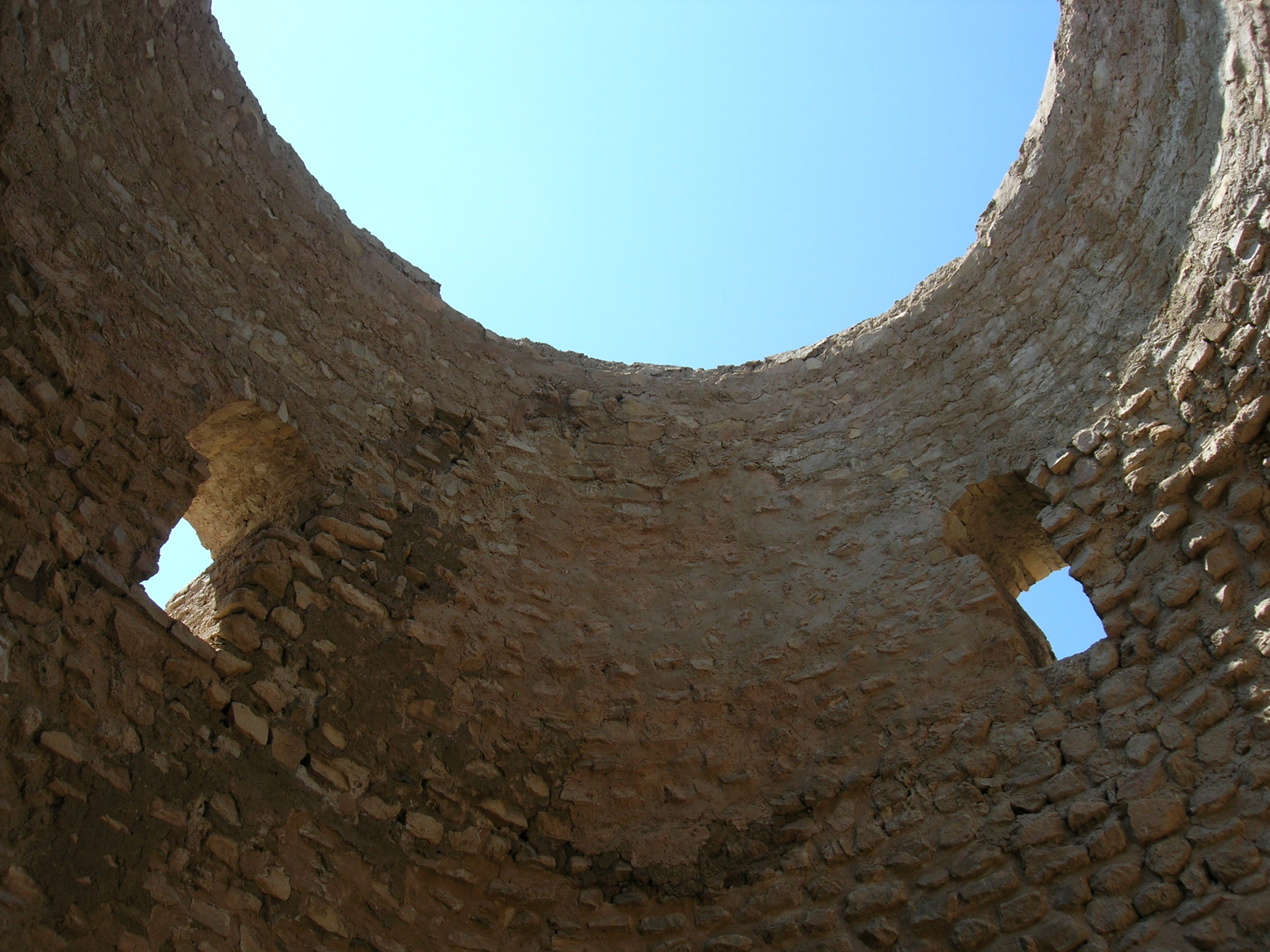

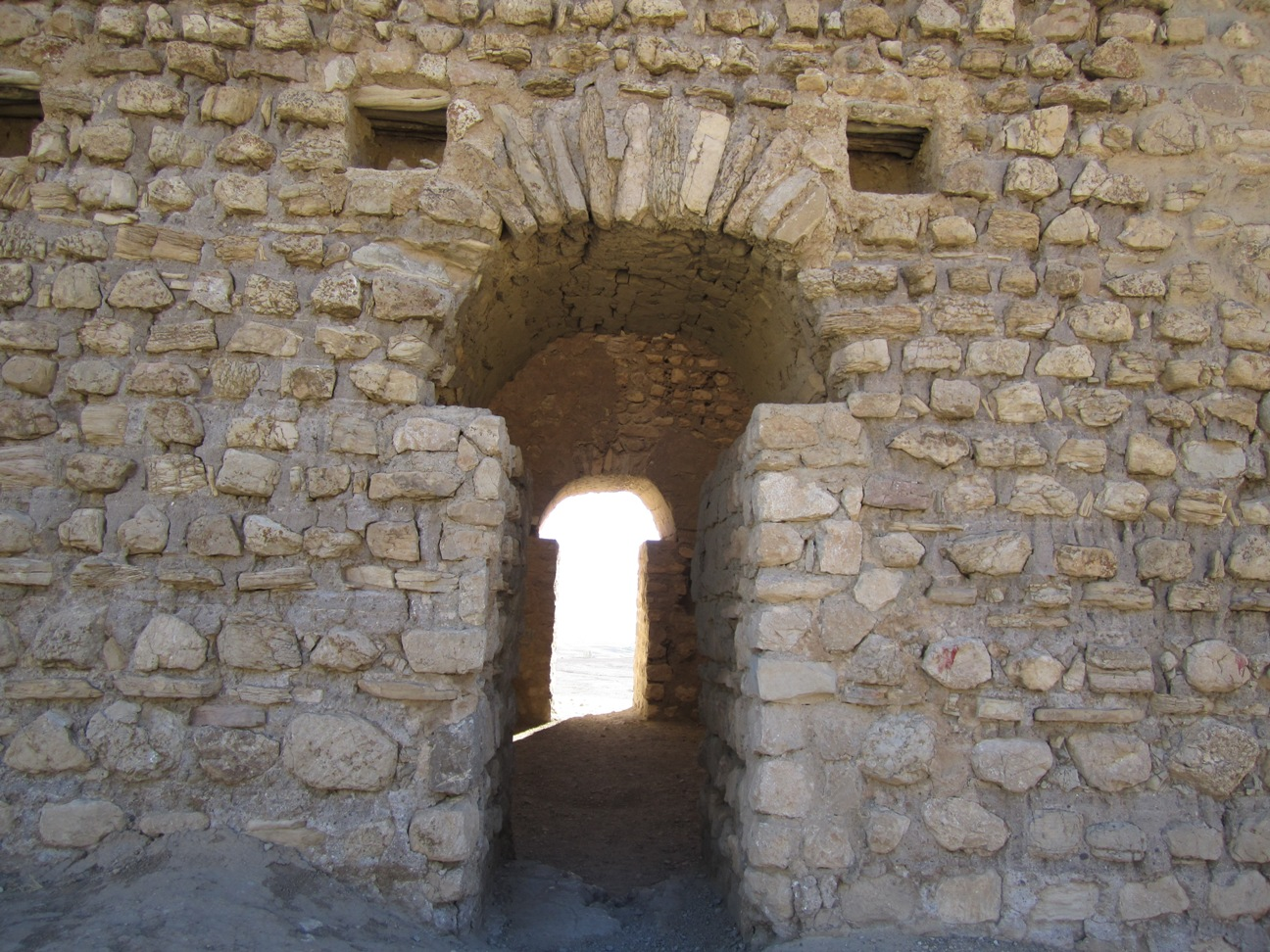

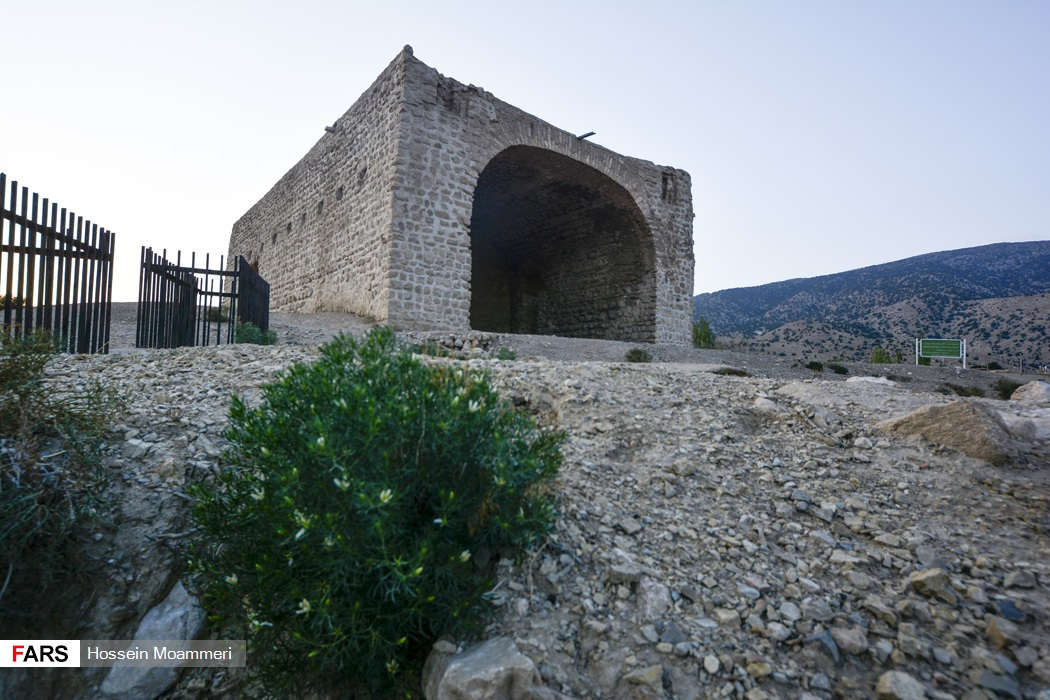

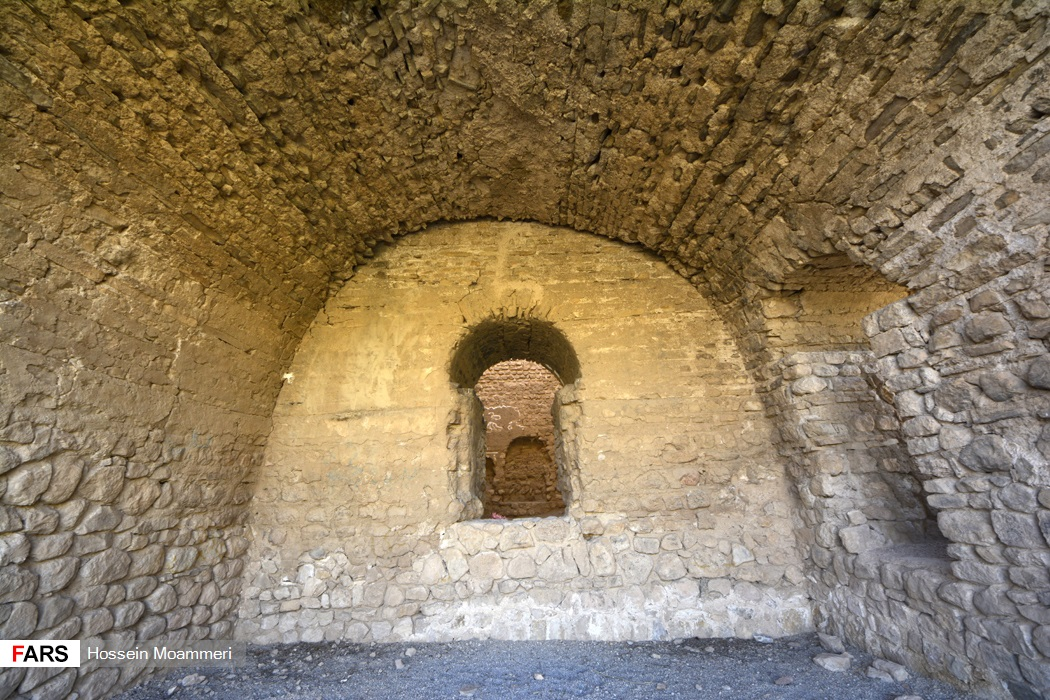
