= Kashanak, North Khorasan =

Village in North Khorasan province, Iran

Kashanak Persian: كشانك
- Village
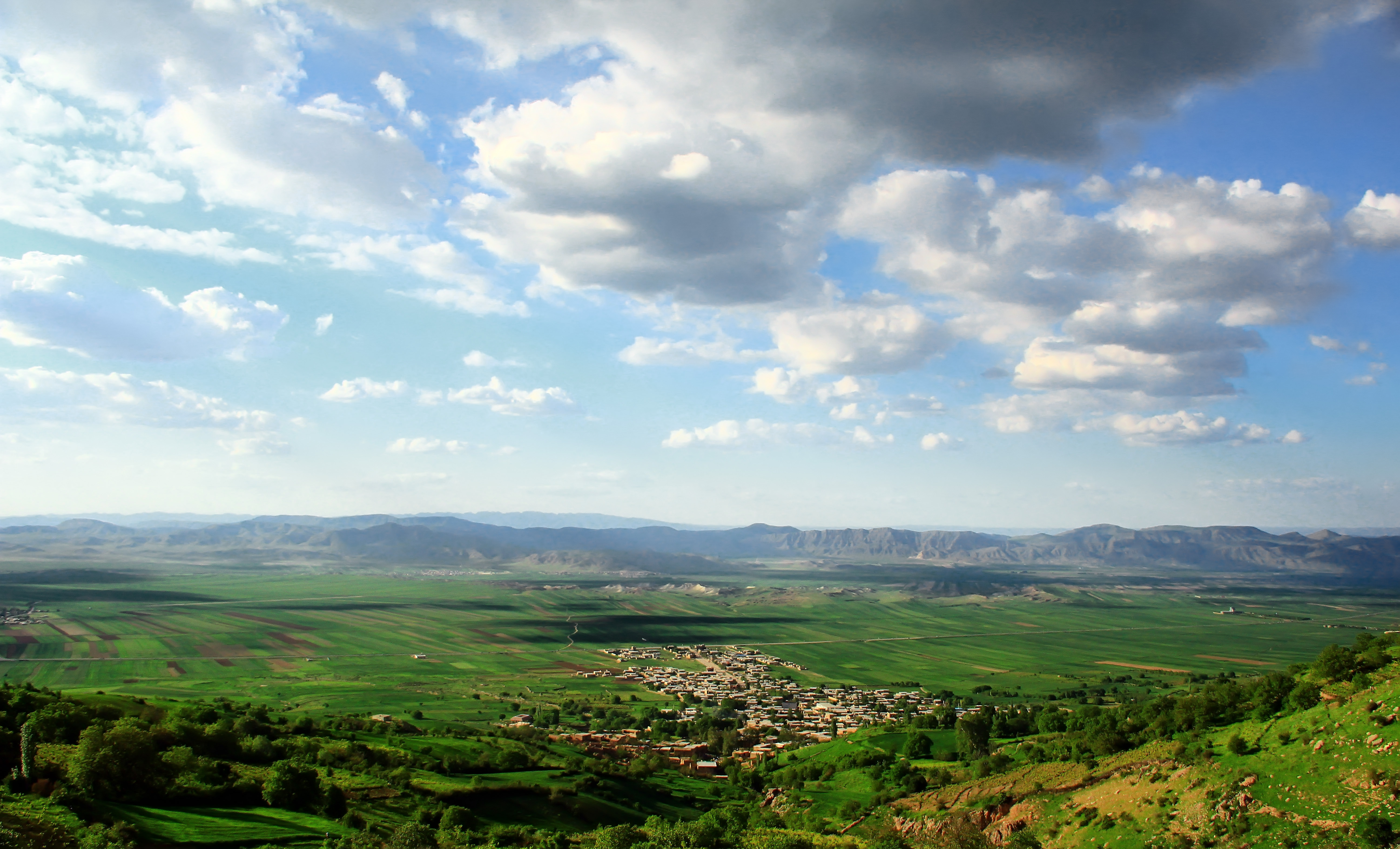
- The village of Kashanak

- Location within Iran
- Coordinates: 37°28′42″N 56°49′44″E
- Country: Iran
- Province: North Khorasan
- County: Samalqan
- District: Samalqan
- Rural District: Almeh

Population (2016)
  - Total: 2,807
- Time zone: UTC+3:30 (IRST)

Kashanak (Persian: كشانك) (Note: Also romanized as Kashānak and Keshānak; also known as Golzār) is a village in, and the capital of, Almeh Rural District in Samalqan District of Samalqan County, (Note: Formerly Maneh and Samalqan County) North Khorasan province, Iran.

== Demographics ==
=== Population ===
At the time of the 2006 National Census, the village's population was 2,574 in 712 households. The following census in 2011 counted 2,851 people in 856 households. The 2016 census measured the population of the village as 2,807 people in 886 households, the most populous in its rural district.
