= Ava, North Khorasan =

City in North Khorasan province, Iran

Ava Persian: آوا
- City
- Location within Iran
- Coordinates: 37°28′53″N 56°44′01″E
- Country: Iran
- Province: North Khorasan
- County: Samalqan
- District: Samalqan
- Established: 2013

Population (2016)
  - Total: 3,993
- Time zone: UTC+3:30 (IRST)

Ava (Persian: آوا) is a city in Samalqan District of Samalqan County, (Note: Formerly Maneh and Samalqan County) North Khorasan province, Iran. The city was formed in 2013 from the merger of the villages of Shahrabad-e Khavar and Shahrabad-e Kord.

== Demographics ==
=== Population ===
The 2016 National Census measured the population of the city as 3,993 people in 1,268 households.
