= Zargari tribe =

Romani group in Iran

Zargar
Regions with significant populations
- Zargar, Qazvin, Iran

Languages
- Zargari Romani; Persian; Azerbaijani

Religion
- Shia Islam

Related ethnic groups
- Muslim Romani people

The Zargari are a Muslim Romani subgroup that live in Zargar, in northwestern Iran. They speak Zargari Romani, a distinct dialect of Balkan Romani most closely related to dialects historically spoken in Rumelia. Their presence in Iran stems from eastward migration of Romani people from Southeastern Europe during the Ottoman period.

== Origin and history ==
Historical documentation of Zargari origins is lacking, but one seemingly accurate tradition traces their origins to three goldsmith brothers, (Persian: زرگر, zargar), who migrated from the Ottoman region of Rumelia to Maritsa Valley, in present-day south Bulgaria, and subsequently to Ottoman Damascus, from where they were brought to Shiraz as hostages during the reign of Nader Shah (1736–1747) and given pasture lands as a reward for their skills.

== See also ==
- Romani people in Iran
- Persian Romani
- Indians in Iran

== Bibliography ==
- Baghbidi, Hassan Rezai. "The Zargari language: An endangered European Romani in Iran", Romani Studies, vol. 13, pp. 123–148 (2003).Wayback Machine
- Marushiakova, Elena and Vesselin Popov. 2010. "Migrations West to East in the Times of the Ottoman Empire: The Example of a Gypsy/Roma Group in Modern Iran" Anthropology of the Middle East 5 (1): 93–99.
- McDowell, Bart. "Gypsies: Wanderers of the World" (Washington, DC: National Geographic Society, 1970), pp. 163–166.
- Windfuhr, Gernot. "European Gypsy in Iran: A First Report" Anthropological Linguistics 12.8 (1970): 271–292.
