= Qazi, Samalqan =

City in North Khorasan province, Iran

Qazi Persian: قاضي
- City
- Location within Iran
- Coordinates: 37°29′39″N 56°44′56″E
- Country: Iran
- Province: North Khorasan
- County: Samalqan
- District: Samalqan

Population (2016)
  - Total: 2,428
- Time zone: UTC+3:30 (IRST)

Qazi (Persian: قاضي) (Note: Also known as Gazī and Ghāẕī) is a city in, and the capital of, Samalqan District in Samalqan County, (Note: Formerly Maneh and Samalqan County) North Khorasan province, Iran. It also serves as the administrative center for Qazi Rural District. (Note: Formerly Samalqan Rural District)

== Demographics ==
=== Population ===
At the time of the 2006 National Census, the city's population was 2,370 in 674 households. The following census in 2011 counted 2,956 people in 792 households. The 2016 census measured the population of the city as 2,428 people in 817 households.
