= Almeh Rural District =

Rural district in North Khorasan province, Iran

Almeh Rural District Persian: دهستان آلمه
- Rural District
- Location within Iran
- Coordinates: 37°25′N 56°29′E
- Country: Iran
- Province: North Khorasan
- County: Samalqan
- District: Samalqan
- Established: 2001
- Capital: Kashanak

Population (2016)
  - Total: 7,788
- Time zone: UTC+3:30 (IRST)

Almeh Rural District (Persian: دهستان آلمه) is in Samalqan District of Samalqan County, (Note: Formerly Maneh and Samalqan County) North Khorasan province, Iran. Its capital is the village of Kashanak.

== Demographics ==
=== Population ===
At the time of the 2006 National Census, the rural district's population was 7,517 in 1,980 households. There were 7,866 inhabitants in 2,309 households at the following census of 2011. The 2016 census measured the population of the rural district as 7,788 in 2,424 households. The most populous of its 22 villages was Kashanak, with 2,807 people.

=== Other villages in the rural district ===
- Aspakhu
- Azadegan
- Bash Kalateh
- Chaman Bid
- Darkesh
- Havar
- Heydarabad
- Jowzak
- Kalateh-ye Zaman Sufi
