= Yanesabad =

Village in Qazvin province, Iran

Yanesabad Persian: يانس اباد
- Village
- Location within Iran
- Coordinates: 36°11′44″N 50°20′05″E
- Country: Iran
- Province: Qazvin
- County: Abyek
- District: Central
- Rural District: Kuhpayeh-e Sharqi

Population (2016)
  - Total: 52
- Time zone: UTC+3:30 (IRST)

Yanesabad (Persian: يانس اباد) (Note: Also romanized as Yānesābād; also known as Yūnesābād) is a village in Kuhpayeh-e Sharqi Rural District of the Central District in Abyek County, Qazvin province, Iran.

== Demographics ==
=== Population ===
At the time of the 2006 National Census, the village's population was 257 in 78 households. The following census in 2011 counted 163 people in 49 households. The 2016 census measured the population of the village as 52 people in 19 households.
