= Ziaran =

City in Qazvin province, Iran

Ziaran Persian: زياران
- City
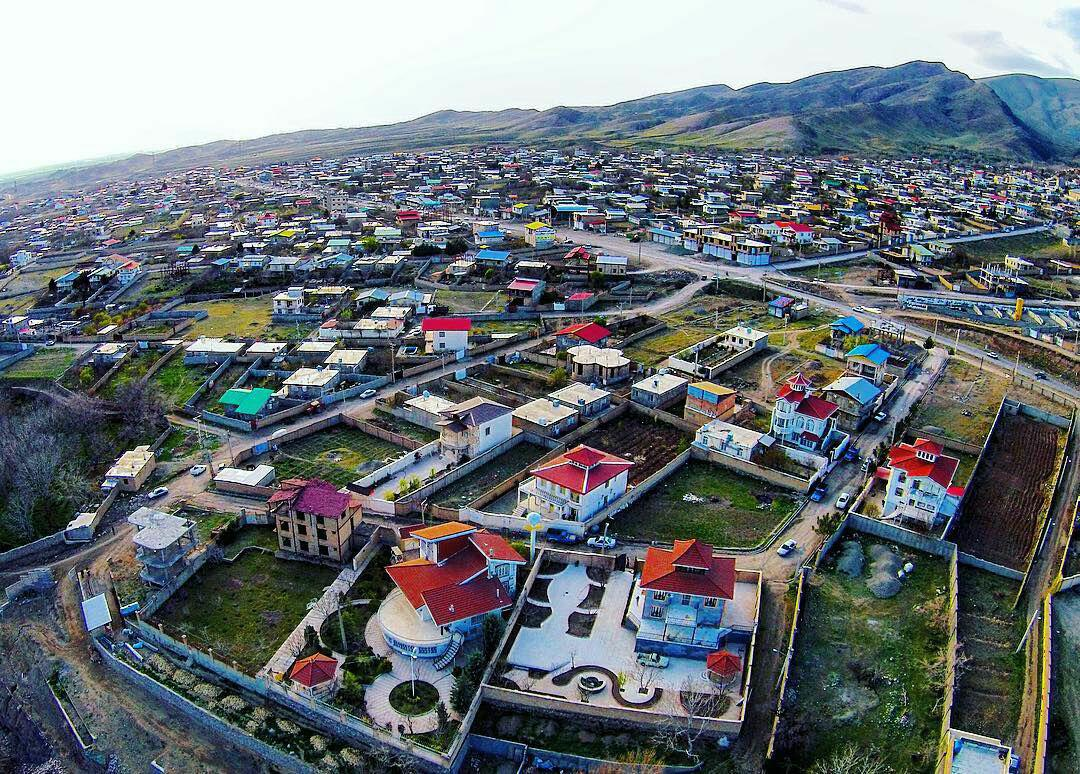
- The city of Ziaran

- Location within Iran
- Coordinates: 36°07′16″N 50°31′44″E
- Country: Iran
- Province: Qazvin
- County: Abyek
- District: Central
- Established as a city: 2020

Population (2016)
  - Total: 3,749
- Time zone: UTC+3:30 (IRST)

Ziaran (Persian: زياران) (Note: Also romanized as Zīārān) is a city in the Central District of Abyek County, Qazvin province, Iran. As a village, it was the capital of Ziaran Rural District until its capital was transferred to the village of Khuznan.

== Demographics ==
=== Language ===
People of Ziaran speak an Iranian language named Tati.

=== Population ===
At the time of the 2006 National Census, Ziaran's population was 4,287 in 1,168 households, when it was a village in Ziaran Rural District. The following census in 2011 counted 4,279 people in 1,299 households. The 2016 census measured the population of the village as 3,749 people in 1,251 households.

Ziaran was converted to a city in 2020.
