= Khak-e Ali =

City in Qazvin province, Iran

Khak-e Ali Persian: خاکعلی
- City
- Location within Iran
- Coordinates: 36°07′44″N 50°10′38″E
- Country: Iran
- Province: Qazvin
- County: Abyek
- District: Basharyat
- Established as a city: 2004

Population (2016)
  - Total: 3,148
- Time zone: UTC+3:30 (IRST)

Khak-e Ali (Persian: خاکعلی) (Note: Also romanized as Khak ‘Alī, Khāk-e ‘Alī, and Khāk-i- ‘Ali; formerly Khāqlīn) is a city in, and the capital of, Basharyat District in Abyek County, Qazvin province, Iran. It also serves as the administrative center for Basharyat-e Gharbi Rural District. (Note: Formerly Basharyat Rural District) The village of Khak-e Ali was converted to a city in 2004.

== Demographics ==
=== Population ===
At the time of the 2006 National Census, the city's population was 3,146 in 790 households. The following census in 2011 counted 3,352 people in 1,000 households. The 2016 census measured the population of the city as 3,148 people in 1,001 households.
