= Chaman Bid, North Khorasan =

Village in North Khorasan province, Iran

Chaman Bid Persian: چمن بيد
- Village
- Location within Iran
- Coordinates: 37°25′46″N 56°33′02″E
- Country: Iran
- Province: North Khorasan
- County: Samalqan
- District: Samalqan
- Rural District: Almeh

Population (2016)
  - Total: 1,427
- Time zone: UTC+3:30 (IRST)

Chaman Bid (Persian: چمن بيد) (Note: Also Romanized as Chaman Bīd, Chaman-e Bīd, Chaman-e-Bid, and Chaman-i-Bid) is a village in Almeh Rural District of Samalqan District in Samalqan County, (Note: Formerly Maneh and Samalqan County) North Khorasan province, Iran.

== Demographics ==
=== Population ===
At the time of the 2006 National Census, the village's population was 1,393 in 349 households. The following census in 2011 counted 1,456 people in 429 households. The 2016 census measured the population of the village as 1,427 people in 448 households.
