= Darkesh =

Village in North Khorasan province, Iran

Darkesh Persian: دركش
- Village
- Location within Iran
- Coordinates: 37°26′26″N 56°44′47″E
- Country: Iran
- Province: North Khorasan
- County: Samalqan
- District: Samalqan
- Rural District: Almeh

Population (2016)
  - Total: 1,027
- Time zone: UTC+3:30 (IRST)

Darkesh (Persian: دركش) is a village in Almeh Rural District of Samalqan District in Samalqan County, (Note: Formerly Maneh and Samalqan County) North Khorasan province, Iran.

== Demographics ==
=== Population ===
At the time of the 2006 National Census, the village's population was 872 in 218 households. The following census in 2011 counted 927 people in 273 households. The 2016 census measured the population of the village as 1,027 people in 316 households.
