= Chaman Bid, Fars =

Chaman Bid چمن بيد
- Village
- Location within Iran
- Coordinates: 29°58′49″N 52°01′58″E
- Country: Iran
- Province: Fars
- County: Sepidan
- Bakhsh: Hamaijan
- Rural District: Hamaijan

Population (2006)
  - Total: 195
- Time zone: UTC+3:30 (IRST)
  - Summer (DST): UTC+4:30 (IRDT)

Chaman Bid (Persian: چمن بيد, also Romanized as Chaman Bīd) is a village in Hamaijan Rural District, Hamaijan District, Sepidan County, Fars province, Iran. At the 2006 census, its population was 195, in 44 families.
