= Zargar, South Khorasan =

Zargar زرگر
- Village
- Location within Iran
- Coordinates: 32°42′37″N 59°15′08″E
- Country: Iran
- Province: South Khorasan
- County: Khusf
- Bakhsh: Jolgeh-e Mazhan
- Rural District: Barakuh

Population (2006)
  - Total: 50
- Time zone: UTC+3:30 (IRST)
  - Summer (DST): UTC+4:30 (IRDT)

Zargar (Persian: زرگر) is a village in Barakuh Rural District, Jolgeh-e Mazhan District, Khusf County, South Khorasan Province, Iran. As of the 2006 census, its population was 50, in 21 families.
