= Zargari (surname) =

Zargari (Persian: زرگری; Hebrew: זרגרי) is a surname. The name comes from the Persian word زرگر (zargar), meaning "goldsmith". Notable people with the surname include:

- Amir Zargari (born 1980), Iranian racing cyclist
- Aviel Zargari (born 2002), Israeli football defensive midfielder
- Navid Zargari, electrical engineer at Rockwell Automation Canada
