= Helalabad, Fars =

Helalabad هلال اباد
- Village
- Location within Iran
- Coordinates: 29°29′22″N 53°25′23″E
- Country: Iran
- Province: Fars
- County: Kharameh
- Bakhsh: Central
- Rural District: Korbal

Population (2006)
  - Total: 407
- Time zone: UTC+3:30 (IRST)
  - Summer (DST): UTC+4:30 (IRDT)

Helalabad (Persian: هلال اباد, also Romanized as Helālābād) is a village in Korbal Rural District, in the Central District of Kharameh County, Fars province, Iran. At the 2006 census, its population was 407, in 97 families.
