= Zargari, Afghanistan =

Zargari زرگری
- Location within Afghanistan
- Coordinates: 33.492063°N 68.372661°E
- Country: Afghanistan
- Province: Ghazni

Zargari (Dari: زرگری) also known as Zargar is a village in Ghazni Province, Afghanistan. The official languages in the province are Pasto and Dari.

== See also ==
- Ghazni Province
