= Chaman-e Bid, Afghanistan =

Chaman-e Bid
- Location in Afghanistan
- Coordinates: 35°14′53″N 64°7′6″E
- Country: Afghanistan
- Province: Badghis Province
- Time zone: + 4.30

Chaman-e Bid is a village in Badghis Province in north western Afghanistan.
