= Shahrabad, Kerman =

Shahrabad شهراباد
- Village
- Location within Iran
- Coordinates: 30°25′21″N 55°51′17″E
- Country: Iran
- Province: Kerman
- County: Rafsanjan
- Bakhsh: Central
- Rural District: Eslamiyeh

Population (2006)
  - Total: 129
- Time zone: UTC+3:30 (IRST)
  - Summer (DST): UTC+4:30 (IRDT)

Shahrabad (Persian: شهراباد, also Romanized as Shahrābād) is a village in Eslamiyeh Rural District, in the Central District of Rafsanjan County, Kerman Province, Iran. At the 2006 census, its population was 129, in 32 families.
