= Zargar-e Olya =

Zargar-e Olya زرگرعليا
- Village
- Location within Iran
- Coordinates: 29°35′27″N 56°21′50″E
- Country: Iran
- Province: Kerman
- County: Sirjan
- Bakhsh: Central
- Rural District: Chahar Gonbad

Population (2006)
  - Total: 16
- Time zone: UTC+3:30 (IRST)
  - Summer (DST): UTC+4:30 (IRDT)

Zargar-e Olya (Persian: زرگرعليا, also Romanized as Zargar-e ‘Olyā) is a village in Chahar Gonbad Rural District, in the Central District of Sirjan County, Kerman Province, Iran. At the 2006 census, its population was 16, in 5 families.
