= Jowzak =

Village in North Khorasan province, Iran

Jowzak Persian: جوزك
- Village
- Location within Iran
- Coordinates: 37°25′48″N 56°41′30″E
- Country: Iran
- Province: North Khorasan
- County: Samalqan
- District: Samalqan
- Rural District: Almeh

Population (2016)
  - Total: 189
- Time zone: UTC+3:30 (IRST)

Jowzak (Persian: جوزك) (Note: Also romanized as Jozak; also known as Juza) is a village in Almeh Rural District of Samalqan District in Samalqan County, (Note: Formerly Maneh and Samalqan County) North Khorasan province, Iran.

== Demographics ==
=== Population ===
At the time of the 2006 National Census, the village's population was 219 in 58 households. The following census in 2011 counted 201 people in 59 households. The 2016 census measured the population of the village as 189 people in 63 households.
