= Zargar, East Azerbaijan =

Zargar زرگر
- Village
- Location within Iran
- Coordinates: 38°24′32″N 47°06′47″E
- Country: Iran
- Province: East Azerbaijan
- County: Ahar
- Bakhsh: Central
- Rural District: Bozkosh

Population (2006)
  - Total: 90
- Time zone: UTC+3:30 (IRST)
  - Summer (DST): UTC+4:30 (IRDT)

Zargar (Persian: زرگر; also known as Zarrīn) is a village in Bozkosh Rural District, in the Central District of Ahar County, East Azerbaijan Province, Iran. At the 2006 census, its population was 90, in 15 families.
