= Shahrabad Rural District =

Shahrabad Rural District (Persian: دهستان شهرآباد) may refer to:

- Shahrabad Rural District (Razavi Khorasan Province)
- Shahrabad Rural District (Firuzkuh County), Tehran province
