= Abyek =

City in Qazvin province, Iran

Abyek Persian: آبیک
- City
- Location within Iran
- Coordinates: 36°02′27″N 50°31′50″E
- Country: Iran
- Province: Qazvin
- County: Abyek
- District: Central

Population (2016)
  - Total: 60,107
- Time zone: UTC+3:30 (IRST)

Abyek (Persian: آبیک) (Note: Also romanized as Abiak, Abiyek, and Ābyek; also known as Abiak Sarāi) is a city in the Central District of Abyek County, Qazvin province, Iran, serving as capital of both the county and the district. Abyek lies roughly halfway between Qazvin to the northwest and Karaj to the southeast. It has a major cement factory, which is responsible for air pollution in the area.

== Demographics ==
=== Ethnicity ===
Most of the inhabitants of the city are Turkics.

=== Population ===
At the time of the 2006 National Census, the city's population was 47,233 in 11,989 households. The following census in 2011 counted 55,779 people in 15,917 households. The 2016 census measured the population of the city as 60,107 people in 18,520 households.

== See also ==
Media related to Abyek at Wikimedia Commons
