= Basharyat-e Gharbi Rural District =

Rural district in Qazvin province, Iran

Basharyat-e Gharbi Rural District Persian: دهستان بشاریات غربی
- Rural District
- Location within Iran
- Coordinates: 36°02′N 50°10′E
- Country: Iran
- Province: Qazvin
- County: Abyek
- District: Basharyat
- Established: 1987
- Capital: Khak-e Ali

Population (2016)
  - Total: 7,549
- Time zone: UTC+3:30 (IRST)

Basharyat-e Gharbi Rural District (Persian: دهستان بشاریات غربی) (Note: Formerly Basharyat Rural District (دهستان بشاريات)) is in Basharyat District of Abyek County, Qazvin province, Iran. It is administered from the city of Khak-e Ali.

== Demographics ==
=== Population ===
At the time of the 2006 National Census, the rural district's population was 10,556 in 2,566 households. There were 8,306 inhabitants in 2,392 households at the following census of 2011. The 2016 census measured the population of the rural district as 7,549 in 2,305 households. The most populous of its 16 villages was Abdolabad, with 1,369 people.

=== Other villages in the rural district ===
- Eslamabad
- Gil Zur
- Hezar Jolfa
- Khorram Poshteh
- Murabad
- Nowduz
