= Zargar, Qazvin =

Village in Qazvin province, Iran

Zargar Persian: زرگر
- Village
- Location within Iran
- Coordinates: 36°03′22″N 50°22′57″E
- Country: Iran
- Province: Qazvin
- County: Abyek
- District: Basharyat
- Rural District: Basharyat-e Sharqi

Population (2016)
  - Total: 588
- Time zone: UTC+3:30 (IRST)

Zargar (Persian: زرگر) is a village in Basharyat-e Sharqi Rural District of Basharyat District in Abyek County, Qazvin province, Iran.

== Demographics ==
=== Population ===
At the time of the 2006 National Census, the village's population was 750 in 182 households. The following census in 2011 counted 627 people in 190 households. The 2016 census measured the population of the village as 588 people in 187 households.
