= Kuhpayeh-e Gharbi Rural District =

Rural district in Qazvin province, Iran

Kuhpayeh-e Gharbi Rural District Persian: دهستان کوهپایه غربی
- Rural District
- Location within Iran
- Coordinates: 36°13′N 50°18′E
- Country: Iran
- Province: Qazvin
- County: Abyek
- District: Central
- Established: 1987
- Capital: Kundaj

Population (2016)
  - Total: 3,066
- Time zone: UTC+3:30 (IRST)

Kuhpayeh-e Gharbi Rural District (Persian: دهستان کوهپایه غربی) is in the Central District of Abyek County, Qazvin province, Iran. Its capital is the village of Kundaj.

== Demographics ==
=== Population ===
At the time of the 2006 National Census, the rural district's population was 4,157 in 1,227 households. There were 2,798 inhabitants in 910 households at the following census of 2011. The 2016 census measured the population of the rural district as 3,066 in 1,065 households. The most populous of its 18 villages was Kundaj, with 1,509 people.

=== Other villages in the rural district ===
- Amrudak
- Anjilaq
- Chanasak
- Now Deh
- Shekarnab
- Zarjeh Bostan
