= Basharyat-e Sharqi Rural District =

Rural district in Qazvin province, Iran

Basharyat-e Sharqi Rural District Persian: دهستان بشاریات شرقی
- Rural District
- Location within Iran
- Coordinates: 35°59′N 50°21′E
- Country: Iran
- Province: Qazvin
- County: Abyek
- District: Basharyat
- Established: 2001
- Capital: Khatayan

Population (2016)
  - Total: 5,682
- Time zone: UTC+3:30 (IRST)

Basharyat-e Sharqi Rural District (Persian: دهستان بشاریات شرقی) is in Basharyat District of Abyek County, Qazvin province, Iran. Its capital is the village of Khatayan.

== Demographics ==
=== Population ===
At the time of the 2006 National Census, the rural district's population was 7,282 in 1,865 households. There were 6,193 inhabitants in 1,880 households at the following census of 2011. The 2016 census measured the population of the rural district as 5,682 in 1,830 households. The most populous of its 22 villages was Khatayan, with 802 people.

=== Other villages in the rural district ===
- Baqerabad-e Kord
- Hajji Tappeh
- Khakashan
- Mahmudian
- Qarah Qobad
- Zagheh
- Zargar
