= Kuhpayeh-e Sharqi Rural District =

Rural district in Qazvin province, Iran

Kuhpayeh-e Sharqi Rural District Persian: دهستان کوهپایه شرقی
- Rural District
- Location within Iran
- Coordinates: 36°09′N 50°25′E
- Country: Iran
- Province: Qazvin
- County: Abyek
- District: Central
- Established: 1987
- Capital: Naserabad

Population (2016)
  - Total: 4,614
- Time zone: UTC+3:30 (IRST)

Kuhpayeh-e Sharqi Rural District (Persian: دهستان کوهپایه شرقی) is in the Central District of Abyek County, Qazvin province, Iran. Its capital is the village of Naserabad.

== Demographics ==
=== Population ===
At the time of the 2006 National Census, the rural district's population was 4,936 in 1,392 households. There were 5,668 inhabitants in 1,299 households at the following census of 2011. The 2016 census measured the population of the rural district as 4,614 in 1,193 households. The most populous of its 22 villages was Naserabad, with 1,477 people.

=== Other villages in the rural district ===
- Asgharabad
- Behjatabad
- Falizan
- Jazmeh
- Tazehabad
- Yanesabad
