= Qazi Rural District =

Rural district in North Khorasan province, Iran

Qazi Rural District Persian: دهستان قاضی
- Rural District
- Location within Iran
- Coordinates: 37°31′N 56°34′E
- Country: Iran
- Province: North Khorasan
- County: Samalqan
- District: Samalqan
- Capital: Qazi

Population (2016)
  - Total: 7,169
- Time zone: UTC+3:30 (IRST)

Qazi Rural District (Persian: دهستان قاضی) (Note: Formerly Samalqan Rural District (دهستان سملقان)) is in Samalqan District of Samalqan County, (Note: Formerly Maneh and Samalqan County) North Khorasan province, Iran. It is administered from the city of Qazi.

== Demographics ==
=== Population ===
At the time of the 2006 National Census, the rural district's population was 10,734 in 2,812 households. There were 11,513 inhabitants in 3,363 households at the following census of 2011. The 2016 census measured the population of the rural district as 7,169 in 2,229 households. The most populous of its 23 villages was Zard, with 2,472 people.

=== Other villages in the rural district ===
- Azizabad
- Kalateh-ye Abbas Javini
- Kalateh-ye Ghamu
- Kalateh-ye Tashi
- Kastan
- Langar
- Qaleh Khan
