= Ziaran Rural District =

Rural district in Qazvin province, Iran

Ziaran Rural District Persian: دهستان زياران
- Rural District
- Location within Iran
- Coordinates: 36°06′N 50°32′E
- Country: Iran
- Province: Qazvin
- County: Abyek
- District: Central
- Established: 1987
- Capital: Khuznan

Population (2016)
  - Total: 10,370
- Time zone: UTC+3:30 (IRST)

Ziaran Rural District (Persian: دهستان زياران) is in the Central District of Abyek County, Qazvin province, Iran. Its capital is the village of Khuznan. The previous capital of the rural district was the village of Ziaran (now a city).

== Demographics ==
=== Language ===
Tati is the main language of the rural district.

=== Population ===
At the time of the 2006 National Census, the rural district's population was 12,024 in 3,303 households. There were 11,748 inhabitants in 3,556 households at the following census of 2011. The 2016 census measured the population of the rural district as 10,370 in 3,320 households. The most populous of its 16 villages was Qeshlaq (now a city), with 3,798 people.

=== Other villages in the rural district ===
- Abyek-e Sofla
- Amadgah Abyek
- Aqchari
- Hoseynabad-e Kord
- Miankuh
- Samghabad
