= Basharyat District =

District in Qazvin province, Iran

Basharyat District Persian: بخش بشاریات
- District
- Location within Iran
- Coordinates: 36°00′N 50°16′E
- Country: Iran
- Province: Qazvin
- County: Abyek
- Established: 2001
- Capital: Khak-e Ali

Population (2016)
  - Total: 16,379
- Time zone: UTC+3:30 (IRST)

Basharyat District (Persian: بخش بشاریات) is in Abyek County, Qazvin province, Iran. Its capital is the city of Khak-e Ali.

== Demographics ==
=== Population ===
At the time of the 2006 National Census, the district's population was 20,984 in 5,221 households. The following census in 2011 counted 17,851 people in 5,272 households. The 2016 census measured the population of the district as 16,379 inhabitants in 5,136 households.

=== Administrative divisions ===
Basharyat District Population
Administrative Divisions	2006	2011	2016
Basharyat-e Gharbi RD (Note: Formerly Basharyat Rural District)	10,556	8,306	7,549
Basharyat-e Sharqi RD	7,282	6,193	5,682
Khak-e Ali (city)	3,146	3,352	3,148
Total	20,984	17,851	16,379
RD = Rural District
