= Samalqan District =

District in North Khorasan province, Iran

Samalqan District Persian: بخش سملقان
- District
- Location within Iran
- Coordinates: 37°27′N 56°29′E
- Country: Iran
- Province: North Khorasan
- County: Samalqan
- Established: 2001
- Capital: Qazi

Population (2016)
  - Total: 21,378
- Time zone: UTC+3:30 (IRST)

Samalqan District (Persian: بخش سملقان) is in Samalqan County, (Note: Formerly Maneh and Samalqan County) North Khorasan province, Iran. Its capital is the city of Qazi.

== History ==
In 2013, two villages merged to form the new city of Ava.

== Demographics ==
=== Population ===
At the time of the 2006 National Census, the district's population was 20,621 in 5,466 households. The following census in 2011 counted 22,335 people in 6,464 households. The 2016 census measured the population of the district as 21,378 inhabitants in 6,738 households.

=== Administrative divisions ===
Samalqan District Population
Administrative Divisions	2006	2011	2016
Almeh RD	7,517	7,866	7,788
Qazi RD (Note: Formerly Samalqan Rural District)	10,734	11,513	7,169
Ava (city) (Note: Merger of two villages)			3,993
Qazi (city)	2,370	2,956	2,428
Total	20,621	22,335	21,378
RD = Rural District
