= Central District (Abyek County) =

District in Qazvin province, Iran

Central District (Abyek County) Persian: بخش مرکزی شهرستان آبیک
- District
- Location within Iran
- Coordinates: 36°10′N 50°27′E
- Country: Iran
- Province: Qazvin
- County: Abyek
- Established: 2001
- Capital: Abyek

Population (2016)
  - Total: 78,157
- Time zone: UTC+3:30 (IRST)

The Central District of Abyek County (Persian: بخش مرکزی شهرستان آبیک) is in Qazvin province, Iran. Its capital is the city of Abyek.

== History ==
The villages of Qeshlaq and Ziaran were converted to cities in 2020.

== Demographics ==
=== Population ===
At the time of the 2006 National Census, the district's population was 68,350 in 17,911 households. The following census in 2011 counted 75,993 people in 21,682 households. The 2016 census measured the population of the district as 78,157 inhabitants in 24,098 households.

=== Administrative divisions ===
Central District (Abyek County) Population
| Administrative Divisions | 2006 | 2011 | 2016 |
|---|---|---|---|
| Kuhpayeh-e Gharbi RD | 4,157 | 2,798 | 3,066 |
| Kuhpayeh-e Sharqi RD | 4,936 | 5,668 | 4,614 |
| Ziaran RD | 12,024 | 11,748 | 10,370 |
| Abyek (city) | 47,233 | 55,779 | 60,107 |
| Qeshlaq (city) (Note: Became a city after the 2016 census) | | | |
| Ziaran (city) | | | |
| Total | 68,350 | 75,993 | 78,157 |
RD = Rural District
