= Abyek County =

County in Qazvin province, Iran

Abyek County Persian: شهرستان آبیک
- County
- Location of Abyek County in Qazvin province (right, green)

- Location of Qazvin province in Iran
- Coordinates: 36°06′N 50°23′E
- Country: Iran
- Province: Qazvin
- Established: 2001
- Capital: Abyek
- Districts: Central, Basharyat

Population (2016)
  - Total: 94,536
- Time zone: UTC+3:30 (IRST)

Abyek County (Persian: شهرستان آبیک) is in Qazvin province, Iran. Its capital is the city of Abyek.

== History ==
In 2020, the villages of Qeshlaq and Ziaran were converted to cities.

== Demographics ==
=== Ethnicity ===
The majority of Abyek County's people are Azerbaijani Turks.

=== Population ===
At the time of the 2006 National Census, the county's population was 89,334 in 23,132 households. The following census in 2011 counted 93,844 people in 26,944 households. The 2016 census measured the population of the county as 94,536 in 29,234 households.

=== Administrative divisions ===
Abyek County's population history and administrative structure over three consecutive censuses are shown in the following table.

Abyek County Population
Administrative Divisions	2006	2011	2016
Central District	68,350	75,993	78,157
Kuhpayeh-e Gharbi RD	4,157	2,798	3,066
Kuhpayeh-e Sharqi RD	4,936	5,668	4,614
Ziaran RD	12,024	11,748	10,370
Abyek (city)	47,233	55,779	60,107
Qeshlaq (city) (Note: Became a city after the 2016 census)			
Ziaran (city)			
Basharyat District	20,984	17,851	16,379
Basharyat-e Gharbi RD (Note: Formerly Basharyat Rural District)	10,556	8,306	7,549
Basharyat-e Sharqi RD	7,282	6,193	5,682
Khak-e Ali (city)	3,146	3,352	3,148
Total	89,334	93,844	94,536
RD = Rural District

== See also ==
Media related to Abyek County at Wikimedia Commons
