= Qush Aghel =

Village in Razavi Khorasan province, Iran

Qush Aghel Persian: قوش اغل
- Village
- Location within Iran
- Coordinates: 35°44′47″N 58°55′19″E
- Country: Iran
- Province: Razavi Khorasan
- County: Miyan Jolgeh
- District: Belharat
- Rural District: Salari

Population (2016)
  - Total: 82
- Time zone: UTC+3:30 (IRST)

Qush Aghel (Persian: قوش اغل) (Note: Also romanized as Qūsh Āghel; also known as Qūshābād (قوش اباد)) is a village in Salari Rural District of Belharat District in Miyan Jolgeh County, Razavi Khorasan province, Iran.

== Demographics ==
=== Population ===
At the time of the 2006 National Census, the village's population was 135 in 33 households, when it was in Belharat Rural District of the former Miyan Jolgeh District (Note: Renamed the Central District of Miyan Jolgeh County) in Nishapur County. The following census in 2011 counted 188 people in 57 households. The 2016 census measured the population of the village as 82 people in 28 households.

In 2023, the district was separated from the county in the establishment of Miyan Jolgeh County and renamed the Central District. The rural district was transferred to the new Belharat District, and Qush Aghel was transferred to Salari Rural District created in the same district.
