= Anbarkeh =

Village in Razavi Khorasan province, Iran

Anbarkeh Persian: عنبركه
- Village
- Location within Iran
- Coordinates: 35°46′19″N 58°50′14″E
- Country: Iran
- Province: Razavi Khorasan
- County: Miyan Jolgeh
- District: Belharat
- Rural District: Salari

Population (2016)
  - Total: 345
- Time zone: UTC+3:30 (IRST)

Anbarkeh (Persian: عنبركه) (Note: Also romanized as ‘Anbarkeh) is a village in Salari Rural District of Belharat District in Miyan Jolgeh County, Razavi Khorasan province, Iran.

== Demographics ==
=== Population ===
At the time of the 2006 National Census, the village's population was 331 in 92 households, when it was in Belharat Rural District of the former Miyan Jolgeh District (Note: Renamed the Central District of Miyan Jolgeh County) in Nishapur County. The following census in 2011 counted 324 people in 107 households. The 2016 census measured the population of the village as 345 people in 111 households.

In 2023, the district was separated from the county in the establishment of Miyan Jolgeh County and renamed the Central District. The rural district was transferred to the new Belharat District, and Anbarkeh was transferred to Salari Rural District created in the same district.
