= Eshratabad, Miyan Jolgeh =

Village in Razavi Khorasan province, Iran

Eshratabad Persian: عشرت اباد
- Village
- Location within Iran
- Coordinates: 35°47′49″N 58°52′40″E
- Country: Iran
- Province: Razavi Khorasan
- County: Miyan Jolgeh
- District: Belharat
- Rural District: Salari

Population (2016)
  - Total: 260
- Time zone: UTC+3:30 (IRST)

Eshratabad (Persian: عشرت اباد) (Note: Also romanized as ‘Ashratābād and ‘Eshratābād; also known as ‘Eshratābād-e Jadīd and ‘Eyshratābād-e Jadīd) is a village in Salari Rural District of Belharat District in Miyan Jolgeh County, Razavi Khorasan province, Iran.

== Demographics ==
=== Population ===
At the time of the 2006 National Census, the village's population was 279 in 77 households, when it was in Belharat Rural District of the former Miyan Jolgeh District (Note: Renamed the Central District of Miyan Jolgeh County) in Nishapur County. The following census in 2011 counted 303 people in 106 households. The 2016 census measured the population of the village as 260 people in 88 households.

In 2023, the district was separated from the county in the establishment of Miyan Jolgeh County and renamed the Central District. The rural district was transferred to the new Belharat District, and Eshratabad was transferred to Salari Rural District created in the same district.
