= Salari, Razavi Khorasan =

Village in Razavi Khorasan province, Iran

Salari Persian: سالاري
- Village
- Location within Iran
- Coordinates: 35°52′30″N 58°51′30″E
- Country: Iran
- Province: Razavi Khorasan
- County: Miyan Jolgeh
- District: Belharat
- Rural District: Salari

Population (2016)
  - Total: 978
- Time zone: UTC+3:30 (IRST)

Salari (Persian: سالاري) (Note: Also romanized as Sālārī) is a village in, and the capital of, Salari Rural District in Belharat District of Miyan Jolgeh County, Razavi Khorasan province, Iran.

== Demographics ==
=== Population ===
At the time of the 2006 National Census, the village's population was 783 in 214 households, when it was in Belharat Rural District of the former Miyan Jolgeh District (Note: Renamed the Central District of Miyan Jolgeh County) in Nishapur County. The following census in 2011 counted 920 people in 285 households. The 2016 census measured the population of the village as 978 people in 297 households.

In 2023, the district was separated from the county in the establishment of Miyan Jolgeh County and renamed the Central District. The rural district was transferred to the new Belharat District, and Salari was transferred to Salari Rural District created in the same district.
