= Homai, Razavi Khorasan =

Village in Razavi Khorasan province, Iran

Homai Persian: همايي
- Village
- Location within Iran
- Coordinates: 35°51′23″N 58°54′45″E
- Country: Iran
- Province: Razavi Khorasan
- County: Miyan Jolgeh
- District: Belharat
- Rural District: Salari

Population (2016)
  - Total: 732
- Time zone: UTC+3:30 (IRST)

Homai (Persian: همايي) (Note: Also romanized as Homā’ī) is a village in Salari Rural District of Belharat District in Miyan Jolgeh County, Razavi Khorasan province, Iran.

== Demographics ==
=== Population ===
At the time of the 2006 National Census, the village's population was 573 in 138 households, when it was in Belharat Rural District of the former Miyan Jolgeh District (Note: Renamed the Central District of Miyan Jolgeh County) in Nishapur County. The following census in 2011 counted 600 people in 173 households. The 2016 census measured the population of the village as 732 people in 236 households.

In 2023, the district was separated from the county in the establishment of Miyan Jolgeh County and renamed the Central District. The rural district was transferred to the new Belharat District, and Homai was transferred to Salari Rural District created in the same district.
