= Dehnow, Miyan Jolgeh =

Village in Razavi Khorasan province, Iran

Dehnow Persian: ده نو
- Village
- Location within Iran
- Coordinates: 35°48′00″N 58°47′27″E
- Country: Iran
- Province: Razavi Khorasan
- County: Miyan Jolgeh
- District: Belharat
- Rural District: Salari

Population (2016)
  - Total: 252
- Time zone: UTC+3:30 (IRST)

Dehnow (Persian: ده نو) (Note: Also known as Deh-i-Nau and Dehnau) is a village in Salari Rural District of Belharat District in Miyan Jolgeh County, Razavi Khorasan province, Iran.

== Demographics ==
=== Population ===
At the time of the 2006 National Census, the village's population was 251 in 67 households, when it was in Belharat Rural District of the former Miyan Jolgeh District (Note: Renamed the Central District of Miyan Jolgeh County) in Nishapur County. The following census in 2011 counted 271 people in 87 households. At the 2016 census, the population was 252 people in 78 households.

In 2023, the district was separated from the county in the establishment of Miyan Jolgeh County and renamed the Central District. The rural district was transferred to the new Belharat District, and Dehnow was transferred to Salari Rural District created in the same district.

Dehnow was among the villages that suffered severe damage in the 2004 Nishapur train disaster.
