= Golbui-ye Bala =

Village in Razavi Khorasan province, Iran

Golbui-ye Bala Persian: گلبوي بالا
- Village
- Location within Iran
- Coordinates: 35°45′49″N 58°51′05″E
- Country: Iran
- Province: Razavi Khorasan
- County: Miyan Jolgeh
- District: Belharat
- Rural District: Salari

Population (2016)
  - Total: 344
- Time zone: UTC+3:30 (IRST)

Golbui-ye Bala (Persian: گلبوي بالا) (Note: Also romanized as Golbūī-ye Bālā; also known as Golbū, Golbū ‘Olyā, and Golbū-ye Bālā) is a village in Salari Rural District of Belharat District in Miyan Jolgeh County, Razavi Khorasan province, Iran.

== Demographics ==
=== Population ===
At the time of the 2006 National Census, the village's population was 372 in 107 households, when it was in Belharat Rural District of the former Miyan Jolgeh District (Note: Renamed the Central District of Miyan Jolgeh County) in Nishapur County. The following census in 2011 counted 363 people in 124 households. The 2016 census measured the population of the village as 344 people in 115 households.

In 2023, the district was separated from the county in the establishment of Miyan Jolgeh County and renamed the Central District. The rural district was transferred to the new Belharat District, and Golbui-ye Bala was transferred to Salari Rural District created in the same district.
