= Rigi, Miyan Jolgeh =

Village in Razavi Khorasan province, Iran

Rigi Persian: ريگي
- Village
- Location within Iran
- Coordinates: 35°46′28″N 58°43′28″E
- Country: Iran
- Province: Razavi Khorasan
- County: Miyan Jolgeh
- District: Belharat
- Rural District: Belharat

Population (2016)
  - Total: 1,658
- Time zone: UTC+3:30 (IRST)

Rigi (Persian: ريگي) (Note: Also romanized as Rīgī) is a village in, and the capital of, Belharat Rural District in Belharat District of Miyan Jolgeh County, Razavi Khorasan province, Iran. The previous capital of the rural district was the village of Golbui-ye Pain, now in Salari Rural District.

== Demographics ==
=== Population ===
At the time of the 2006 National Census, the village's population was 1,553 in 394 households, when it was in Miyan Jolgeh District (Note: Renamed the Central District of Miyan Jolgeh County) of Nishapur County. The following census in 2011 counted 1,598 people in 471 households. The 2016 census measured the population of the village as 1,658 people in 491 households, the most populous in its rural district.

In 2023, the district was separated from the county in the establishment of Miyan Jolgeh County and renamed the Central District. The rural district was transferred to the new Belharat District.
