= Astayesh =

Village in Razavi Khorasan province, Iran

Astayesh Persian: استايش
- Village
- Location within Iran
- Coordinates: 35°40′53″N 58°38′18″E
- Country: Iran
- Province: Razavi Khorasan
- County: Miyan Jolgeh
- District: Belharat
- Rural District: Belharat

Population (2016)
  - Total: 686
- Time zone: UTC+3:30 (IRST)

Astayesh (Persian: استايش) (Note: Also romanized as Āstāyesh and Estāyesh) is a village in Belharat Rural District of Belharat District in Miyan Jolgeh County, Razavi Khorasan province, Iran.

== Demographics ==
=== Population ===
At the time of the 2006 National Census, the village's population was 689 in 177 households, when it was in Miyan Jolgeh District (Note: Renamed the Central District of Miyan Jolgeh County) of Nishapur County. The following census in 2011 counted 639 people in 184 households. The 2016 census measured the population of the village as 686 people in 208 households.

In 2023, the district was separated from the county in the establishment of Miyan Jolgeh County and renamed the Central District. The rural district was transferred to the new Belharat District.
