= Ardameh, Miyan Jolgeh =

Village in Razavi Khorasan province, Iran

Ardameh Persian: اردمه
- Village
- Location within Iran
- Coordinates: 36°01′59″N 58°32′36″E
- Country: Iran
- Province: Razavi Khorasan
- County: Miyan Jolgeh
- District: Central
- Rural District: Eshqabad

Population (2016)
  - Total: 2,421
- Time zone: UTC+3:30 (IRST)

Ardameh (Persian: اردمه) (Note: Also known as Ardaheh) is a village in Eshqabad Rural District of the Central District (Note: Formerly Miyan Jolgeh District of Nishapur County) in Miyan Jolgeh County, Razavi Khorasan province, Iran.

== Demographics ==
=== Population ===
At the time of the 2006 National Census, the village's population was 1,775 in 455 households, when it was in Miyan Jolgeh District (Note: Renamed the Central District of Miyan Jolgeh County) of Nishapur County. The following census in 2011 counted 2,175 people in 583 households. The 2016 census measured the population of the village as 2,421 people in 687 households, the most populous in its rural district.

In 2023, the district was separated from the county in the establishment of Miyan Jolgeh County and renamed the Central District.
