= Kushk, Miyan Jolgeh =

Village in Razavi Khorasan province, Iran

Kushk Persian: كوشك
- Village
- Location within Iran
- Country: Iran
- Province: Razavi Khorasan
- County: Miyan Jolgeh
- District: Central
- Rural District: Eshqabad

Population (2016)
  - Total: 277
- Time zone: UTC+3:30 (IRST)

Kushk (Persian: كوشك) (Note: Also romanized as Kūshk; also known as Kūshkak (كوشكك)) is a village in Eshqabad Rural District of the Central District (Note: Formerly Miyan Jolgeh District of Nishapur County) in Miyan Jolgeh County, Razavi Khorasan province, Iran.

== Demographics ==
=== Population ===
At the time of the 2006 National Census, the village's population was 243 in 65 households, when it was in Miyan Jolgeh District (Note: Renamed the Central District of Miyan Jolgeh County) of Nishapur County. The following census in 2011 counted 234 people in 71 households. The 2016 census measured the population of the village as 277 people in 85 households.

In 2023, the district was separated from the county in the establishment of Miyan Jolgeh County and renamed the Central District.
