= Gol Qandasht =

Village in Razavi Khorasan province, Iran

Gol Qandasht Persian: گلقندشت
- Village
- Location within Iran
- Coordinates: 36°00′54″N 58°31′21″E
- Country: Iran
- Province: Razavi Khorasan
- County: Miyan Jolgeh
- District: Central
- Rural District: Ghazali

Population (2016)
  - Total: 511
- Time zone: UTC+3:30 (IRST)

Gol Qandasht (Persian: گلقندشت) is a village in Ghazali Rural District of the Central District (Note: Formerly Miyan Jolgeh District of Nishapur County) in Miyan Jolgeh County, Razavi Khorasan province, Iran.

== Demographics ==
=== Population ===
At the time of the 2006 National Census, the village's population was 483 in 120 households, when it was in Miyan Jolgeh District (Note: Renamed the Central District of Miyan Jolgeh County) of Nishapur County. The following census in 2011 counted 457 people in 140 households. The 2016 census measured the population of the village as 511 people in 171 households.

In 2023, the district was separated from the county in the establishment of Miyan Jolgeh County and renamed the Central District.
