= Rizab, Miyan Jolgeh =

Village in Razavi Khorasan province, Iran

Rizab Persian: ريزاب
- Village
- Location within Iran
- Coordinates: 35°55′17″N 58°20′52″E
- Country: Iran
- Province: Razavi Khorasan
- County: Miyan Jolgeh
- District: Central
- Rural District: Ghazali

Population (2016)
  - Total: 801
- Time zone: UTC+3:30 (IRST)

Rizab (Persian: ريزاب) (Note: Also romanized as Rīzāb; also known as Zīrāb) is a village in Ghazali Rural District of the Central District (Note: Formerly Miyan Jolgeh District of Nishapur County) in Miyan Jolgeh County, Razavi Khorasan province, Iran.

== Demographics ==
=== Population ===
At the time of the 2006 National Census, the village's population was 727 in 174 households, when it was in Miyan Jolgeh District (Note: Renamed the Central District of Miyan Jolgeh County) of Nishapur County. The following census in 2011 counted 766 people in 206 households. The 2016 census measured the population of the village as 801 people in 227 households.

In 2023, the district was separated from the county in the establishment of Miyan Jolgeh County and renamed the Central District.
