= Zammeh =

Zammeh and Zameh and Zemeh (Persian: ذمه) may refer to:

- Zammeh, Razavi Khorasan
- Zemeh, West Azerbaijan
