= Naimabad, Miyan Jolgeh =

Village in Razavi Khorasan province, Iran

Naimabad Persian: نعيماباد
- Village
- Location within Iran
- Coordinates: 36°02′22″N 58°43′33″E
- Country: Iran
- Province: Razavi Khorasan
- County: Miyan Jolgeh
- District: Central
- Rural District: Eshqabad

Population (2016)
  - Total: 133
- Time zone: UTC+3:30 (IRST)

Naimabad (Persian: نعيماباد) (Note: Also romanized as Na‘īmābād; also known as Ma‘nābād) is a village in Eshqabad Rural District of the Central District (Note: Formerly Miyan Jolgeh District of Nishapur County) in Miyan Jolgeh County, Razavi Khorasan province, Iran.

== Demographics ==
=== Population ===
At the time of the 2006 National Census, the village's population was 141 in 37 households, when it was in Miyan Jolgeh District (Note: Renamed the Central District of Miyan Jolgeh County) of Nishapur County. The following census in 2011 counted 121 people in 40 households. The 2016 census measured the population of the village as 133 people in 50 households.

In 2023, the district was separated from the county in the establishment of Miyan Jolgeh County and renamed the Central District.
