= Hesar Now, Miyan Jolgeh =

Village in Razavi Khorasan province, Iran

Hesar Now Persian: حصارنو
- Village
- Location within Iran
- Coordinates: 36°02′30″N 58°39′36″E
- Country: Iran
- Province: Razavi Khorasan
- County: Miyan Jolgeh
- District: Central
- Rural District: Eshqabad

Population (2016)
  - Total: 51
- Time zone: UTC+3:30 (IRST)

Hesar Now (Persian: حصارنو) (Note: Also romanized as Ḩeşār Now) is a village in Eshqabad Rural District of the Central District (Note: Formerly Miyan Jolgeh District of Nishapur County) in Miyan Jolgeh County, Razavi Khorasan province, Iran.

== Demographics ==
=== Population ===
At the time of the 2006 National Census, the village's population was 88 in 21 households, when it was in Miyan Jolgeh District (Note: Renamed the Central District of Miyan Jolgeh County) of Nishapur County. The following census in 2011 counted 67 people in 22 households. The 2016 census measured the population of the village as 51 people in 14 households.

In 2023, the district was separated from the county in the establishment of Miyan Jolgeh County and renamed the Central District.
