= Attaiyeh =

Village in Razavi Khorasan province, Iran

Attaiyeh Persian: عطائيه
- Village
- Location within Iran
- Coordinates: 35°43′03″N 58°29′59″E
- Country: Iran
- Province: Razavi Khorasan
- County: Miyan Jolgeh
- District: Central
- Rural District: Eshqabad

Population (2016)
  - Total: 754
- Time zone: UTC+3:30 (IRST)

Attaiyeh (Persian: عطائيه) (Note: Also romanized as ‘Aţţā’īyeh) is a village in Eshqabad Rural District of the Central District (Note: Formerly Miyan Jolgeh District of Nishapur County) in Miyan Jolgeh County, Razavi Khorasan province, Iran.

== Demographics ==
=== Population ===
At the time of the 2006 National Census, the village's population was 801 in 200 households, when it was in Miyan Jolgeh District (Note: Renamed the Central District of Miyan Jolgeh County) of Nishapur County. The following census in 2011 counted 785 people in 226 households. The 2016 census measured the population of the village as 754 people in 222 households.

In 2023, the district was separated from the county in the establishment of Miyan Jolgeh County and renamed the Central District.
