= Mian Band =

Village in Razavi Khorasan province, Iran

Mian Band Persian: ميان بند
- Village
- Location within Iran
- Coordinates: 36°02′09″N 58°45′58″E
- Country: Iran
- Province: Razavi Khorasan
- County: Miyan Jolgeh
- District: Central
- Rural District: Eshqabad

Population (2016)
  - Total: 141
- Time zone: UTC+3:30 (IRST)

Mian Band (Persian: ميان بند) (Note: Also romanized as Mīān Band) is a village in Eshqabad Rural District of the Central District (Note: Formerly Miyan Jolgeh District of Nishapur County) in Miyan Jolgeh County, Razavi Khorasan province, Iran.

== Demographics ==
=== Population ===
At the time of the 2006 National Census, the village's population was 164 in 39 households, when it was in Miyan Jolgeh District (Note: Renamed the Central District of Miyan Jolgeh County) of Nishapur County. The following census in 2011 counted 154 people in 46 households. The 2016 census measured the population of the village as 141 people in 45 households.

In 2023, the district was separated from the county in the establishment of Miyan Jolgeh County and renamed the Central District.
