= Nasrabad-e Olya =

Village in Razavi Khorasan province, Iran

Nasrabad-e Olya Persian: نصرابادعليا
- Village
- Location within Iran
- Country: Iran
- Province: Razavi Khorasan
- County: Miyan Jolgeh
- District: Central
- Rural District: Eshqabad

Population (2016)
  - Total: 34
- Time zone: UTC+3:30 (IRST)

Nasrabad-e Olya (Persian: نصرابادعليا) (Note: Also romanized as Naşrābād-e ‘Olyā; also known as Naşrābād and Naşrābād-e Bālā) is a village in Eshqabad Rural District of the Central District (Note: Formerly Miyan Jolgeh District of Nishapur County) in Miyan Jolgeh County, Razavi Khorasan province, Iran.

== Demographics ==
=== Population ===
At the time of the 2006 National Census, the village's population was 51 in 12 households, when it was in Miyan Jolgeh District (Note: Renamed the Central District of Miyan Jolgeh County) of Nishapur County. The following census in 2011 counted 45 people in 13 households. The 2016 census measured the population of the village as 34 people in nine households.

In 2023, the district was separated from the county in the establishment of Miyan Jolgeh County and renamed the Central District.
