= Golbui =

Golbui (Persian: گلبوي) may refer to:

- Golbui-ye Bala
- Golbui-ye Pain
