= Shur Rud =

Village in Razavi Khorasan province, Iran

Shur Rud Persian: شوررود
- Village
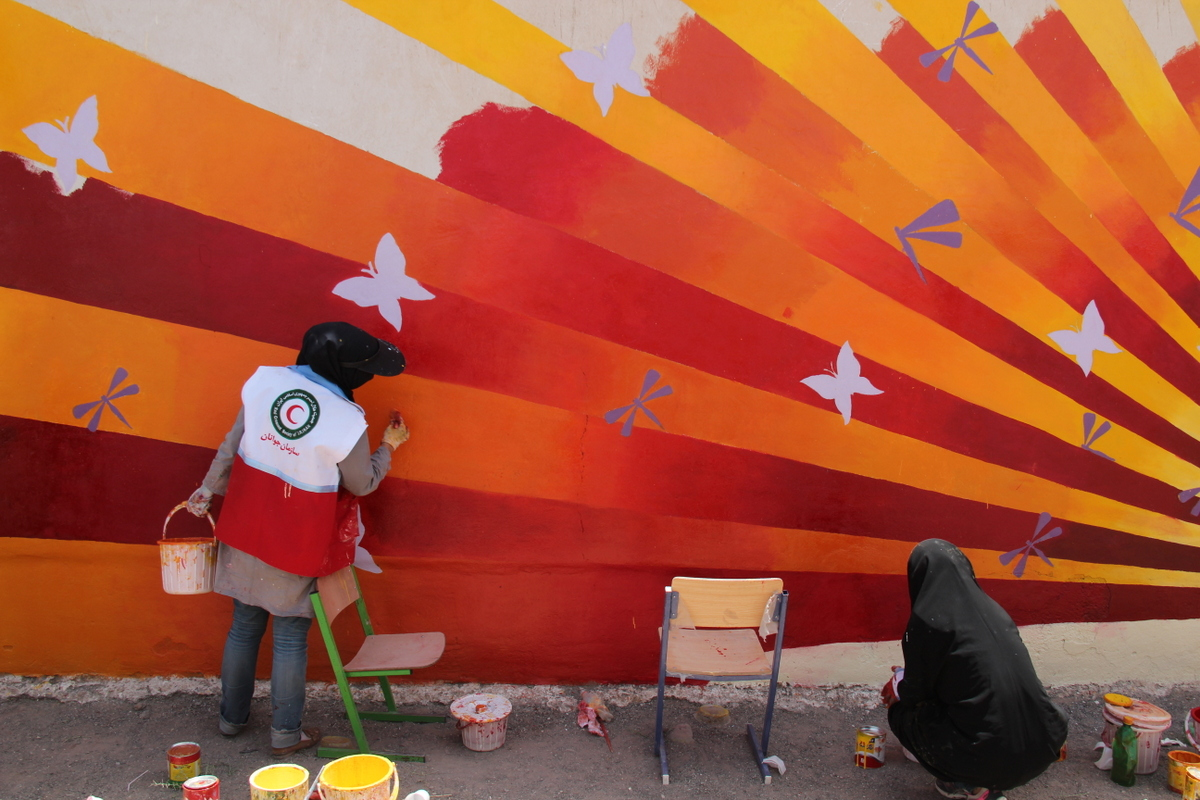
- Members of the Red Crescent painting walls in the village of Shur Rud

- Location within Iran
- Coordinates: 35°42′00″N 58°34′51″E
- Country: Iran
- Province: Razavi Khorasan
- County: Miyan Jolgeh
- District: Central
- Rural District: Eshqabad

Population (2016)
  - Total: 1,114
- Time zone: UTC+3:30 (IRST)

Shur Rud (Persian: شوررود) (Note: Also romanized as Shūr Rūd) is a village in Eshqabad Rural District of the Central District (Note: Formerly Miyan Jolgeh District of Nishapur County) in Miyan Jolgeh County, Razavi Khorasan province, Iran.

== Demographics ==
=== Population ===
At the time of the 2006 National Census, the village's population was 840 in 203 households, when it was in Miyan Jolgeh District (Note: Renamed the Central District of Miyan Jolgeh County) of Nishapur County. The following census in 2011 counted 920 people in 263 households. The 2016 census measured the population of the village as 1,114 people in 336 households.

In 2023, the district was separated from the county in the establishment of Miyan Jolgeh County and renamed the Central District.
