= Bagh Jahan =

Village in Razavi Khorasan province, Iran

Bagh Jahan Persian: باغ جهان
- Village
- Location within Iran
- Coordinates: 36°00′28″N 58°37′05″E
- Country: Iran
- Province: Razavi Khorasan
- County: Miyan Jolgeh
- District: Central
- Rural District: Eshqabad

Population (2016)
  - Total: 320
- Time zone: UTC+3:30 (IRST)

Bagh Jahan (Persian: باغ جهان) (Note: Also romanized as Bāgh Jahān; also known as Bāgh Jān) is a village in Eshqabad Rural District of the Central District (Note: Formerly Miyan Jolgeh District of Nishapur County) in Miyan Jolgeh County, Razavi Khorasan province, Iran.

== Demographics ==
=== Population ===
At the time of the 2006 National Census, the village's population was 281 in 74 households, when it was in Miyan Jolgeh District (Note: Renamed the Central District of Miyan Jolgeh County) of Nishapur County. The following census in 2011 counted 300 people in 84 households. The 2016 census measured the population of the village as 320 people in 96 households.

In 2023, the district was separated from the county in the establishment of Miyan Jolgeh County and renamed the Central District.
