= Hoseynabad-e Jangal, Razavi Khorasan =

Village in Razavi Khorasan province, Iran

Hoseynabad-e Jangal Persian: حسين ابادجنگل
- Village
- Location within Iran
- Coordinates: 36°02′14″N 58°22′58″E
- Country: Iran
- Province: Razavi Khorasan
- County: Miyan Jolgeh
- District: Central
- Rural District: Ghazali

Population (2016)
  - Total: 596
- Time zone: UTC+3:30 (IRST)

Hoseynabad-e Jangal (Persian: حسين ابادجنگل) (Note: Also romanized as Ḩoseynābād-e Jangal; also known as Ḩasanābād) is a village in Ghazali Rural District of the Central District (Note: Formerly Miyan Jolgeh District of Nishapur County) in Miyan Jolgeh County, Razavi Khorasan province, Iran.

== Demographics ==
=== Population ===
At the time of the 2006 National Census, the village's population was 627 in 149 households, when it was in Miyan Jolgeh District (Note: Renamed the Central District of Miyan Jolgeh County) of Nishapur County. The following census in 2011 counted 632 people in 170 households. The 2016 census measured the population of the village as 596 people in 174 households.

In 2023, the district was separated from the county in the establishment of Miyan Jolgeh County and renamed the Central District.
