= Akbarabad, Miyan Jolgeh =

Village in Razavi Khorasan province, Iran

Akbarabad Persian: اكبراباد
- Village
- Location within Iran
- Coordinates: 36°01′17″N 58°38′32″E
- Country: Iran
- Province: Razavi Khorasan
- County: Miyan Jolgeh
- District: Central
- Rural District: Eshqabad

Population (2016)
  - Total: 233
- Time zone: UTC+3:30 (IRST)

Akbarabad (Persian: اكبراباد) (Note: Also romanized as Akbarābād) is a village in Eshqabad Rural District of the Central District (Note: Formerly Miyan Jolgeh District of Nishapur County) in Miyan Jolgeh County, Razavi Khorasan province, Iran.

== Demographics ==
=== Population ===
At the time of the 2006 National Census, the village's population was 225 in 62 households, when it was in Miyan Jolgeh District (Note: Renamed the Central District of Miyan Jolgeh County) of Nishapur County. The following census in 2011 counted 230 people in 71 households. The 2016 census measured the population of the village as 233 people in 73 households.

In 2023, the district was separated from the county in the establishment of Miyan Jolgeh County and renamed the Central District.
