= Nasrabad, Miyan Jolgeh =

Village in Razavi Khorasan province, Iran

Nasrabad Persian: نصراباد
- Village
- Location within Iran
- Coordinates: 36°00′36″N 58°30′20″E
- Country: Iran
- Province: Razavi Khorasan
- County: Miyan Jolgeh
- District: Central
- Rural District: Ghazali

Population (2016)
  - Total: 278
- Time zone: UTC+3:30 (IRST)

Nasrabad (Persian: نصراباد) (Note: Also romanized as Naşrābād; also known as Naşārābād and Naşrābād-e Pā’īn) is a village in Ghazali Rural District of the Central District (Note: Formerly Miyan Jolgeh District of Nishapur County) in Miyan Jolgeh County, Razavi Khorasan province, Iran.

== Demographics ==
=== Population ===
At the time of the 2006 National Census, the village's population was 316 in 84 households, when it was in Miyan Jolgeh District (Note: Renamed the Central District of Miyan Jolgeh County) of Nishapur County. The following census in 2011 counted 290 people in 82 households. The 2016 census measured the population of the village as 278 people in 83 households.

In 2023, the district was separated from the county in the establishment of Miyan Jolgeh County and renamed the Central District.
