= Fadisheh =

Village in Razavi Khorasan province, Iran

Fadisheh Persian: فديشه
- Village
- Location within Iran
- Coordinates: 36°01′33″N 58°26′25″E
- Country: Iran
- Province: Razavi Khorasan
- County: Miyan Jolgeh
- District: Central
- Rural District: Ghazali

Population (2016)
  - Total: 1,382
- Time zone: UTC+3:30 (IRST)

Fadisheh (Persian: فديشه) (Note: Also romanized as Fadīsheh) is a village in, and the capital of, Ghazali Rural District in the Central District (Note: Formerly Miyan Jolgeh District of Nishapur County) of Miyan Jolgeh County, Razavi Khorasan province, Iran.

== Demographics ==
=== Population ===
At the time of the 2006 National Census, the village's population was 1,372 in 368 households, when it was in Miyan Jolgeh District (Note: Renamed the Central District of Miyan Jolgeh County) of Nishapur County. The following census in 2011 counted 1,449 people in 404 households. The 2016 census measured the population of the village as 1,382 people in 427 households.

In 2023, the district was separated from the county in the establishment of Miyan Jolgeh County and renamed the Central District.
