= Shahrabad, Miyan Jolgeh =

Village in Razavi Khorasan province, Iran

Shahrabad Persian: شهراباد
- Village
- Location within Iran
- Coordinates: 36°00′39″N 58°28′43″E
- Country: Iran
- Province: Razavi Khorasan
- County: Miyan Jolgeh
- District: Central
- Rural District: Ghazali

Population (2016)
  - Total: 562
- Time zone: UTC+3:30 (IRST)

Shahrabad (Persian: شهراباد) (Note: Also romanized as Shahrābād) is a village in Ghazali Rural District of the Central District (Note: Formerly Miyan Jolgeh District of Nishapur County) in Miyan Jolgeh County, Razavi Khorasan province, Iran.

== Demographics ==
=== Population ===
At the time of the 2006 National Census, the village's population was 748 in 173 households, when it was in Miyan Jolgeh District (Note: Renamed the Central District of Miyan Jolgeh County) of Nishapur County. The following census in 2011 counted 647 people in 169 households. The 2016 census measured the population of the village as 562 people in 161 households.

In 2023, the district was separated from the county in the establishment of Miyan Jolgeh County and renamed the Central District.
