= Dast Feshad =

Village in Razavi Khorasan province, Iran

Dast Feshad Persian: دست فشاد
- Village
- Location within Iran
- Coordinates: 36°01′39″N 58°28′20″E
- Country: Iran
- Province: Razavi Khorasan
- County: Miyan Jolgeh
- District: Central
- Rural District: Ghazali

Population (2016)
  - Total: 178
- Time zone: UTC+3:30 (IRST)

Dast Feshad (Persian: دست فشاد) (Note: Also romanized as Dast Feshād and Dastfeshād; also known as Dasht Feshād) is a village in Ghazali Rural District of the Central District (Note: Formerly Miyan Jolgeh District of Nishapur County) in Miyan Jolgeh County, Razavi Khorasan province, Iran.

== Demographics ==
=== Population ===
At the time of the 2006 National Census, the village's population was 182 in 47 households, when it was in Miyan Jolgeh District (Note: Renamed the Central District of Miyan Jolgeh County) of Nishapur County. The following census in 2011 counted 164 people in 52 households. The 2016 census measured the population of the village as 178 people in 53 households.

In 2023, the district was separated from the county in the establishment of Miyan Jolgeh County and renamed the Central District.
