= Deh Now-e Shur =

Village in Razavi Khorasan province, Iran

Deh Now-e Shur Persian: دهنوشور
- Village
- Location within Iran
- Coordinates: 36°03′12″N 58°38′03″E
- Country: Iran
- Province: Razavi Khorasan
- County: Miyan Jolgeh
- District: Central
- Rural District: Eshqabad

Population (2016)
  - Total: 121
- Time zone: UTC+3:30 (IRST)

Deh Now-e Shur (Persian: دهنوشور) (Note: Also romanized as Deh Now-e Shūr; also known as Dehnow-e Sarbor) is a village in Eshqabad Rural District of the Central District (Note: Formerly Miyan Jolgeh District of Nishapur County) in Miyan Jolgeh County, Razavi Khorasan province, Iran.

== Demographics ==
=== Population ===
At the time of the 2006 National Census, the village's population was 127 in 35 households, when it was in Miyan Jolgeh District (Note: Renamed the Central District of Miyan Jolgeh County) of Nishapur County. The following census in 2011 counted 112 people in 33 households. The 2016 census measured the population of the village as 121 people in 38 households.

In 2023, the district was separated from the county in the establishment of Miyan Jolgeh County and renamed the Central District.
