= Hoseynabad-e Arab =

Village in Razavi Khorasan province, Iran

Hoseynabad-e Arab Persian: حسين ابادعرب
- Village
- Location within Iran
- Coordinates: 36°00′54″N 58°41′08″E
- Country: Iran
- Province: Razavi Khorasan
- County: Miyan Jolgeh
- District: Central
- Rural District: Eshqabad

Population (2016)
  - Total: 113
- Time zone: UTC+3:30 (IRST)

Hoseynabad-e Arab (Persian: حسين ابادعرب) (Note: Also romanized as Ḩoseynābād-e ʿArab; also known as Ḩoseynābād) is a village in Eshqabad Rural District of the Central District (Note: Formerly Miyan Jolgeh District of Nishapur County) in Miyan Jolgeh County, Razavi Khorasan province, Iran.

== Demographics ==
=== Population ===
At the time of the 2006 National Census, the village's population was 108 in 28 households, when it was in Miyan Jolgeh District (Note: Renamed the Central District of Miyan Jolgeh County) of Nishapur County. The following census in 2011 counted 104 people in 31 households. The 2016 census measured the population of the village as 113 people in 33 households.

In 2023, the district was separated from the county in the establishment of Miyan Jolgeh County and renamed the Central District.
