= Kalateh-ye Hajji Shir Mohammad =

Village in Razavi Khorasan province, Iran

Kalateh-ye Hajji Shir Mohammad Persian: كلاته حاجي شيرمحمد
- Village
- Location within Iran
- Coordinates: 35°56′14″N 58°23′36″E
- Country: Iran
- Province: Razavi Khorasan
- County: Miyan Jolgeh
- District: Central
- Rural District: Ghazali

Population (2016)
  - Total: 16
- Time zone: UTC+3:30 (IRST)

Kalateh-ye Hajji Shir Mohammad (Persian: كلاته حاجي شيرمحمد) (Note: Also romanized as Kalāteh-ye Ḩājjī Shīr Moḩammad; also known as Kalāteh-ye Ḩājj Shīr Moḩammad) is a village in Ghazali Rural District of the Central District (Note: Formerly Miyan Jolgeh District of Nishapur County) in Miyan Jolgeh County, Razavi Khorasan province, Iran.

== Demographics ==
=== Population ===
At the time of the 2006 National Census, the village's population was 22 in five households, when it was in Miyan Jolgeh District (Note: Renamed the Central District of Miyan Jolgeh County) of Nishapur County. The following census in 2011 counted 28 people in seven households. The 2016 census measured the population of the village as 16 people in six households.

In 2023, the district was separated from the county in the establishment of Miyan Jolgeh County and renamed the Central District.
