= Soleymani, Miyan Jolgeh =

Village in Razavi Khorasan province, Iran

Soleymani Persian: سليماني
- Village
- Location within Iran
- Coordinates: 36°02′04″N 58°44′15″E
- Country: Iran
- Province: Razavi Khorasan
- County: Miyan Jolgeh
- District: Central
- Rural District: Eshqabad

Population (2016)
  - Total: 252
- Time zone: UTC+3:30 (IRST)

Soleymani (Persian: سليماني) (Note: Also romanized as Soleymānī; also known as Soleymānīyeh) is a village in Eshqabad Rural District of the Central District (Note: Formerly Miyan Jolgeh District of Nishapur County) in Miyan Jolgeh County, Razavi Khorasan province, Iran.

== Demographics ==
=== Population ===
At the time of the 2006 National Census, the village's population was 251 in 62 households, when it was in Miyan Jolgeh District (Note: Renamed the Central District of Miyan Jolgeh County) of Nishapur County. The following census in 2011 counted 214 people in 63 households. The 2016 census measured the population of the village as 252 people in 77 households.

In 2023, the district was separated from the county in the establishment of Miyan Jolgeh County and renamed the Central District.
