= Chah Nasar =

Village in Razavi Khorasan province, Iran

Chah Nasar Persian: چاه نسر
- Village
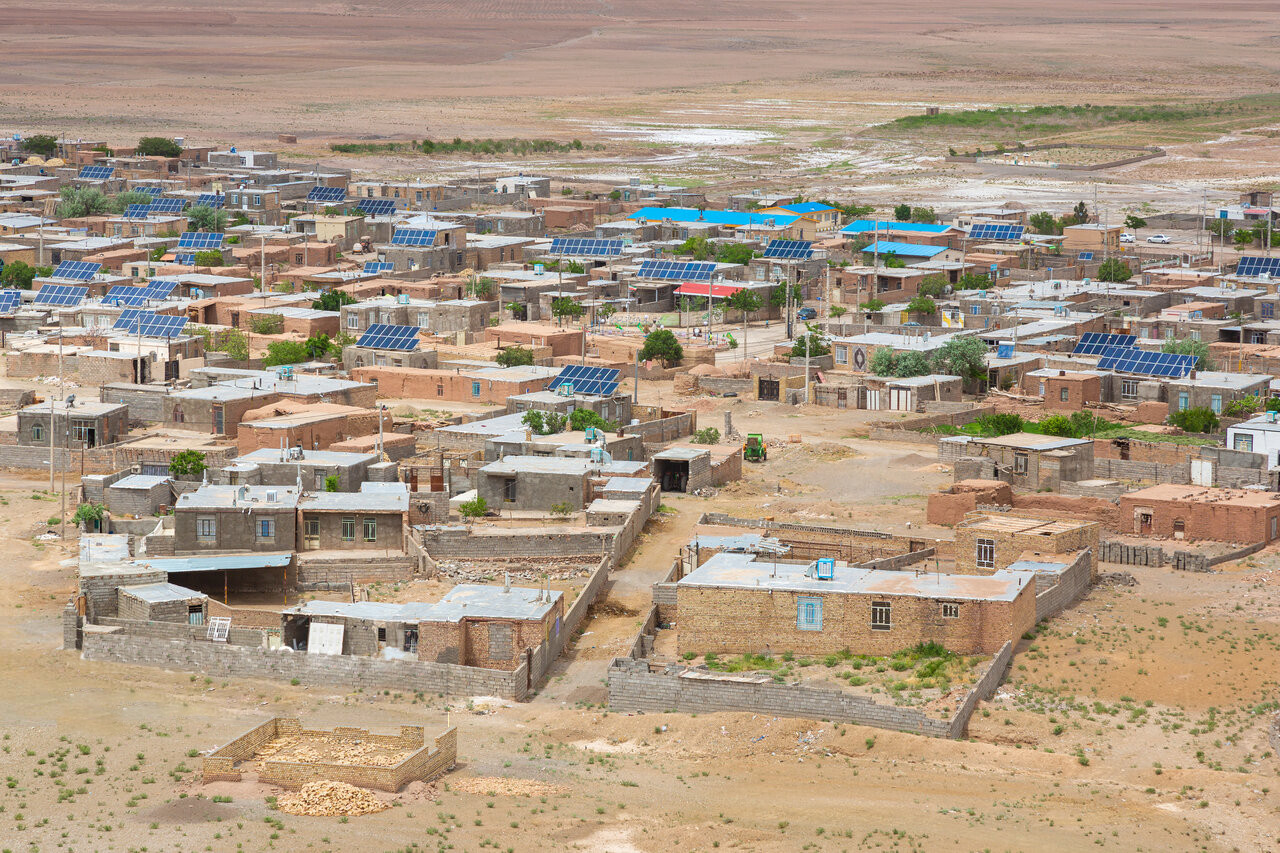
- The village of Chah Nasar

- Location within Iran
- Coordinates: 35°49′33″N 58°31′47″E
- Country: Iran
- Province: Razavi Khorasan
- County: Miyan Jolgeh
- District: Central
- Rural District: Eshqabad

Population (2016)
  - Total: 1,246
- Time zone: UTC+3:30 (IRST)

Chah Nasar (Persian: چاه نسر) (Note: Also romanized as Chāh Nasar) is a village in Eshqabad Rural District of the Central District (Note: Formerly Miyan Jolgeh District of Nishapur County) in Miyan Jolgeh County, Razavi Khorasan province, Iran.

== Demographics ==
=== Population ===
At the time of the 2006 National Census, the village's population was 975 in 241 households, when it was in Miyan Jolgeh District (Note: Renamed the Central District of Miyan Jolgeh County) of Nishapur County. The following census in 2011 counted 1,207 people in 362 households. The 2016 census measured the population of the village as 1,246 people in 388 households.

In 2023, the district was separated from the county in the establishment of Miyan Jolgeh County and renamed the Central District.
