= Zammeh, Razavi Khorasan =

Village in Razavi Khorasan province, Iran

Zammeh Persian: ذمه
- Village
- Location within Iran
- Coordinates: 35°46′35″N 58°45′12″E
- Country: Iran
- Province: Razavi Khorasan
- County: Miyan Jolgeh
- District: Belharat
- Rural District: Belharat

Population (2016)
  - Total: 444
- Time zone: UTC+3:30 (IRST)

Zammeh (Persian: ذمه) (Note: Also romanized as Zameh and Zemeh)) is a village in Belharat Rural District of Belharat District in Miyan Jolgeh County, Razavi Khorasan province, Iran.

== Demographics ==
=== Population ===
At the time of the 2006 National Census, the village's population was 456 in 128 households, when it was in Miyan Jolgeh District (Note: Renamed the Central District of Miyan Jolgeh County) of Nishapur County. The following census in 2011 counted 543 people in 132 households. The 2016 census measured the population of the village as 444 people in 131 households.

In 2023, the district was separated from the county in the establishment of Miyan Jolgeh County and renamed the Central District. The rural district was transferred to the new Belharat District.
