= Sadabad-e Arab =

Village in Razavi Khorasan province, Iran

Sadabad-e Arab Persian: سعدابادعرب
- Village
- Location within Iran
- Coordinates: 36°02′03″N 58°45′10″E
- Country: Iran
- Province: Razavi Khorasan
- County: Miyan Jolgeh
- District: Central
- Rural District: Eshqabad

Population (2016)
  - Total: 70
- Time zone: UTC+3:30 (IRST)

Sadabad-e Arab (Persian: سعدابادعرب) (Note: Also romanized as Sa‘dābād-e ʿArab; also known as Sa‘dābād) is a village in Eshqabad Rural District of the Central District (Note: Formerly Miyan Jolgeh District of Nishapur County) in Miyan Jolgeh County, Razavi Khorasan province, Iran.

== Demographics ==
=== Population ===
At the time of the 2006 National Census, the village's population was 131 in 33 households, when it was in Miyan Jolgeh District (Note: Renamed the Central District of Miyan Jolgeh County) of Nishapur County. The following census in 2011 counted 123 people in 34 households. The 2016 census measured the population of the village as 70 people in 20 households.

In 2023, the district was separated from the county in the establishment of Miyan Jolgeh County and renamed the Central District.
