= Kalateh-ye Bagh =

Village in Razavi Khorasan province, Iran

Kalateh-ye Bagh Persian: كلاته باغ
- Village
- Location within Iran
- Coordinates: 35°57′51″N 58°24′19″E
- Country: Iran
- Province: Razavi Khorasan
- County: Miyan Jolgeh
- District: Central
- Rural District: Ghazali

Population (2016)
  - Total: 61
- Time zone: UTC+3:30 (IRST)

Kalateh-ye Bagh (Persian: كلاته باغ) (Note: Also romanized as Kalāteh-ye Bāgh) is a village in Ghazali Rural District of the Central District (Note: Formerly Miyan Jolgeh District of Nishapur County) in Miyan Jolgeh County, Razavi Khorasan province, Iran.

== Demographics ==
=== Population ===
At the time of the 2006 National Census, the village's population was 70 in 16 households, when it was in Miyan Jolgeh District (Note: Renamed the Central District of Miyan Jolgeh County) of Nishapur County. The following census in 2011 counted 47 people in 14 households. The 2016 census measured the population of the village as 61 people in 19 households.

In 2023, the district was separated from the county in the establishment of Miyan Jolgeh County and renamed the Central District.
