= Raisi, Razavi Khorasan =

Village in Razavi Khorasan province, Iran

Raisi Persian: رئيسی
- Village
- Location within Iran
- Coordinates: 35°59′49″N 58°37′39″E
- Country: Iran
- Province: Razavi Khorasan
- County: Miyan Jolgeh
- District: Central
- Rural District: Eshqabad

Population (2016)
  - Total: 1,031
- Time zone: UTC+3:30 (IRST)

Raisi (Persian: رئيسی) (Note: Also romanized as Ra’īsī; also known as Rīsī) is a village in, and the capital of, Eshqabad Rural District in the Central District (Note: Formerly Miyan Jolgeh District of Nishapur County) of Miyan Jolgeh County, Razavi Khorasan province, Iran. The rural district was previously administered from the city of Eshqabad.

== Demographics ==
=== Population ===
At the time of the 2006 National Census, the village's population was 901 in 222 households, when it was in Miyan Jolgeh District (Note: Renamed the Central District of Miyan Jolgeh County) of Nishapur County. The following census in 2011 counted 940 people in 281 households. The 2016 census measured the population of the village as 1,031 people in 323 households.

In 2023, the district was separated from the county in the establishment of Miyan Jolgeh County and renamed the Central District.
