= Mahmudabad, Miyan Jolgeh =

Village in Razavi Khorasan province, Iran

Mahmudabad Persian: محموداباد
- Village
- Location within Iran
- Coordinates: 36°02′13″N 58°36′13″E
- Country: Iran
- Province: Razavi Khorasan
- County: Miyan Jolgeh
- District: Central
- Rural District: Eshqabad

Population (2016)
  - Total: 337
- Time zone: UTC+3:30 (IRST)

Mahmudabad (Persian: محموداباد) (Note: Also romanized as Maḩmūdābād) is a village in Eshqabad Rural District of the Central District (Note: Formerly Miyan Jolgeh District of Nishapur County) in Miyan Jolgeh County, Razavi Khorasan province, Iran.

== Demographics ==
=== Population ===
At the time of the 2006 National Census, the village's population was 324 in 83 households, when it was in Miyan Jolgeh District (Note: Renamed the Central District of Miyan Jolgeh County) of Nishapur County. The following census in 2011 counted 351 people in 110 households. The 2016 census measured the population of the village as 337 people in 102 households.

In 2023, the district was separated from the county in the establishment of Miyan Jolgeh County and renamed the Central District.
