= Ebrahimabad, Miyan Jolgeh =

Village in Razavi Khorasan province, Iran

Ebrahimabad Persian: ابراهيماباد
- Village
- Location within Iran
- Coordinates: 36°02′04″N 58°39′06″E
- Country: Iran
- Province: Razavi Khorasan
- County: Miyan Jolgeh
- District: Central
- Rural District: Eshqabad

Population (2016)
  - Total: 218
- Time zone: UTC+3:30 (IRST)

Ebrahimabad (Persian: ابراهيماباد) (Note: Also romanized as Ebrāhīmābād) is a village in Eshqabad Rural District of the Central District (Note: Formerly Miyan Jolgeh District of Nishapur County) in Miyan Jolgeh County, Razavi Khorasan province, Iran.

== Demographics ==
=== Population ===
At the time of the 2006 National Census, the village's population was 231 in 52 households, when it was in Miyan Jolgeh District (Note: Renamed the Central District of Miyan Jolgeh County) of Nishapur County. The following census in 2011 counted 237 people in 74 households. The 2016 census measured the population of the village as 218 people in 69 households.

In 2023, the district was separated from the county in the establishment of Miyan Jolgeh County and renamed the Central District.
