= Nowabad, Razavi Khorasan =

Village in Razavi Khorasan province, Iran

Nowabad Persian: نواباد
- Village
- Location within Iran
- Coordinates: 36°04′41″N 58°28′58″E
- Country: Iran
- Province: Razavi Khorasan
- County: Miyan Jolgeh
- District: Central
- Rural District: Ghazali

Population (2016)
  - Total: 256
- Time zone: UTC+3:30 (IRST)

Nowabad (Persian: نواباد) (Note: Also romanized as Nowābād; also known as Naubād) is a village in Ghazali Rural District of the Central District (Note: Formerly Miyan Jolgeh District of Nishapur County) in Miyan Jolgeh County, Razavi Khorasan province, Iran.

== Demographics ==
=== Population ===
At the time of the 2006 National Census, the village's population was 403 in 99 households, when it was in Miyan Jolgeh District (Note: Renamed the Central District of Miyan Jolgeh County) of Nishapur County. The following census in 2011 counted 310 people in 100 households. The 2016 census measured the population of the village as 256 people in 97 households.

In 2023, the district was separated from the county in the establishment of Miyan Jolgeh County and renamed the Central District.
