= Deh-e Hoseyni =

Village in Razavi Khorasan province, Iran

Deh-e Hoseyni Persian: ده حسيني
- Village
- Location within Iran
- Coordinates: 35°55′35″N 58°15′04″E
- Country: Iran
- Province: Razavi Khorasan
- County: Miyan Jolgeh
- District: Central
- Rural District: Ghazali

Population (2016)
  - Total: 792
- Time zone: UTC+3:30 (IRST)

Deh-e Hoseyni (Persian: ده حسيني) (Note: Also romanized as Deh-e Ḩoseynī) is a village in Ghazali Rural District of the Central District (Note: Formerly Miyan Jolgeh District of Nishapur County) in Miyan Jolgeh County, Razavi Khorasan province, Iran.

== Demographics ==
=== Population ===
At the time of the 2006 National Census, the village's population was 663 in 134 households, when it was in Miyan Jolgeh District (Note: Renamed the Central District of Miyan Jolgeh County) of Nishapur County. The following census in 2011 counted 732 people in 185 households. The 2016 census measured the population of the village as 792 people in 191 households.

In 2023, the district was separated from the county in the establishment of Miyan Jolgeh County and renamed the Central District.
