= Hesar Sorkh, Miyan Jolgeh =

Village in Razavi Khorasan province, Iran

Hesar Sorkh Persian: حصارسرخ
- Village
- Location within Iran
- Coordinates: 36°00′51″N 58°18′35″E
- Country: Iran
- Province: Razavi Khorasan
- County: Miyan Jolgeh
- District: Central
- Rural District: Ghazali

Population (2016)
  - Total: 475
- Time zone: UTC+3:30 (IRST)

Hesar Sorkh (Persian: حصارسرخ) (Note: Also romanized as Ḩeşār Sorkh) is a village in Ghazali Rural District of the Central District (Note: Formerly Miyan Jolgeh District of Nishapur County) in Miyan Jolgeh County, Razavi Khorasan province, Iran.

== Demographics ==
=== Population ===
At the time of the 2006 National Census, the village's population was 563 in 140 households, when it was in Miyan Jolgeh District (Note: Renamed the Central District of Miyan Jolgeh County) of Nishapur County. The following census in 2011 counted 531 people in 146 households. The 2016 census measured the population of the village as 475 people in 146 households.

In 2023, the district was separated from the county in the establishment of Miyan Jolgeh County and renamed the Central District.
