= Chehel Morghian =

Village in Razavi Khorasan province, Iran

Chehel Morghian Persian: چهل مرغيان
- Village
- Location within Iran
- Country: Iran
- Province: Razavi Khorasan
- County: Miyan Jolgeh
- District: Central
- Rural District: Eshqabad

Population (2016)
  - Total: 25
- Time zone: UTC+3:30 (IRST)

Chehel Morghian (Persian: چهل مرغيان) (Note: Also romanized as Chehel Morghīān; also known as Chehel Morghān and Mowghīān) is a village in Eshqabad Rural District of the Central District (Note: Formerly Miyan Jolgeh District of Nishapur County) in Miyan Jolgeh County, Razavi Khorasan province, Iran.

== Demographics ==
=== Population ===
At the time of the 2006 National Census, the village's population was 47 in 11 households, when it was in Miyan Jolgeh District (Note: Renamed the Central District of Miyan Jolgeh County) of Nishapur County. The following census in 2011 counted 29 people in 10 households. The 2016 census measured the population of the village as 25 people in 10 households.

In 2023, the district was separated from the county in the establishment of Miyan Jolgeh County and renamed the Central District.
