= Qarah Khan =

Qarah Khan or Qareh Khan (Persian: قره خان) may refer to:

- Qareh Khan-e Sofla, Khuzestan Province
- Qarah Khan, Lorestan
- Qareh Khan, Lorestan
- Qareh Khan, Markazi
- Qarah Khan, Razavi Khorasan
- Qarah Khan, West Azerbaijan
