= Samadiyeh, Razavi Khorasan =

Village in Razavi Khorasan province, Iran

Samadiyeh Persian: صمديه
- Village
- Location within Iran
- Coordinates: 36°01′14″N 58°47′08″E
- Country: Iran
- Province: Razavi Khorasan
- County: Miyan Jolgeh
- District: Central
- Rural District: Eshqabad

Population (2016)
  - Total: 503
- Time zone: UTC+3:30 (IRST)

Samadiyeh (Persian: صمديه) (Note: Also romanized as Şamadīyeh) is a village in Eshqabad Rural District of the Central District (Note: Formerly Miyan Jolgeh District of Nishapur County) in Miyan Jolgeh County, Razavi Khorasan province, Iran.

== Demographics ==
=== Population ===
At the time of the 2006 National Census, the village's population was 503 in 124 households, when it was in Miyan Jolgeh District (Note: Renamed the Central District of Miyan Jolgeh County) of Nishapur County. The following census in 2011 counted 534 people in 155 households. The 2016 census measured the population of the village as 503 people in 162 households.

In 2023, the district was separated from the county in the establishment of Miyan Jolgeh County and renamed the Central District.
