= Baqeriyeh =

Village in Razavi Khorasan province, Iran

Baqeriyeh Persian: باقريه
- Village
- Location within Iran
- Coordinates: 36°00′05″N 58°49′38″E
- Country: Iran
- Province: Razavi Khorasan
- County: Miyan Jolgeh
- District: Central
- Rural District: Eshqabad

Population (2016)
  - Total: 403
- Time zone: UTC+3:30 (IRST)

Baqeriyeh (Persian: باقريه) (Note: Also romanized as Bāqerīyeh) is a village in Eshqabad Rural District of the Central District (Note: Formerly Miyan Jolgeh District of Nishapur County) in Miyan Jolgeh County, Razavi Khorasan province, Iran.

== Demographics ==
=== Population ===
At the time of the 2006 National Census, the village's population was 356 in 89 households, when it was in Miyan Jolgeh District (Note: Renamed the Central District of Miyan Jolgeh County) of Nishapur County. The following census in 2011 counted 376 people in 109 households. The 2016 census measured the population of the village as 403 people in 123 households.

In 2023, the district was separated from the county in the establishment of Miyan Jolgeh County and renamed the Central District.
