= Pa Baz =

Village in Razavi Khorasan province, Iran

Pa Baz Persian: پاباز
- Village
- Location within Iran
- Coordinates: 35°59′18″N 58°19′44″E
- Country: Iran
- Province: Razavi Khorasan
- County: Miyan Jolgeh
- District: Central
- Rural District: Ghazali

Population (2016)
  - Total: 163
- Time zone: UTC+3:30 (IRST)

Pa Baz (Persian: پاباز) (Note: Also romanized as Pā Bāz; also known as Pā Bār and Pā yi Bāz) is a village in Ghazali Rural District of the Central District (Note: Formerly Miyan Jolgeh District of Nishapur County) in Miyan Jolgeh County, Razavi Khorasan province, Iran.

== Demographics ==
=== Population ===
At the time of the 2006 National Census, the village's population was 146 in 33 households, when it was in Miyan Jolgeh District (Note: Renamed the Central District of Miyan Jolgeh County) of Nishapur County. The following census in 2011 counted 136 people in 37 households. The 2016 census measured the population of the village as 163 people in 52 households.

In 2023, the district was separated from the county in the establishment of Miyan Jolgeh County and renamed the Central District.
