= Mazhdabad =

Neighborhood in Razavi Khorasan province, Iran

Mazhdabad Persian: مژداباد
- Neighborhood
- Location within Iran
- Coordinates: 36°02′01″N 58°40′23″E
- Country: Iran
- Province: Razavi Khorasan
- County: Miyan Jolgeh
- District: Central
- City: Eshqabad

Population (2006)
  - Total: 306
- Time zone: UTC+3:30 (IRST)

Mazhdabad (Persian: مژداباد) (Note: Also romanized as Mazhdābād; also known as Mazdābād) is a neighborhood in the city of Eshqabad in the Central District (Note: Formerly Miyan Jolgeh District of Nishapur County) of Miyan Jolgeh County, Razavi Khorasan province, Iran.

== Demographics ==
=== Population ===
At the time of the 2006 National Census, Mazhdabad's population was 306 in 83 households, when it was a village in Eshqabad Rural District of Miyan Jolgeh District (Note: Renamed the Central District of Miyan Jolgeh County) in Nishapur County. After the census, the village was annexed by the city of Eshqabad.

In 2023, the district was separated from the county in the establishment of Miyan Jolgeh County and renamed the Central District.
