= Chah-e Salar =

Village in Razavi Khorasan province, Iran

Chah-e Salar Persian: چاه سالار
- Village
- Location within Iran
- Coordinates: 35°53′47″N 58°21′05″E
- Country: Iran
- Province: Razavi Khorasan
- County: Miyan Jolgeh
- District: Central
- Rural District: Ghazali

Population (2016)
  - Total: 1,509
- Time zone: UTC+3:30 (IRST)

Chah-e Salar (Persian: چاه سالار) is a village in Ghazali Rural District of the Central District (Note: Formerly Miyan Jolgeh District of Nishapur County) in Miyan Jolgeh County, Razavi Khorasan province, Iran.

== Demographics ==
=== Population ===
At the time of the 2006 National Census, the village's population was 1,239 in 287 households, when it was in Miyan Jolgeh District (Note: Renamed the Central District of Miyan Jolgeh County) of Nishapur County. The following census in 2011 counted 1,385 people in 363 households. The 2016 census measured the population of the village as 1,509 people in 429 households, the most populous in its rural district.

In 2023, the district was separated from the county in the establishment of Miyan Jolgeh County and renamed the Central District.
