= Ahmadabad, Miyan Jolgeh =

Village in Razavi Khorasan province, Iran

Ahmadabad Persian: احمداباد
- Village
- Location within Iran
- Coordinates: 36°00′29″N 58°31′14″E
- Country: Iran
- Province: Razavi Khorasan
- County: Miyan Jolgeh
- District: Central
- Rural District: Ghazali

Population (2016)
  - Total: 1,357
- Time zone: UTC+3:30 (IRST)

Ahmadabad (Persian: احمداباد) (Note: Also romanized as Aḩmadābād) is a village in Ghazali Rural District of the Central District (Note: Formerly Miyan Jolgeh District of Nishapur County) in Miyan Jolgeh County, Razavi Khorasan province, Iran.

== Demographics ==
=== Population ===
At the time of the 2006 National Census, the village's population was 1,246 in 342 households, when it was in Miyan Jolgeh District (Note: Renamed the Central District of Miyan Jolgeh County) of Nishapur County. The following census in 2011 counted 1,391 people in 438 households. The 2016 census measured the population of the village as 1,357 people in 428 households.

In 2023, the district was separated from the county in the establishment of Miyan Jolgeh County and renamed the Central District.
