= Rigi (disambiguation) =

Rigi is a mountain in Switzerland. Rigi (Persian: ريگي) may also refer to:

== Places ==
- Rigi, Miyan Jolgeh, Razavi Khorasan Province, Iran
- Rigi, Nishapur, Razavi Khorasan Province, Iran

== People ==
- Abdolhamid Rigi (c. 1979–2010), Iranian Baloch militant and member of Jundallah
- Abdolmalek Rigi (c. 1979–2010), Iranian Baloch militant and leader of Jundallah
- Abdulwahid Rigi (died 2022), Iranian Sunni Muslim cleric and murder victim
- Ghulam Mohammad Rigi (born 1947), Afghan politician
- Masoud Rigi (born 1991), Iranian footballer
- Rigivan "Rigi" Ganeshamoorthy (born 1999), Italian para-athlete, Paralympic medallist and world record holder

== Other uses ==
- Rigi (software)
- Rigi Railways, Swiss railway company
- The Rigi, an 1842 series of the three paintings of the Swiss mountain by J. M. W. Turner
- RIG-I protein encoded by the gene RIGI

== See also ==
- Riggi
- Righi (disambiguation)
