= Golbui-ye Pain =

Village in Razavi Khorasan province, Iran

Golbui-ye Pain Persian: گلبوي پائين
- Village
- Location within Iran
- Coordinates: 35°46′59″N 58°51′35″E
- Country: Iran
- Province: Razavi Khorasan
- County: Miyan Jolgeh
- District: Belharat
- Rural District: Salari

Population (2016)
  - Total: 1,136
- Time zone: UTC+3:30 (IRST)

Golbui-ye Pain (Persian: گلبوي پائين) (Note: Also romanized as Golbūī-ye Pā’īn; also known as Golbū-ye Pā’īn) is a village in Salari Rural District of Belharat District in Miyan Jolgeh County, Razavi Khorasan province, Iran, serving as capital of the district. It was the capital of Belharat Rural District until its capital was transferred to the village of Rigi.

== Demographics ==
=== Population ===
At the time of the 2006 National Census, the village's population was 1,015 in 287 households, when it was in Belharat Rural District of the former Miyan Jolgeh District (Note: Renamed the Central District of Miyan Jolgeh County) in Nishapur County. The following census in 2011 counted 1,143 people in 321 households. The 2016 census measured the population of the village as 1,136 people in 345 households.

In 2023, the district was separated from the county in the establishment of Miyan Jolgeh County and renamed the Central District. The rural district was transferred to the new Belharat District, and Golbui-ye Pain was transferred to Salari Rural District created in the same district.
