= Qasemi =

Qasemi may refer to:

- Qasemi, Nishapur, village in Razavi Khorasan Province, Iran
- Qasemi, Sabzevar, village in Razavi Khorasan Province, Iran
- Qasemi, South Khorasan, village in South Khorasan Province, Iran
- Al-Qasemi Academic College of Education, academic college in Baqa al-Gharbiyye in the Haifa District in Israel
- Mirza Qasemi, Northern Iranian appetizer of roasted aubergine distinct to the Caspian Sea region
- Shamsuddin Qasemi (1935–1996), Bangladeshi Islamic scholar and politician
