= Nishapur train disaster =

2004 derailment and explosion of a freight train in Khayyam, Iran

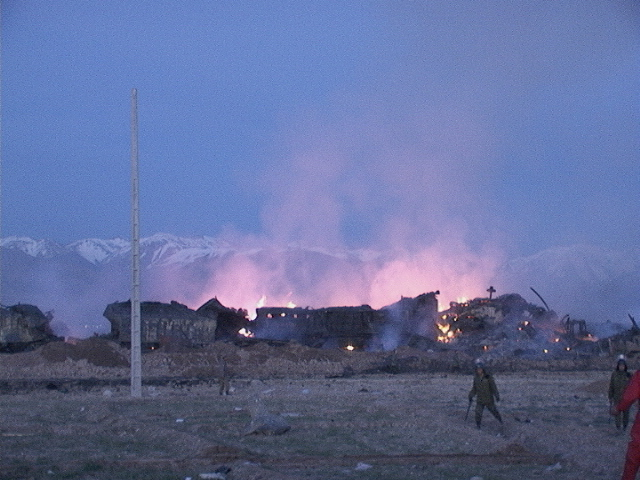
- Khayyam burning after the explosion

Details
- Date: 18 February 2004
- Location: Khayyam
- Coordinates: 36.0987°N 58.9715°E
- Country: Iran
- Incident type: Derailment
- Cause: Runaway rail cars

Statistics
- Deaths: 295
- Injured: 460

The Neishapur train disaster was a large explosion in the village of Khayyam near Nishapur in Iran, on 18 February 2004. Nearly 300 people were killed and the entire village was destroyed when runaway train wagons crashed into the community in the early morning (around 4 a.m.) and exploded a few hours later (around 9:30 a.m.), resulting in Iran's deadliest rail disaster. It is still unexplained how the parked train had come loose and was able to travel such a long distance with no driver or guard.

== Beginning of incident ==
The incident began in the city of Nishapur, where 51 railway wagons carrying sulfur, fertilizer (ammonium nitrate, NH_{4}NO_{3}: the main reason for the Neyshabur Train disaster), petrol and cotton wool broke loose from their siding at Abu Muslim Station, and rolled down the track for about 20 kilometres (12 mi) until they derailed and rolled down an embankment into the town of Khayyam. There was nobody staffing the wagons, or on board at the time of the crash. Local rescue services from neighboring towns arrived to rescue anybody who might have been trapped inside, and to extinguish minor fires which had broken out in the wreckage.

== Chemical leak ==
The substances in the wagons were all highly explosive or flammable (although the Iranian railway authority had not classed any of them as "dangerous" before the incident), and had leaked following the crash. As the small fires spread, a large crowd of local people, including several local politicians and senior railway officials, gathered to watch the emergency operation.

== Explosion ==
During the cleanup operation, the cargo of the wagons exploded – the explosion reportedly being equivalent to 180 tons of TNT – demolishing Khayyam, badly damaging the nearby towns of Eyshabad, Dehnow and Taqiabad, and being felt in the city of Mashhad, 70 kilometres (43 mi) away. The entire village was destroyed, and all of the local emergency services and government personnel were killed or seriously injured in the blast. The wreckage of the train and village continued to burn and explode for several days, despite the cold weather.

== Death toll ==
State authorities identified 295 confirmed killed and over 460 injured, including 182 rescue workers and state officials.

== Islamic Revolutionary Guard Corps ==
Following the blast, troops from the Islamic Revolutionary Guard Corps were called in and were able to maintain security, whilst hundreds of rescue workers were brought in to help with the injured, the trapped, the missing and the dead. Five villages were described as "destroyed".

== Cause ==
Initial reports that "earth tremors" started the wagons rolling have since been discredited, and investigation has so far failed to discover how exactly the wagons were able to travel from Nishapur to Khayyam on their own, why so many highly flammable cargoes were stored and transported together, and why the details of the crash were not discovered sooner, perhaps in time to arrange an evacuation. A statement from the Iranian Transport Minister Ahmad Khorram shortly after the incident reported that natural causes could not have caused the disaster, and that an investigation was underway to determine whether it was incompetence or malice by railway staff that allowed the wagons to come loose from where they were parked.

== See also ==
- Lac-Mégantic derailment - a 2013 derailment of fuel train and subsequent fire and explosions in the core of a Canadian town, also caused by railcars parked on an incline becoming loose.
- Viareggio train derailment - a 2009 derailment of a fuel train in Viareggio, central Italy that caused explosions and fire which killed 32 people.
- Soham rail disaster - a 1944 fire and subsequent explosion of an ammunition train near Soham, England.
