= Righi =

Righi may refer to:

== People ==
Righi is an Italian surname. Notable people with the surname include:

- Aldo Righi (born 1947), Italian pole vaulter
- Andrea Righi (born 1979), Italian freestyle swimmer
- Augusto Righi (1850–1920), Italian physicist
- Daniele Righi (born 1976), Italian cyclist
- Egano Righi-Lambertini (1906-2000), Italian Roman Catholic titular archbishop of Doclea and Vatican diplomat
- Edoardo Righi (1926–2019), Italian athlete
- Esteban Righi (1938–2019), Argentine lawyer and politician
- Italo Righi (born 1959), Captain Regent of San Marino, from April 1, 2012 to October 1, 2012, with Maurizio Rattini
- John Righi (1469–1539), Franciscan hermit
- Ruth Righi (born 2005), American actress and singer
- Stefano Righi (born 1960), Italian singer, songwriter, musician, record producer and actor
- Tommaso Righi (1727–1802), Italian sculptor and stuccator with a practice in Rome
- Vinícius Lopes Righi (born 1964), former Brazilian football player
- Vittore Ugo Righi (1919–1980), Vatican diplomat and author

== Other uses ==
- Righi, Genoa, a hill in the Italian city of Genoa
- Zecca–Righi funicular, a funicular railway connecting Genoa to the Largo della Zecca
- Righi-Leduc effect, the heat flow resulting from a perpendicular temperature gradient and vice versa
- 16766 Righi, a main-belt asteroid
- The Greek name for Reggio Calabria, Italy

== See also ==
- Riggi
- Rigi (disambiguation)
