= Mazdabad =

Mazdabad (Persian: مزداباد) may refer to:

- Mazdabad, Isfahan
- Mazdabad, Razavi Khorasan
