= Qarah Khan, Razavi Khorasan =

Village in Razavi Khorasan province, Iran

Qarah Khan Persian: قره خان
- Village
- Location within Iran
- Coordinates: 36°01′39″N 58°43′09″E
- Country: Iran
- Province: Razavi Khorasan
- County: Miyan Jolgeh
- District: Central
- Rural District: Eshqabad

Population (2016)
  - Total: 197
- Time zone: UTC+3:30 (IRST)

Qarah Khan (Persian: قره خان) (Note: Also romanized as Qarah Khān and Qareh Khān) is a village in Eshqabad Rural District of the Central District (Note: Formerly Miyan Jolgeh District of Nishapur County) in Miyan Jolgeh County, Razavi Khorasan province, Iran.

== Demographics ==
=== Population ===
At the time of the 2006 National Census, the village's population was 195 in 44 households, when it was in Miyan Jolgeh District (Note: Renamed the Central District of Miyan Jolgeh County) of Nishapur County. The following census in 2011 counted 183 people in 50 households. The 2016 census measured the population of the village as 197 people in 56 households.

In 2023, the district was separated from the county in the establishment of Miyan Jolgeh County and renamed the Central District.
