= Jondab =

Jondab or Jandab (Persian: جنداب) may refer to:

- Jondab, Qom
- Jandab, Razavi Khorasan
