= Riggi =

Riggi is a surname. Notable people with the surname include:

- Alessandro Riggi (born 1993), Canadian soccer player
- Chris Riggi (born 1985), American actor
- Giovanni Riggi (1925–2015), American mobster
- John Riggi, American television writer, producer, director and actor

== See also ==
- Rigivan "Riggi" Ganeshamoorthy (born 1999), Italian para-athlete, Paralympic medallist and world record holder
- Rigi (disambiguation)
- Righi (disambiguation)
