= Ghazali Rural District =

Rural district in Razavi Khorasan province, Iran

Ghazali Rural District Persian: دهستان غزالي
- Rural District
- Location within Iran
- Coordinates: 36°00′N 58°24′E
- Country: Iran
- Province: Razavi Khorasan
- County: Miyan Jolgeh
- District: Central
- Established: 1987
- Capital: Fadisheh

Population (2016)
  - Total: 8,951
- Time zone: UTC+3:30 (IRST)

Ghazali Rural District (Persian: دهستان غزالي) is in the Central District (Note: Formerly Miyan Jolgeh District of Nishapur County) of Miyan Jolgeh County, Razavi Khorasan province, Iran. Its capital is the village of Fadisheh.

== Demographics ==
=== Population ===
At the time of the 2006 National Census, the rural district's population (as a part of Miyan Jolgeh District (Note: Renamed the Central District of Miyan Jolgeh County) in Nishapur County) was 8,835 in 2,180 households. There were 8,988 inhabitants in 2,518 households at the following census of 2011. The 2016 census measured the population of the rural district as 8,951 in 2,668 households. The most populous of its 70 villages was Chah-e Salar, with 1,509 people.

In 2023, the district was separated from the county in the establishment of Miyan Jolgeh County and renamed the Central District.

=== Other villages in the rural district ===
- Ahmadabad
- Chah-e Yabu
- Dast Feshad
- Deh-e Hoseyni
- Gol Qandasht
- Hesar Sorkh
- Hoseynabad-e Jangal
- Kalateh-ye Bagh
- Kalateh-ye Hajji Shir Mohammad
- Nasrabad
- Nowabad
- Pa Baz
- Rizab
- Shahrabad
