= Eyshabad, Nishapur =

Eyshabad عيش اباد
- village
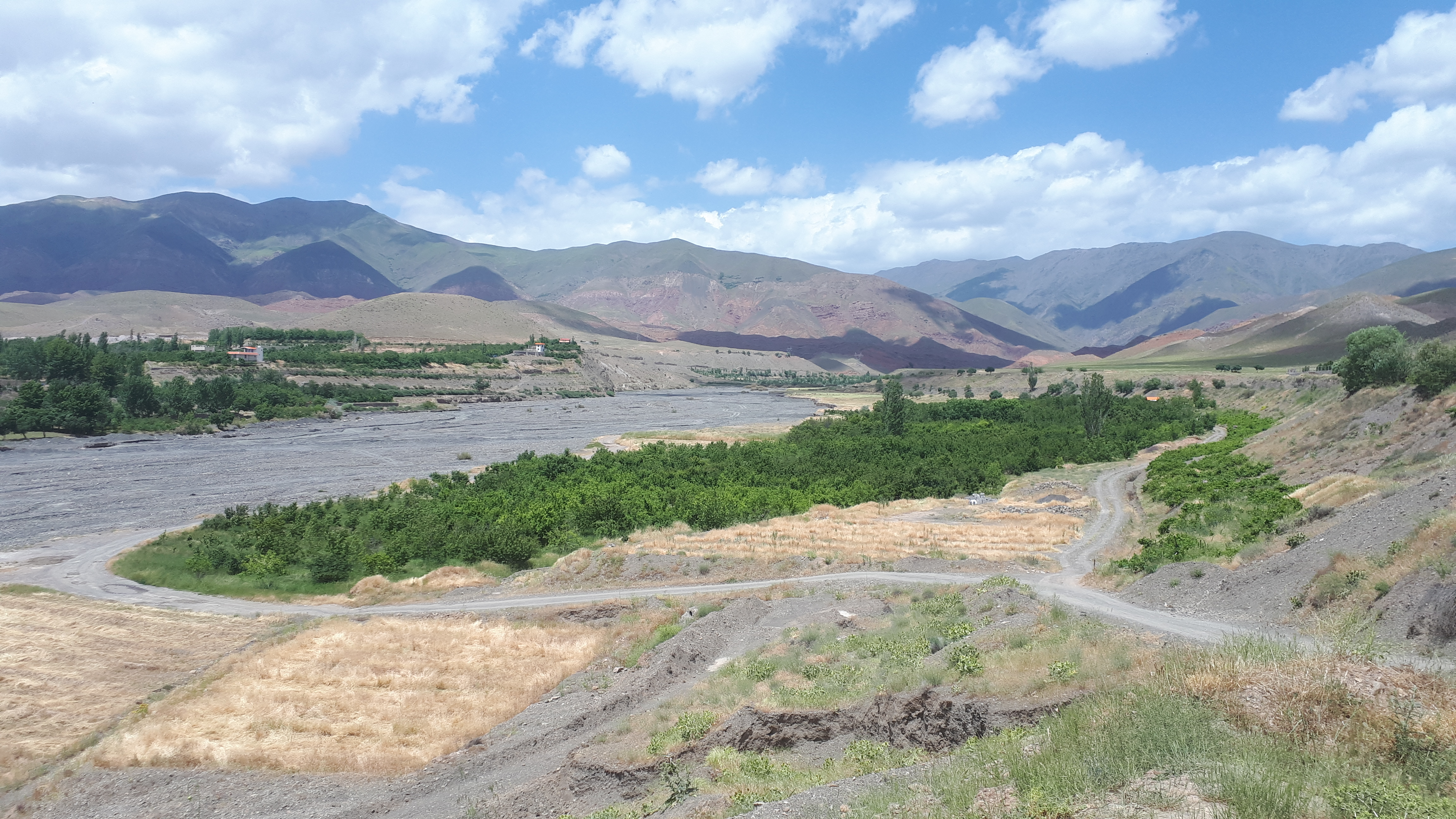

- Location within Iran
- Coordinates: 36°18′08″N 58°49′52″E
- Country: Iran
- Province: Razavi Khorasan
- County: Nishapur
- Bakhsh: Central
- Rural District: Mazul

Population (2006)
  - Total: 158
- Time zone: UTC+3:30 (IRST)
  - Summer (DST): UTC+4:30 (IRDT)

Eyshabad (Persian: عيش اباد, also Romanized as ‘Eyshābād; also known as ‘Eshqābād) is a village in Mazul Rural District, in the Central District of Nishapur County, Razavi Khorasan Province, Iran. At the 2006 census, its population was 158, in 37 families.

Eyshabad was among five villages that suffered severe damage in the 2004 Nishapur train disaster.
