= Eshqabad Rural District (Miyan Jolgeh County) =

Rural district in Razavi Khorasan province, Iran

Eshqabad Rural District Persian: دهستان عشق آباد
- Rural District
- Location within Iran
- Coordinates: 35°53′N 58°40′E
- Country: Iran
- Province: Razavi Khorasan
- County: Miyan Jolgeh
- District: Central
- Established: 1987
- Capital: Raisi

Population (2016)
  - Total: 16,270
- Time zone: UTC+3:30 (IRST)

Eshqabad Rural District (Persian: دهستان عشق آباد) is in the Central District (Note: Formerly Miyan Jolgeh District of Nishapur County) of Miyan Jolgeh County, Razavi Khorasan province, Iran. Its capital is the village of Raisi. The rural district was previously administered from the city of Eshqabad.

== Demographics ==
=== Population ===
At the time of the 2006 National Census, the rural district's population (as a part of Miyan Jolgeh District (Note: Renamed the Central District of Miyan Jolgeh County) in Nishapur County) was 15,280 in 3,852 households. There were 15,711 inhabitants in 4,524 households at the following census of 2011. The 2016 census measured the population of the rural district as 16,270 in 4,934 households. The most populous of its 123 villages was Ardameh, with 2,421 people.

In 2023, the district was separated from the county in the establishment of Miyan Jolgeh County and renamed the Central District.

=== Other villages in the rural district ===
- Akbarabad
- Aliabad
- Amirabad
- Arghesh
- Attaiyeh
- Bagh Jahan
- Baqeriyeh
- Chah Nasar
- Chehel Morghian
- Deh Now-e Shur
- Derakht-e Senjed
- Ebrahimabad
- Fathabad
- Golshan
- Hajjiabad
- Hesar Now
- Hoseynabad-e Arab
- Kalateh-ye Hasanabad
- Kheyrabad
- Kushk
- Kushkak
- Mahmudabad
- Marus
- Mian Band
- Naimabad
- Nasrabad-e Olya
- Pir Gaz
- Qarah Khan
- Qasemabad
- Qasemi
- Sadabad-e Arab
- Samadiyeh
- Shahrak-e Emam
- Shur Rud
- Soleymani
- Taqiabad

== See also ==
- Mazhdabad, a former village and now a neighborhood in the city of Eshqabad
