= Zemeh, West Azerbaijan =

Zemeh ذمه
- Village
- Location within Iran
- Coordinates: 37°03′08″N 45°03′25″E
- Country: Iran
- Province: West Azerbaijan
- County: Oshnavieh
- Bakhsh: Central
- Rural District: Oshnavieh-ye Shomali

Population (2006)
  - Total: 335
- Time zone: UTC+3:30 (IRST)
  - Summer (DST): UTC+4:30 (IRDT)

Zemeh (Persian: ذمه, also Romanized as Z̄emeh) is a village in Oshnavieh-ye Shomali Rural District, in the Central District of Oshnavieh County, West Azerbaijan Province, Iran. At the 2006 census, its population was 335, in 52 families.
