= Salari Rural District =

Rural district in Razavi Khorasan province, Iran

Salari Rural District Persian: دهستان سالاری
- Rural District
- Location within Iran
- Coordinates: 35°50′N 58°54′E
- Country: Iran
- Province: Razavi Khorasan
- County: Miyan Jolgeh
- District: Belharat
- Established: 2023
- Capital: Salari
- Time zone: UTC+3:30 (IRST)

Salari Rural District (Persian: دهستان سالاری) is in Belharat District of Miyan Jolgeh County, Razavi Khorasan province, Iran. Its capital is the village of Salari, whose population at the time of the 2016 National Census was 978 in 297 households.

== History ==
In 2023, Miyan Jolgeh District (Note: Renamed the Central District of Miyan Jolgeh County) was separated from Nishapur County in the establishment of Miyan Jolgeh County and renamed the Central District. Salari Rural District was created in the new Belharat District.

== Other villages in the rural district ==
- Abdolabad
- Anbarkeh
- Dehnow
- Eshratabad
- Eslamabad
- Golbui-ye Bala
- Golbui-ye Pain
- Hasanabad-e Belher
- Homai
- Hoseynabad
- Mehdiabad
- Moskabad
- Qaleh Shisheh
- Qush Aghel
- Shahr-e Kohneh
