= Qareh Khan-e Sofla =

Qareh Khan-e Sofla قره خان سفلي
- Village
- Location within Iran
- Coordinates: 30°46′38″N 48°49′26″E
- Country: Iran
- Province: Khuzestan
- County: Shadegan
- Bakhsh: Central
- Rural District: Buzi

Population (2006)
  - Total: 24
- Time zone: UTC+3:30 (IRST)
  - Summer (DST): UTC+4:30 (IRDT)

Qareh Khan-e Sofla (Persian: قره خان سفلي, also Romanized as Qareh Khān-e Soflá; also known as Qareh Khān-e Pā’īn) is a village in Buzi Rural District, in the Central District of Shadegan County, Khuzestan Province, Iran. At the 2006 census, its population was 24, in 5 families.
