= John Righi =

Italian Roman Catholic priest

Blessed Giovanni Battista Righi O.F.M.

Priest
- Born: 1469; Fabriano, Papal States
- Died: 11 March 1539 (aged 70); Cupramontana, Papal States
- Venerated in: Roman Catholic Church
- Beatified: 7 September 1903, Saint Peter's Basilica, Kingdom of Italy by Pope Pius X
- Feast: 11 March
- Attributes: Franciscan habit

Giovanni Battista Righi (1469 – 11 March 1539) was an Italian Roman Catholic priest and a professed member from the Order of Friars Minor. He was known for ascetic life and for his preaching and healing abilities.

The beatification received confirmation from Pope Pius X on 7 September 1903 after the pontiff issued a decree that ratified the local and popular "cultus" for the late Franciscan priest.

== Life ==
Giovanni Battista Righi was born in Fabriano around 1470 to a noble family. He became a member of the Order of Friars Minor in Forano in 1484 where he later made his solemn profession and was ordained as a priest. He lived as a hermit Cupramontana from 1511 until his death and he preached and tended to the ill there from his hermitage. People flocked to hear him speak and his example led to others repenting from their sins and some even converting back to the faith.

Righi died on 11 March 1539 and his remains were later transferred to an altar at the church of San Giacomo della Romita.

=== Beatification ===
Pope Pius X confirmed the late hermit's beatification on 7 September 1903 after the pope confirmed Righi's longstanding and popular "cultus" - otherwise known as popular devotion to the late priest.
