= Eshqabad, Razavi Khorasan =

City in Razavi Khorasan Province, Iran

Eshqabad Persian: عشق آباد
- City
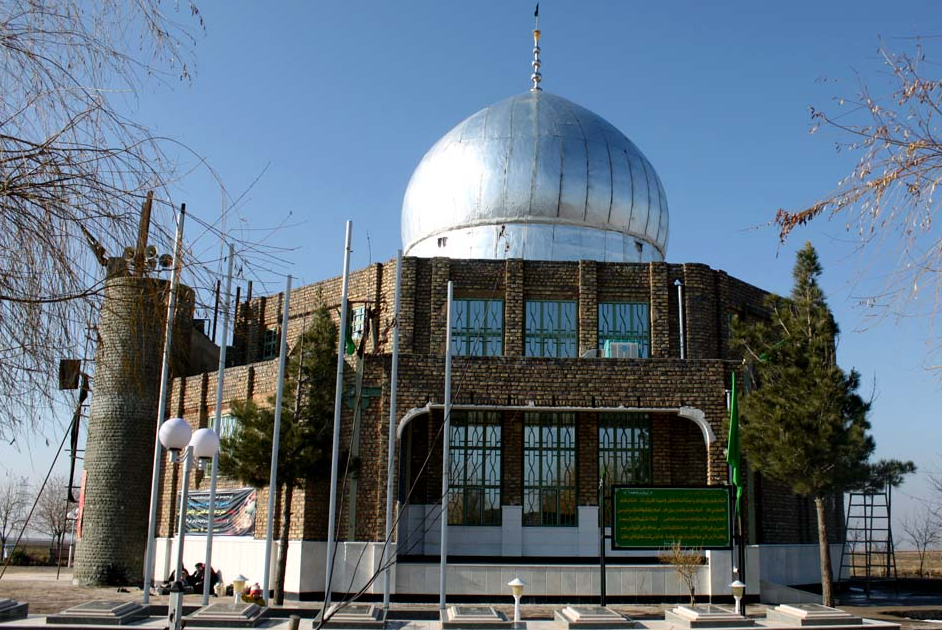
- Emamzadeh-ye Hamza in Eshqabad, Miyan Jolgeh County

- Location within Iran
- Coordinates: 36°02′29″N 58°40′55″E
- Country: Iran
- Province: Razavi Khorasan
- County: Miyan Jolgeh
- District: Central

Population (2016)
  - Total: 1,993
- Time zone: UTC+3:30 (IRST)

Eshqabad (Persian: عشق آباد) (Note: Also romanized as ‘Eshqābād and ‘Ishqābād) is a city in the Central District (Note: Formerly Miyan Jolgeh District of Nishapur County) of Miyan Jolgeh County, Razavi Khorasan Province, Iran, serving as capital of both the county and the district. It was the administrative center for Eshqabad Rural District until its capital was transferred to the village of Raisi.

== Demographics ==
=== Population ===
At the time of the 2006 National Census, the city's population was 1,325 in 348 households, when it was in Miyan Jolgeh District (Note: Renamed the Central District of Miyan Jolgeh County) of Nishapur County. The following census in 2011 counted 1,883 people in 504 households. The 2016 census measured the population of the city as 1,993 people in 592 households.

In 2023, the district was separated from the county in the establishment of Miyan Jolgeh County and renamed the Central District, with Eshqabad as the new county's capital.
