= Belharat Rural District =

Rural district in Razavi Khorasan province, Iran

Belharat Rural District Persian: دهستان بلهرات
- Rural District
- Location within Iran
- Coordinates: 35°44′N 58°42′E
- Country: Iran
- Province: Razavi Khorasan
- County: Miyan Jolgeh
- District: Belharat
- Established: 1987
- Capital: Rigi

Population (2016)
  - Total: 12,074
- Time zone: UTC+3:30 (IRST)

Belharat Rural District (Persian: دهستان بلهرات) is in Belharat District of Miyan Jolgeh County, Razavi Khorasan province, Iran. Its capital is the village of Rigi. The previous capital of the rural district was the village of Golbui-ye Pain, now in Salari Rural District.

== Demographics ==
=== Population ===
At the time of the 2006 National Census, the rural district's population (as a part of Miyan Jolgeh District (Note: Renamed the Central District of Miyan Jolgeh County) in Nishapur County) was 11,677 in 3,037 households. There were 11,896 inhabitants in 3,576 households at the following census of 2011. The 2016 census measured the population of the rural district as 12,074 in 3,756 households. The most populous of its 59 villages was Rigi, with 1,658 people.

In 2023, the district was separated from the county in the establishment of Miyan Jolgeh County and renamed the Central District. Belharat Rural District was transferred to the new Belharat District.

=== Other villages in the rural district ===
- Astayesh
- Bezq
- Jandab
- Zammeh
