= Belharat District =

District in Razavi Khorasan province, Iran

Belharat District Persian: بخش بلهرات
- District
- Location within Iran
- Coordinates: 35°45′N 58°47′E
- Country: Iran
- Province: Razavi Khorasan
- County: Miyan Jolgeh
- Established: 2023
- Capital: Golbui-ye Pain
- Time zone: UTC+3:30 (IRST)

Belharat District (Persian: بخش بلهرات) is in Miyan Jolgeh County, Razavi Khorasan province, Iran. Its capital is the village of Golbui-ye Pain, whose population at the time of the 2016 National Census was 1,143 in 321 households.

== History ==
In 2023, Miyan Jolgeh District (Note: Renamed the Central District of Miyan Jolgeh County) was separated from Nishapur County in the establishment of Miyan Jolgeh County and renamed the Central District. The new county was divided into two districts of two rural districts each, with Eshqabad as its capital and only city at the time.

== Demographics ==
=== Administrative divisions ===
Belharat District
Administrative Divisions
Belharat RD
Salari RD
RD = Rural District
