= Miyan Jolgeh County =

County in Razavi Khorasan Province, Iran

Miyan Jolgeh County Persian: شهرستان میان‌جلگه
- County
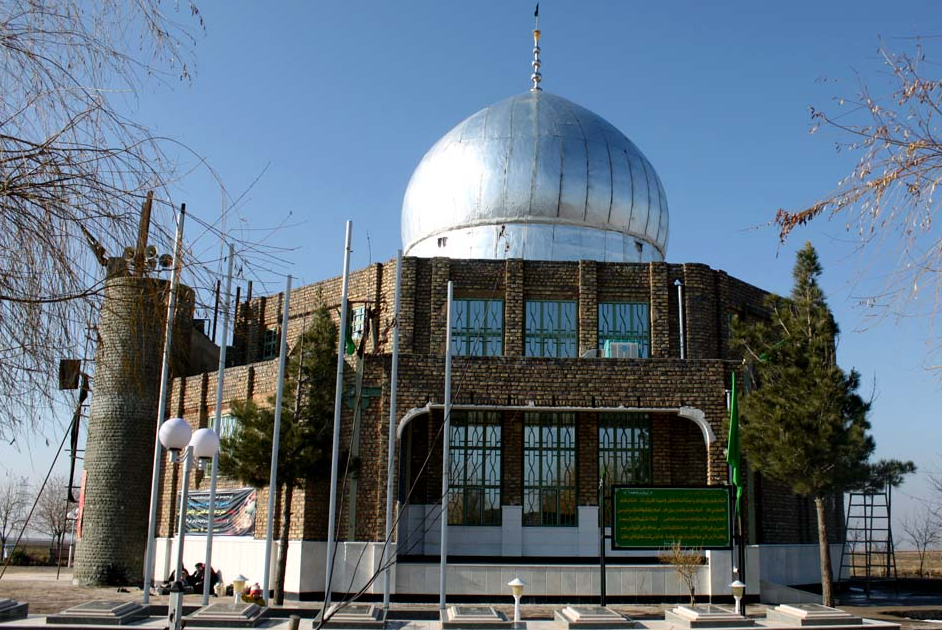
- Eshqabad

- Location of Miyan Jolgeh County in Razavi Khorasan province (center left, green)

- Location of Razavi Khorasan province in Iran
- Coordinates: 35°52′N 58°37′E
- Country: Iran
- Province: Razavi Khorasan
- Established: 2023
- Capital: Eshqabad
- Districts: Central, Belharat
- Time zone: UTC+3:30 (IRST)

Miyan Jolgeh County (Persian: شهرستان میان‌جلگه) is in Razavi Khorasan province, Iran. Its capital is the city of Eshqabad, whose population at the time of the 2016 National Census was 1,993 in 592 households.

== History ==
In 2023, Miyan Jolgeh District (Note: Renamed the Central District of Miyan Jolgeh County) was separated from Nishapur County in the establishment of Miyan Jolgeh County and renamed the Central District. The new county was divided into two districts of two rural districts each, with Eshqabad as its capital and only city at the time.

== Demographics ==
=== Administrative divisions ===
Miyan Jolgeh County's administrative structure is shown in the following table.

Miyan Jolgeh County
Administrative Divisions
Central District (Note: Formerly Miyan Jolgeh District of Nishapur County)
Eshqabad RD
Ghazali RD
Eshqabad (city)
Belharat District
Belharat RD
Salari RD
RD = Rural District

== See also ==
Media related to Miyan Jolgeh County at Wikimedia Commons
