= Central District (Miyan Jolgeh County) =

District in Razavi Khorasan province, Iran

Central District (Miyan Jolgeh County) Persian: بخش مرکزی شهرستان میان‌جلگه
- District
- Location within Iran
- Coordinates: 35°55′N 58°33′E
- Country: Iran
- Province: Razavi Khorasan
- County: Miyan Jolgeh
- Capital: Eshqabad

Population (2016)
  - Total: 39,288 (Note: As Miyan Jolgeh District of Nishapur County)
- Time zone: UTC+3:30 (IRST)

The Central District of Miyan Jolgeh County (Persian: بخش مرکزی شهرستان میان‌جلگه) (Note: Formerly Miyan Jolgeh District (بخش میان‌جلگه) of Nishapur County) is in Razavi Khorasan province, Iran. Its capital is the city of Eshqabad.

== History ==
In 2023, Miyan Jolgeh District (Note: Renamed the Central District of Miyan Jolgeh County) was separated from Nishapur County in the establishment of Miyan Jolgeh County and renamed the Central District. The new county was divided into two districts of two rural districts each, with Eshqabad as its capital and only city at the time. Belharat Rural District was transferred to the new Belharat District.

== Demographics ==
=== Population ===
At the time of the 2006 census, the district's population (as Miyan Jolgeh District of Nishapur County) was 37,117 in 9,417 households. The following census in 2011 counted 38,478 people in 11,122 households. The 2016 census measured the population of the district as 39,288 inhabitants in 11,950 households.

=== Administrative divisions ===
Central District (Miyan Jolgeh County) (Note: As Miyan Jolgeh District of Nishapur County at the 2006, 2011, and 2016 censuses)
Administrative Divisions	2006	2011	2016
Belharat RD (Note: Transferred to Belharat District after the 2016 census)	11,677	11,896	12,074
Eshqabad RD	15,280	15,711	16,270
Ghazali RD	8,835	8,988	8,951
Eshqabad (city)	1,325	1,883	1,993
Total	37,117	38,478	39,288
RD = Rural District
