= Taq =

Taq or TAQ may refer to:

- Taq, Iran, a village in Semnan Province
- Taq, a medieval fortress in the historical region of Sistan, possibly the ruins at Shahr-i Gholghola in present-day Afghanistan
- TAQ (role-playing game), published 1991
- Taq polymerase, a heat-stable enzyme used in polymerase chain reaction
  - Thermus aquaticus, the species of bacteria from which the polymerase is naturally derived
- Terminus ante quem, the latest possible date for a specific event
- Trade and Quote (TAQ), a form of high frequency data used by stock exchanges
