= Abirabad =

Abirabad (Persian: عبيراباد) may refer to:

- Abirabad, Razavi Khorasan
- Abirabad, Semnan
