= Siah Pareh =

Village in Semnan province, Iran

Siah Pareh Persian: سياه پره
- Village
- Location within Iran
- Coordinates: 36°12′25″N 53°52′36″E
- Country: Iran
- Province: Semnan
- County: Damghan
- District: Central
- Rural District: Rudbar

Population (2016)
  - Total: 77
- Time zone: UTC+3:30 (IRST)

Siah Pareh (Persian: سياه پره) (Note: Also romanized as Sīāh Pareh) is a village in Rudbar Rural District of the Central District in Damghan County, Semnan province, Iran.

== Demographics ==
=== Population ===
At the time of the 2006 National Census, the village's population was 39 in 13 households. The following census in 2011 counted 107 people in 29 households. The 2016 census measured the population of the village as 77 people in 28 households.
