= Agareh =

Village in Semnan province, Iran

Agareh Persian: اگره
- Village
- Location within Iran
- Coordinates: 36°09′33″N 53°49′59″E
- Country: Iran
- Province: Semnan
- County: Damghan
- District: Central
- Rural District: Rudbar

Population (2016)
  - Total: 346
- Time zone: UTC+3:30 (IRST)

Agareh (Persian: اگره) (Note: Also romanized as Agreh; also known as Agira) is a village in Rudbar Rural District of the Central District in Damghan County, Semnan province, Iran.

== Demographics ==
=== Population ===
At the time of the 2006 National Census, the village's population was 48 in 24 households. The following census in 2011 counted 353 people in 103 households. The 2016 census measured the population of the village as 346 people in 111 households.
