= Zarrinabad, Semnan =

Village in Semnan province, Iran

Zarrinabad Persian: زرين آباد
- Village
- Location within Iran
- Coordinates: 36°12′56″N 54°34′58″E
- Country: Iran
- Province: Semnan
- County: Damghan
- District: Central
- Rural District: Damankuh

Population (2016)
  - Total: 314
- Time zone: UTC+3:30 (IRST)

Zarrinabad (Persian: زرين آباد) (Note: Also romanized as Zarrīnābād) is a village in Damankuh Rural District of the Central District in Damghan County, Semnan province, Iran.

== Demographics ==
=== Population ===
At the time of the 2006 National Census, the village's population was 288 in 98 households. The following census in 2011 counted 237 people in 81 households. The 2016 census measured the population of the village as 314 people in 127 households.
