= Namakeh =

Village in Semnan province, Iran

Namakeh Persian: نمكه
- Village
- Location within Iran
- Coordinates: 36°25′45″N 54°07′30″E
- Country: Iran
- Province: Semnan
- County: Damghan
- District: Central
- Rural District: Rudbar

Population (2016)
  - Total: 62
- Time zone: UTC+3:30 (IRST)

Namakeh (Persian: نمكه) is a village in Rudbar Rural District of the Central District in Damghan County, Semnan province, Iran.

== Demographics ==
=== Population ===
At the time of the 2006 National Census, the village's population was 38 in 13 households. The following census in 2011 counted 58 people in 18 households. The 2016 census measured the population of the village as 62 people in 23 households.
