= Firuzabad, Damghan =

Village in Semnan province, Iran

Firuzabad Persian: فيروز آباد
- Village
- Location within Iran
- Coordinates: 36°10′08″N 54°22′38″E
- Country: Iran
- Province: Semnan
- County: Damghan
- District: Central
- Rural District: Howmeh

Population (2016)
  - Total: 417
- Time zone: UTC+3:30 (IRST)

Firuzabad (Persian: فيروز آباد) (Note: Also romanized as Fīrūzābād) is a village in Howmeh Rural District of the Central District in Damghan County, Semnan province,

== Demographics ==
=== Population ===
At the time of the 2006 National Census, the village's population was 332 in 96 households. The following census in 2011 counted 292 people in 97 households. The 2016 census measured the population of the village as 417 people in 146 households.
