= Hundred Gates =

Hundred Gates may refer to:

- Hecatompylos, a capital of the Parthian Empire
- Hundred-Gated Thebes, a city of ancient Egypt
- Meah Shearim, a neighbourhood of Jerusalem, Israel
