= Sorkh Deh, Semnan =

Village in Semnan province, Iran

Sorkh Deh Persian: سرخده
- Village
- Location within Iran
- Coordinates: 36°11′06″N 53°52′03″E
- Country: Iran
- Province: Semnan
- County: Damghan
- District: Central
- Rural District: Rudbar

Population (2016)
  - Total: 188
- Time zone: UTC+3:30 (IRST)

Sorkh Deh (Persian: سرخده) is a village in Rudbar Rural District of the Central District in Damghan County, Semnan province, Iran.

== Demographics ==
=== Population ===
At the time of the 2006 National Census, the village's population was 111 in 36 households. The following census in 2011 counted 245 people in 75 households. The 2016 census measured the population of the village as 188 people in 61 households.
