= Mehmandust, Semnan =

Village in Semnan province, Iran

Mehmandust Persian: مهماندوست
- Village
- Location within Iran
- Coordinates: 36°13′06″N 54°33′23″E
- Country: Iran
- Province: Semnan
- County: Damghan
- District: Central
- Rural District: Damankuh

Population (2016)
  - Total: 1,118
- Time zone: UTC+3:30 (IRST)

Mehmandust (Persian: مهماندوست) (Note: Also romanized as Mehmāndūst) is a village in, and the capital of, Damankuh Rural District in the Central District of Damghan County, Semnan province, Iran.

== Demographics ==
=== Population ===
At the time of the 2006 National Census, the village's population was 937 in 264 households. The following census in 2011 counted 744 people in 225 households. The 2016 census measured the population of the village as 1,118 people in 364 households, the most populous in its rural district.
