= Tazareh, Semnan =

Village in Semnan province, Iran

Tazareh Persian: طزره
- Village
- Location within Iran
- Coordinates: 36°23′56″N 54°28′52″E
- Country: Iran
- Province: Semnan
- County: Damghan
- District: Central
- Rural District: Damankuh

Population (2016)
  - Total: 267
- Time zone: UTC+3:30 (IRST)

Tazareh (Persian: طزره) (Note: Also romanized as Ţazareh and Ţazereh; also known as Tajar and Ţarzeh) is a village in Damankuh Rural District of the Central District in Damghan County, Semnan province, Iran.

== Demographics ==
=== Population ===
At the time of the 2006 National Census, the village's population was 214 in 52 households. The following census in 2011 counted 243 people in 89 households. The 2016 census measured the population of the village as 267 people in 97 households.
