= Jazan, Semnan =

Village in Semnan province, Iran

Jazan Persian: جزن
- Village
- Location within Iran
- Coordinates: 36°12′33″N 54°23′39″E
- Country: Iran
- Province: Semnan
- County: Damghan
- District: Central
- Rural District: Howmeh

Population (2016)
  - Total: 1,818
- Time zone: UTC+3:30 (IRST)

Jazan (Persian: جزن) (Note: Also known as Gaz) is a village in Howmeh Rural District of the Central District in Damghan County, Semnan province, Iran.

== Demographics ==
=== Population ===
At the time of the 2006 National Census, the village's population was 1,292 in 340 households. The following census in 2011 counted 1,166 people in 353 households. The 2016 census measured the population of the village as 1,818 people in 577 households, the most populous in its rural district.
