= Jameh Mosque of Damghan =

Mosque in Damghan, Semnan, Iran

Jāmeh Mosque of Damghan
- مسجد جامع دامغان
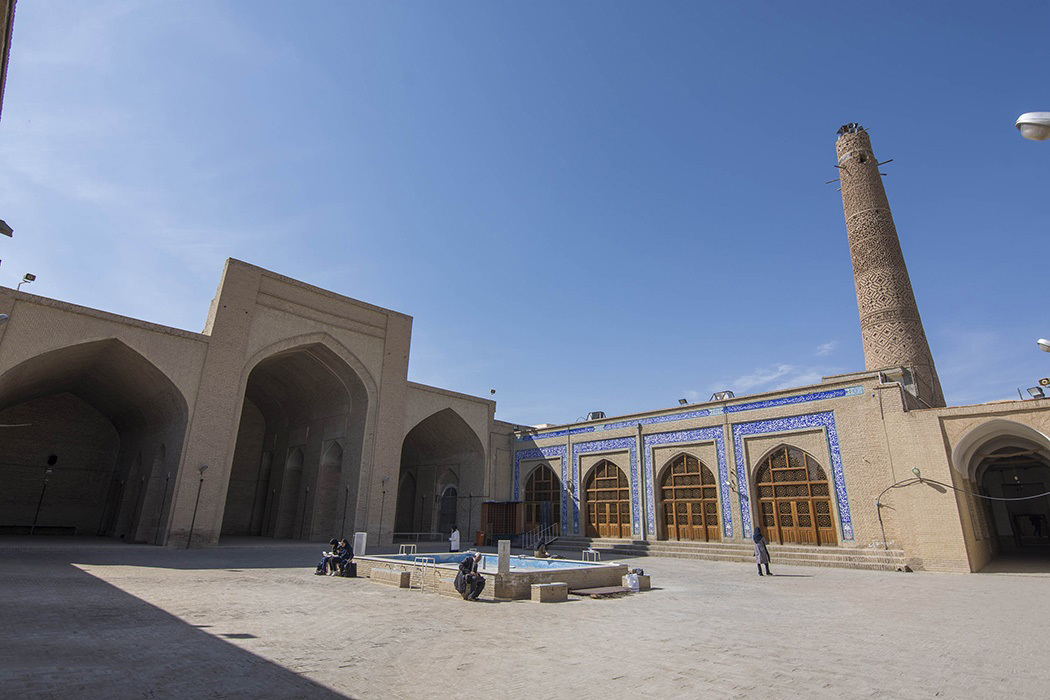
- The mosque with minaret in 2019

- Location of the mosque in Iran

Religion
- Affiliation: Shia Islam
- Ecclesiastical or organisational status: Friday mosque
- Status: Active

Location
- Location: Damghan, Semnan Province
- Country: Iran
- Coordinates: 36°10′0″N 54°21′4″E

Architecture
- Type: Mosque architecture
- Style: Abbasid; Seljuk; Qajar
- Completed: 11th century; 1932 (renovations)

Specifications
- Dome: One (maybe more)
- Minaret: One
- Minaret height: 27 m (89 ft)
- Materials: Bricks; plaster; tiles

Iran National Heritage List
- Official name: Friday Mosque of Damghan
- Type: Friday Mosque
- Designated: 1932
- Reference no.: 81
- Conservation organization: Cultural Heritage, Handicrafts and Tourism Organization of Iran

The Jāmeh Mosque of Damghan (Persian: مسجد جامع دامغان, romanized: Masjid-i Jami' (Damghan); Arabic: جامع دامغان) is a Shi'ite Friday mosque (jāmeh), located in Damghan, in the province of Semnan, Iran. Commenced during the Abbasid Caliphate era, the mosque was renovated during the Seljuq and Qajar eras. The mosque is notable for its 11th-century minaret.

The mosque was added to the Iran National Heritage List on 6 January 1932, administered by the Cultural Heritage, Handicrafts and Tourism Organization of Iran.

== Architecture ==
The Friday mosque of Damghan is located in the northeast corner of the city. While its original construction date is estimated to be eleventh century or earlier, during the Abbasid Caliphate era, it was replaced by a newer structure in the Seljuq and Qajar period, under Mirza Mohammadkhan Sepahsalar.

The mosque is oriented north-south and is centered on a large rectangular courtyard measuring 28 by 36 metres (92 by 118 ft). It is entered from a wide corridor that opens onto the northern corner of the courtyard. The southwestern (qibla) side of the courtyard is occupied by three large iwans. The larger, central iwan, flanked by two smaller iwans on either side, is 7 metres (23 ft) wide and 16 metres (52 ft) long. Two vaulted prayer halls enclose the courtyard.

A Seljuk-era minaret, built c. 1058 CE, still extant and original, remains on the site. Located in the northeast corner of the mosque, the minaret rises from a base adjoining the entrance corridor and is 27 metres (89 ft) high, round, made of bricks, and contains 105 steps. Its diameter at the base is nearly 14 metres (46 ft), which shrinks to 7 metres (23 ft) at its top. Decorated with recessed bricks in highly original geometric patterns, the minaret displays all the characteristics of eleventh-century art found in other Damghan monuments. Although originally freestanding, the minaret is now attached to the mosque structure. The minaret's brick balcony, partially ruined, is supported by a projecting ring of muqarnas and is decorated with a chapter from the Qur'an. A Kufic inscription plate further ornaments the minaret. The glazed tile work on the minaret is one of the earliest examples in Iran.

== Gallery ==
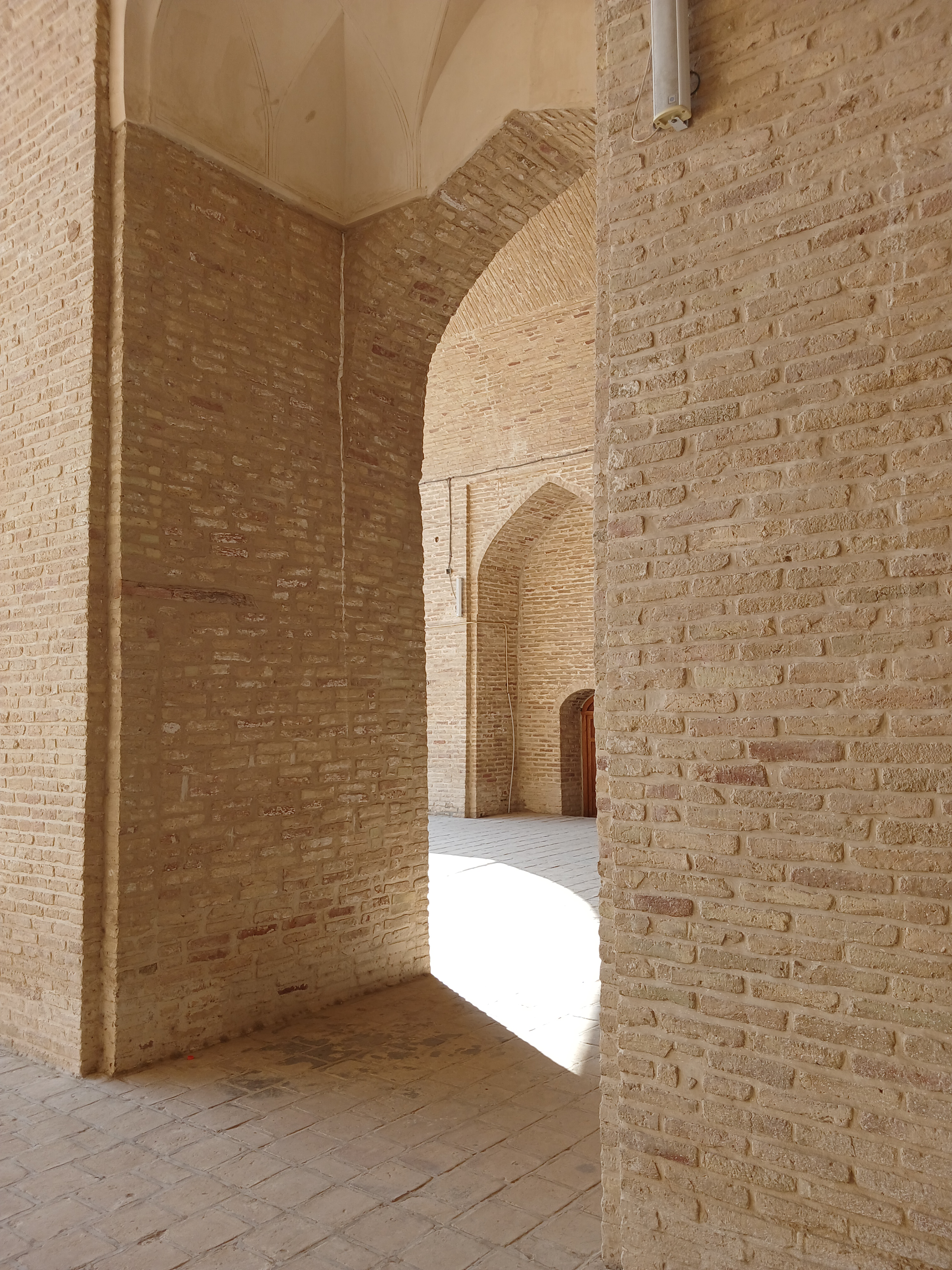

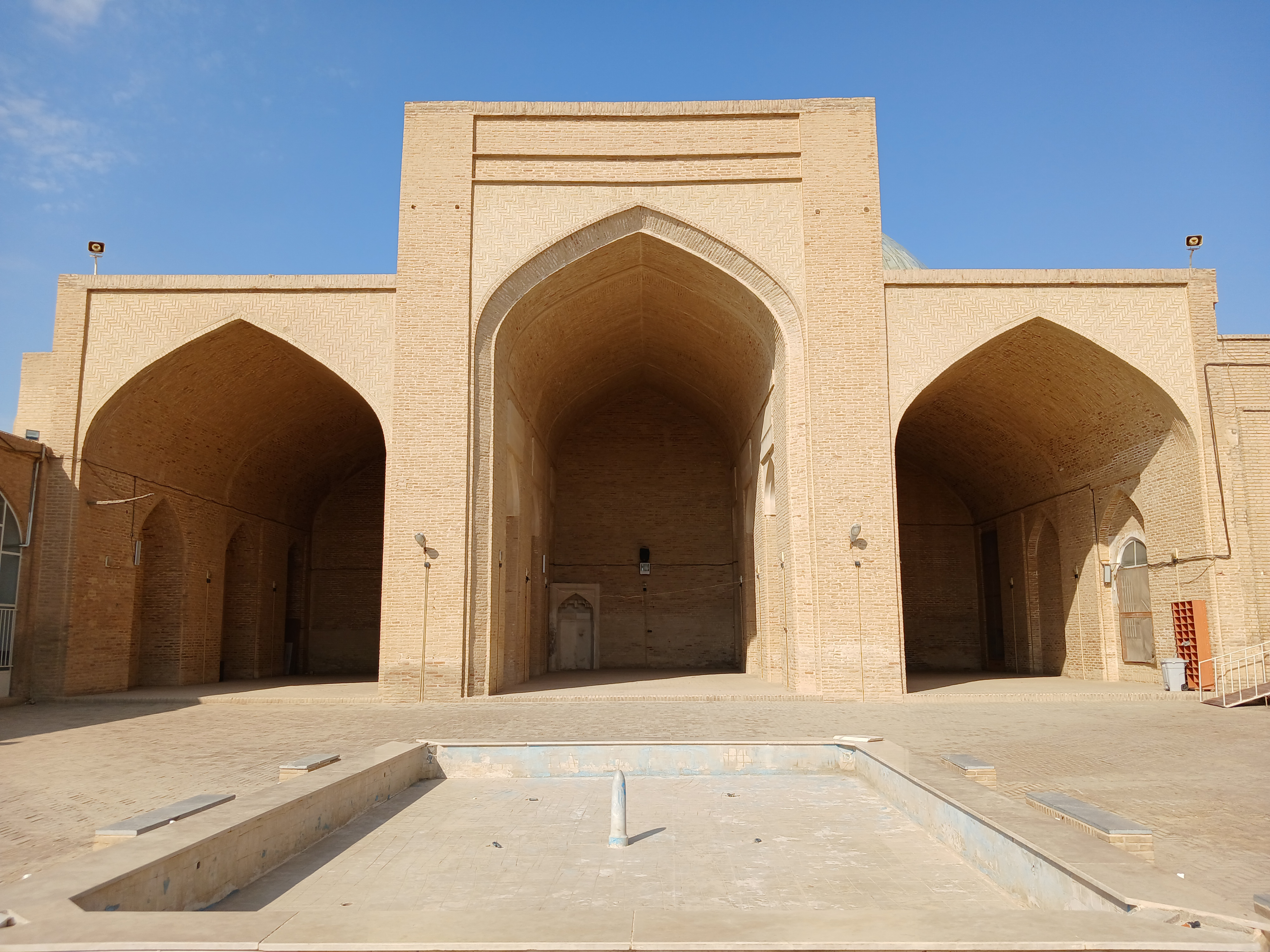

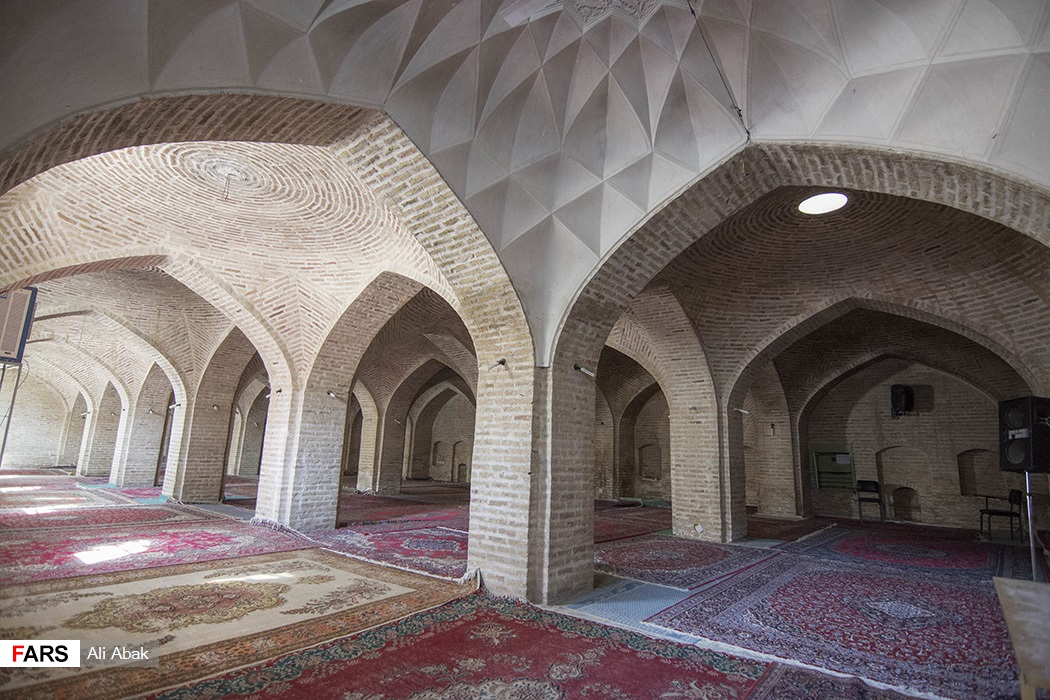
Prayer hall interior in 2019

== See also ==
- Shia Islam in Iran
- List of mosques in Iran
