= Haddadeh =

Village in Semnan province, Iran

Haddadeh Persian: حداده
- Village
- Location within Iran
- Coordinates: 36°15′41″N 54°44′06″E
- Country: Iran
- Province: Semnan
- County: Damghan
- District: Central
- Rural District: Damankuh

Population (2016)
  - Total: 249
- Time zone: UTC+3:30 (IRST)

Haddadeh (Persian: حداده) (Note: Also romanized as 'Ḩaddādeh) is a village in Damankuh Rural District of the Central District in Damghan County, Semnan province, Iran.

== Demographics ==
=== Population ===
At the time of the 2006 National Census, the village's population was 243 in 82 households. The following census in 2011 counted 191 people in 72 households. The 2016 census measured the population of the village as 249 people in 98 households.
