= Heydarabad, Semnan =

Village in Semnan province, Iran

Heydarabad Persian: حيدر آباد
- Village
- Location within Iran
- Coordinates: 36°09′46″N 54°23′31″E
- Country: Iran
- Province: Semnan
- County: Damghan
- District: Central
- Rural District: Howmeh

Population (2016)
  - Total: 176
- Time zone: UTC+3:30 (IRST)

Heydarabad (Persian: حيدر آباد) (Note: Also romanized as Ḩeydarābād) is a village in Howmeh Rural District of the Central District in Damghan County, Semnan province,

== Demographics ==
=== Population ===
At the time of the 2006 National Census, the village's population was 203 in 59 households. The following census in 2011 counted 170 people in 54 households. The 2016 census measured the population of the village as 176 people in 66 households.
