= Kalateh-ye Molla, Damghan =

Village in Semnan province, Iran

Kalateh-ye Molla Persian: كلاته ملا
- Village
- Location within Iran
- Coordinates: 36°15′58″N 54°43′14″E
- Country: Iran
- Province: Semnan
- County: Damghan
- District: Central
- Rural District: Damankuh

Population (2016)
  - Total: 439
- Time zone: UTC+3:30 (IRST)

Kalateh-ye Molla (Persian: كلاته ملا) (Note: Also romanized as Kalāteh Mollā and Kalāteh-ye Mollā) is a village in Damankuh Rural District of the Central District in Damghan County, Semnan province, Iran.

== Demographics ==
=== Population ===
At the time of the 2006 National Census, the village's population was 517 in 164 households. The following census in 2011 counted 481 people in 179 households. The 2016 census measured the population of the village as 439 people in 166 households.
