= Hoseynabad-e Dulab =

Village in Semnan province, Iran

Hoseynabad-e Dulab Persian: حسين آباد دولاب
- Village
- Location within Iran
- Coordinates: 36°13′39″N 54°36′04″E
- Country: Iran
- Province: Semnan
- County: Damghan
- District: Central
- Rural District: Damankuh

Population (2016)
  - Total: 259
- Time zone: UTC+3:30 (IRST)

Hoseynabad-e Dulab (Persian: حسين آباد دولابا) (Note: Also romanized as Ḩoseynābād-e Dūlāb; formerly known as Hoseynabad-e Dula (حسين آباد دولا), also romanized as Ḩoseynābād-e Dūlā; also known as Ḩoseynābād and Husainābād) is a village in Damankuh Rural District of the Central District in Damghan County, Semnan province, Iran.

== Demographics ==
=== Population ===
At the time of the 2006 National Census, the village's population, as Hoseynabad-e Dula, was 338 in 113 households. The following census in 2011 counted 289 people in 98 households, by which time the village was listed as Hoseynabad-e Dulab. The 2016 census measured the population of the village as 259 people in 102 households.
