= Moradabad, Semnan =

Village in Semnan province, Iran

Moradabad Persian: مراد آباد
- Village
- Location within Iran
- Coordinates: 36°15′33″N 54°45′29″E
- Country: Iran
- Province: Semnan
- County: Damghan
- District: Central
- Rural District: Damankuh

Population (2016)
  - Total: 253
- Time zone: UTC+3:30 (IRST)

Moradabad (Persian: مراد آباد) (Note: Also romanized as Morādābād) is a village in Damankuh Rural District of the Central District in Damghan County, Semnan province, Iran.

== Demographics ==
=== Population ===
At the time of the 2006 National Census, the village's population was 174 in 55 households. The following census in 2011 counted 203 people in 74 households. The 2016 census measured the population of the village as 253 people in 93 households.
