= Ayanu =

Ayanu may refer to:

- Workitu Ayanu, Ethiophian runner
- Ayanu, Iran
