= Shahrasazi Tazareh =

Village in Semnan province, Iran

Shahrasazi Tazareh Persian: شهرسازي طزره
- Village
- Country: Iran
- Province: Semnan
- County: Damghan
- District: Central
- Rural District: Damankuh

Population (2016)
  - Total: 34
- Time zone: UTC+3:30 (IRST)

Shahrasazi Tazareh (Persian: شهرسازي طزره) (Note: Also romanized as Shahrsāzī Ţazareh) is a village in Damankuh Rural District of the Central District in Damghan County, Semnan province, Iran.

== Demographics ==
=== Population ===
At the time of the 2006 National Census, the village's population was 413 in 96 households. The following census in 2011 counted 423 people in 130 households. The 2016 census measured the population of the village as 34 people in 10 households.
