= Dibaj =

City in Semnan province, Iran

Dibaj Persian: ديباج
- City
- Location within Iran
- Coordinates: 36°25′50″N 54°13′47″E
- Country: Iran
- Province: Semnan
- County: Damghan
- District: Central
- Established as a city: 1993

Population (2016)
  - Total: 5,647
- Time zone: UTC+3:30 (IRST)

Dibaj (Persian: ديباج) (Note: Also romanized as Dibadj; formerly known as Chahārdeh, Chārdeh, and Chehārdeh; and Qal‘eh (قلعه)) is a city in the Central District of Damghan County, Semnan province, Iran. It was the administrative center for Rudbar Rural District until its capital was transferred to the city of Kalateh.

Dibaj is 55 kilometres (34 mi) north of the city of Damghan, in the heart of the Alborz mountains. It is situated along the Mazandaran road, and is the main town in northern Damghan County. It was formerly named Chahardeh, a set of villages which were merged to form the city of Dibaj in 1993.

== Etymology ==
The city was earlier called Chahardeh, as it was a set of four villages: Qaleh-ye Chahardeh (قلعه چهارده), Varzan (ورزن), Zardavan (زردوان), and Aminabad (امین‌آباد). Chahardeh means "four villages:" chahar is the Indo-Iranian word for "four," and deh is for "village." Now there are only three villages, as Aminabad was destroyed by natural causes like earthquakes, floods and/or (as it is said) by military invasion. Today, Aminabad is called Kherab Deh by local people, meaning "ruined or destroyed village."

When the Chahardeh changed to city, the name Dibaj was chosen. Adopted from an Imamzadeh to the southwest of town, in Qaleh village. The tomb said to be for Mohammad son of Imam Sadeq known as Mohammad-i-Dibaj. Dibaj is arabized for Persian Diba (Silk).

== History ==
There is not too much to say about this small town, but locals say the story of Zand dynasty invasion. Karim Khan's half brother, Zaki Khan invaded here pursuing Qajar troops. The people of village escaped to mountain. He took an oath on a brick, saying: "I swear to this (addressing the brick in his hand), not to harm you". Peasants thought he swore to Quran, the Muslim holy book, came down, faced a massacre and their village devastated by Zand troops.

Later, Karim Khan defeated Mohammad Hassan Khan Qajar, to show his kindness to Qajar tribe, assigns Hosseyn Qoli Khan (elder son of Qajar Khan) to rule Damghan county, and keeps Agha Mohammad Khan with himself in Shiraz. Once the people of a village near Dibaj, rebelled against Hosseyn Qoli; in response, he burned the village. Hence, he is called Jahansooz (the burner of world).

== Demographics ==
=== Language and religion ===
The people are mostly Shia Muslim. Their language is very near to Mazandarani; however, it has many words that Damghanis use and are even used by other dialects of Iranian languages. For example, the words like khin (Persian: Khoon, English: Blood), dee (Persian: Dood, English: Smoke), bashim (Persian: Beshavim, English: Let's Go), banish (Persian: Beshin, English: Sit Down) can be seen in Lori dialects.

=== Population ===
At the time of the 2006 National Census, the city's population was 2,504 in 680 households. The following census in 2011 counted 3,774 people in 1,158 households. The 2016 census measured the population of the city as 5,647 people in 1,960 households.

== Geography ==
Located at the heart of Alborz, near the source of Damghan River, which starts from here and later combine with Ali Spring (Cheshmeh Ali) waters and pass through Damghan city to Dasht-e Kavir. It's cold in winter but nice in summer. The main permanent spring, Sar Cheshmeh make the region fertile for agriculture and gardening.

== Agriculture, gardening and industry ==
The main garden products are walnuts, apple, cherry, Sour Cherry and Apricot. Peasants also grow wheat and potato.

There is an aluminum-casting factory near the town that produces car engine parts. A facial tissue plant is also planned.

== See also ==
- Mazandarani people

== Sources ==
- Tarikhe Damghan- Keshavarz, Mohammad Ali, Qomes Publishing, Tehran, 1993
