= Mowmenabad, Damghan =

Village in Semnan province, Iran

Mowmenabad Persian: مومن آباد
- Village
- Location within Iran
- Coordinates: 36°15′32″N 54°40′34″E
- Country: Iran
- Province: Semnan
- County: Damghan
- District: Central
- Rural District: Damankuh

Population (2016)
  - Total: 700
- Time zone: UTC+3:30 (IRST)

Mowmenabad (Persian: مؤمن‌آباد) (Note: Also romanized as Mow’menābād) is a village in Damankuh Rural District of the Central District in Damghan County, Semnan province, Iran.

== Demographics ==
=== Population ===
At the time of the 2006 National Census, the village's population was 550 in 159 households. The following census in 2011 counted 558 people in 182 households. The 2016 census measured the population of the village as 700 people in 240 households.
