= Mehman Duyeh =

Village in Semnan province, Iran

Mehman Duyeh Persian: مهماندويه
- Village
- Location within Iran
- Coordinates: 36°25′10″N 54°34′08″E
- Country: Iran
- Province: Semnan
- County: Damghan
- District: Central
- Rural District: Damankuh

Population (2016)
  - Total: 313
- Time zone: UTC+3:30 (IRST)

Mehman Duyeh (Persian: مهماندويه) (Note: Also romanized as Mehmān Dūyeh) is a village in Damankuh Rural District of the Central District in Damghan County, Semnan province, Iran.

== Demographics ==
=== Population ===
At the time of the 2006 National Census, the village's population was 115 in 39 households. The following census in 2011 counted 139 people in 50 households. The 2016 census measured the population of the village as 313 people in 84 households.

== Gas-poisoning incident ==
In April 2025, a gas-poisoning incident at a small, unregistered coal mine near Mehman Duyeh led to the deaths of seven miners. Four were Iranian citizens and three were foreign workers. They all died from carbon monoxide exposure, according to state media.
