= Naimabad, Semnan =

Village in Semnan province, Iran

Naimabad Persian: نعيم آباد
- Village
- Location within Iran
- Coordinates: 36°15′02″N 54°37′07″E
- Country: Iran
- Province: Semnan
- County: Damghan
- District: Central
- Rural District: Damankuh

Population (2016)
  - Total: 121
- Time zone: UTC+3:30 (IRST)

Naimabad (Persian: نعيم آباد) (Note: Also romanized as Na‘īmābād) is a village in Damankuh Rural District of the Central District in Damghan County, Semnan province, Iran. Most of the people in the village are farmers and the main product is pistachios.

== Demographics ==
=== Population ===
At the time of the 2006 National Census, the village's population was 155 in 62 households. The following census in 2011 counted 128 people in 45 households. The 2016 census measured the population of the village as 121 people in 52 households.
