= Tuyeh, Rudbar =

Village in Semnan province, Iran

Tuyeh Persian: تويه
- Village
- Location within Iran
- Coordinates: 36°26′52″N 54°09′53″E
- Country: Iran
- Province: Semnan
- County: Damghan
- District: Central
- Rural District: Rudbar

Population (2016)
  - Total: 423
- Time zone: UTC+3:30 (IRST)

Tuyeh (Persian: تويه) (Note: Also romanized as Tooyeh and Tūyeh; also known as Ţorūdbār, Turndbār, Turudbār, Tūyeh Darvār, Tūyeh Rūdbār, and Tūyeh-ye Rūdbār) is a village in Rudbar Rural District of the Central District in Damghan County, Semnan province, Iran.

== Demographics ==
=== Population ===
At the time of the 2006 National Census, the village's population was 256 in 71 households. The following census in 2011 counted 532 people in 164 households. The 2016 census measured the population of the village as 423 people in 151 households.
