= Badeleh Kuh =

Village in Semnan province, Iran

Badeleh Kuh Persian: بادله كوه
- Village
- Location within Iran
- Coordinates: 36°23′36″N 53°57′07″E
- Country: Iran
- Province: Semnan
- County: Damghan
- District: Central
- Rural District: Rudbar

Population (2016)
  - Total: 313
- Time zone: UTC+3:30 (IRST)

Badeleh Kuh (Persian: بادله كوه) (Note: Also romanized as Bādeleh Kūh; also known as Bādeleh) is a village in Rudbar Rural District of the Central District in Damghan County, Semnan province, Iran.

== Demographics ==
=== Population ===
At the time of the 2006 National Census, the village's population was 144 in 24 households. The following census in 2011 counted 300 people in 85 households. The 2016 census measured the population of the village as 313 people in 99 households.
