= Qaleh-ye Pain Baram =

Village in Semnan province, Iran

Qaleh-ye Pain Baram Persian: قلعه پائين برم
- Village
- Location within Iran
- Coordinates: 36°08′35″N 54°25′24″E
- Country: Iran
- Province: Semnan
- County: Damghan
- District: Central
- Rural District: Howmeh

Population (2016)
  - Total: 421
- Time zone: UTC+3:30 (IRST)

Qaleh-ye Pain Baram (Persian: قلعه پائين برم) (Note: Also romanized as Qal‘eh-e Pā’īn Baram) is a village in, and the capital of, Howmeh Rural District in the Central District of Damghan County, Semnan province, Iran.

== Demographics ==
=== Population ===
At the time of the 2006 National Census, the village's population was 350 in 89 households. The following census in 2011 counted 413 people in 141 households. The 2016 census measured the population of the village as 421 people in 148 households.
