= Vamarzan =

Village in Semnan province, Iran

Vamarzan Persian: وامرزان
- Village
- Location within Iran
- Coordinates: 36°10′47″N 54°25′56″E
- Country: Iran
- Province: Semnan
- County: Damghan
- District: Central
- Rural District: Howmeh

Population (2016)
  - Total: 283
- Time zone: UTC+3:30 (IRST)

Vamarzan (Persian: وامرزان) (Note: Also romanized as Vāmarzān and Vāmarzan) is a village in Howmeh Rural District of the Central District in Damghan County, Semnan province,

== Demographics ==
=== Population ===
At the time of the 2006 National Census, the village's population was 343 in 102 households. The following census in 2011 counted 335 people in 109 households. The 2016 census measured the population of the village as 283 people in 92 households.
