= Mayan, Semnan =

Village in Semnan province, Iran

Mayan Persian: مايان
- Village
- Location within Iran
- Coordinates: 36°10′29″N 54°24′43″E
- Country: Iran
- Province: Semnan
- County: Damghan
- District: Central
- Rural District: Howmeh

Population (2016)
  - Total: 312
- Time zone: UTC+3:30 (IRST)

Mayan (Persian: مايان) (Note: Also romanized as Māyān) is a village in Howmeh Rural District of the Central District in Damghan County, Semnan province,

== Demographics ==
=== Population ===
At the time of the 2006 National Census, the village's population was 286 in 103 households. The following census in 2011 counted 266 people in 94 households. The 2016 census measured the population of the village as 312 people in 110 households.
