= Abdolabad, Semnan =

Village in Semnan province, Iran

Abdolabad Persian: عبدل آباد
- Village
- Location within Iran
- Coordinates: 36°15′12″N 54°42′47″E
- Country: Iran
- Province: Semnan
- County: Damghan
- District: Central
- Rural District: Damankuh

Population (2016)
  - Total: 0
- Time zone: UTC+3:30 (IRST)

Abdolabad (Persian: عبدل آباد) (Note: Also romanized as ‘Abdolābād; also known as ‘Abdūlābād) is a village in Damankuh Rural District of the Central District in Damghan County, Semnan province, Iran.

== Demographics ==
=== Population ===
At the time of the 2006 National Census, the village's population was 22 in five households. The following census in 2011 counted 21 people in nine households. The 2016 census measured the population of the village as zero.
