= Hajjiabad-e Bostijian =

Village in Semnan province, Iran

Hajjiabad-e Bostijian Persian: حاجي آباد بستيجيان
- Village
- Location within Iran
- Coordinates: 36°11′57″N 54°24′36″E
- Country: Iran
- Province: Semnan
- County: Damghan
- District: Central
- Rural District: Howmeh

Population (2016)
  - Total: 163
- Time zone: UTC+3:30 (IRST)

Hajjiabad-e Bostijian (Persian: حاجي آباد بستيجيان) (Note: Also romanized as Hajjiabad-e Bostījīān; also known as Bozījān, Buzīdjān, Haji Abad Bostjan, Ḩājjīābād, Ḩājjīābād-e Bosījān, Ḩājjīābād-e Bostejān, and Ḩājjīābād-e Bostījān) is a village in Howmeh Rural District of the Central District in Damghan County, Semnan province,

== Demographics ==
=== Population ===
At the time of the 2006 National Census, the village's population was 98 in 36 households. The following census in 2011 counted 172 people in 61 households. The 2016 census measured the population of the village as 163 people in 57 households.
