= Baq, Semnan =

Village in Semnan province, Iran

Baq Persian: بق
- Village
- Location within Iran
- Coordinates: 36°12′38″N 54°26′57″E
- Country: Iran
- Province: Semnan
- County: Damghan
- District: Central
- Rural District: Howmeh

Population (2016)
  - Total: 216
- Time zone: UTC+3:30 (IRST)

Baq (Persian: بق) is a village in Howmeh Rural District of the Central District in Damghan County, Semnan province, Iran.

== Demographics ==
=== Population ===
At the time of the 2006 National Census, the village's population was 182 in 68 households. The following census in 2011 counted 182 people in 67 households. The 2016 census measured the population of the village as 216 people in 84 households.
