= Kheyr-e Qaderabad =

Village in Semnan province, Iran

Kheyr-e Qaderabad Persian: خيرقادر آباد
- Village
- Location within Iran
- Coordinates: 36°15′46″N 54°38′23″E
- Country: Iran
- Province: Semnan
- County: Damghan
- District: Central
- Rural District: Damankuh

Population (2016)
  - Total: 85
- Time zone: UTC+3:30 (IRST)

Kheyr-e Qaderabad (Persian: خيرقادر آباد) (Note: Also romanized as Kheyr-e Qāderābād; formerly known as Qaderabad (قادر آباد), also romanized as Qāderābād) is a village in Damankuh Rural District of the Central District in Damghan County, Semnan province, Iran.

== Demographics ==
=== Population ===
At the time of the 2006 National Census, the village's population, as Qaderabad, was 94 in 38 households. The following census in 2011 counted 55 people in 25 households. The 2016 census measured the population of the village as 85 people in 36 households, by which time the village was listed as Kheyr-e Qaderabad.
