= Hoseynabad-e Hajji Ali Naqi =

Village in Semnan province, Iran

Hoseynabad-e Hajji Ali Naqi Persian: حسين آباد حاجي علي نقي
- Village
- Location within Iran
- Coordinates: 36°11′40″N 54°28′21″E
- Country: Iran
- Province: Semnan
- County: Damghan
- District: Central
- Rural District: Howmeh

Population (2016)
  - Total: 193
- Time zone: UTC+3:30 (IRST)

Hoseynabad-e Hajji Ali Naqi (Persian: حسين آباد حاجي علي نقي) (Note: Also romanized as Ḩoseynābād-e Ḩājjī ‘Alī Naqī; also known as Ḩoseynābād, Ḩoseynābād-e Ḩāj ‘Alī Naqī, Ḩoseynābād-e Ḩājj ‘Alī Naqī, and Husainābād) is a village in Howmeh Rural District of the Central District in Damghan County, Semnan province,

== Demographics ==
=== Population ===
At the time of the 2006 National Census, the village's population was 161 in 50 households. The following census in 2011 counted 95 people in 32 households. The 2016 census measured the population of the village as 193 people in 70 households.
