= Emamabad, Semnan =

Village in Semnan province, Iran

Emamabad Persian: امام آباد
- Village
- Location within Iran
- Coordinates: 36°12′13″N 54°33′18″E
- Country: Iran
- Province: Semnan
- County: Damghan
- District: Central
- Rural District: Damankuh

Population (2016)
  - Total: 320
- Time zone: UTC+3:30 (IRST)

Emamabad (Persian: امام آباد) (Note: Also romanized as Emāmābād) is a village in Damankuh Rural District of the Central District in Damghan County, Semnan province, Iran.

== Demographics ==
=== Population ===
At the time of the 2006 National Census, the village's population was 207 in 68 households. The following census in 2011 counted 301 people in 107 households. The 2016 census measured the population of the village as 320 people in 125 households.
