= Astan =

Village in Semnan province, Iran

Astan Persian: آستان
- Village
- Location within Iran
- Coordinates: 36°16′11″N 54°05′52″E
- Country: Iran
- Province: Semnan
- County: Damghan
- District: Central
- Rural District: Rudbar

Population (2016)
  - Total: 547
- Time zone: UTC+3:30 (IRST)

Astan (Persian: آستان) (Note: Also romanized as Āstān; also known as Āstāneh) is a village in Rudbar Rural District of the Central District in Damghan County, Semnan province, Iran.

== Demographics ==
=== Population ===
At the time of the 2006 National Census, the village's population was 305 in 89 households. The following census in 2011 counted 510 people in 167 households. The 2016 census measured the population of the village as 547 people in 185 households.
