= Damghan =

City in Semnan province, Iran

Damghan Persian: دامغان
- City
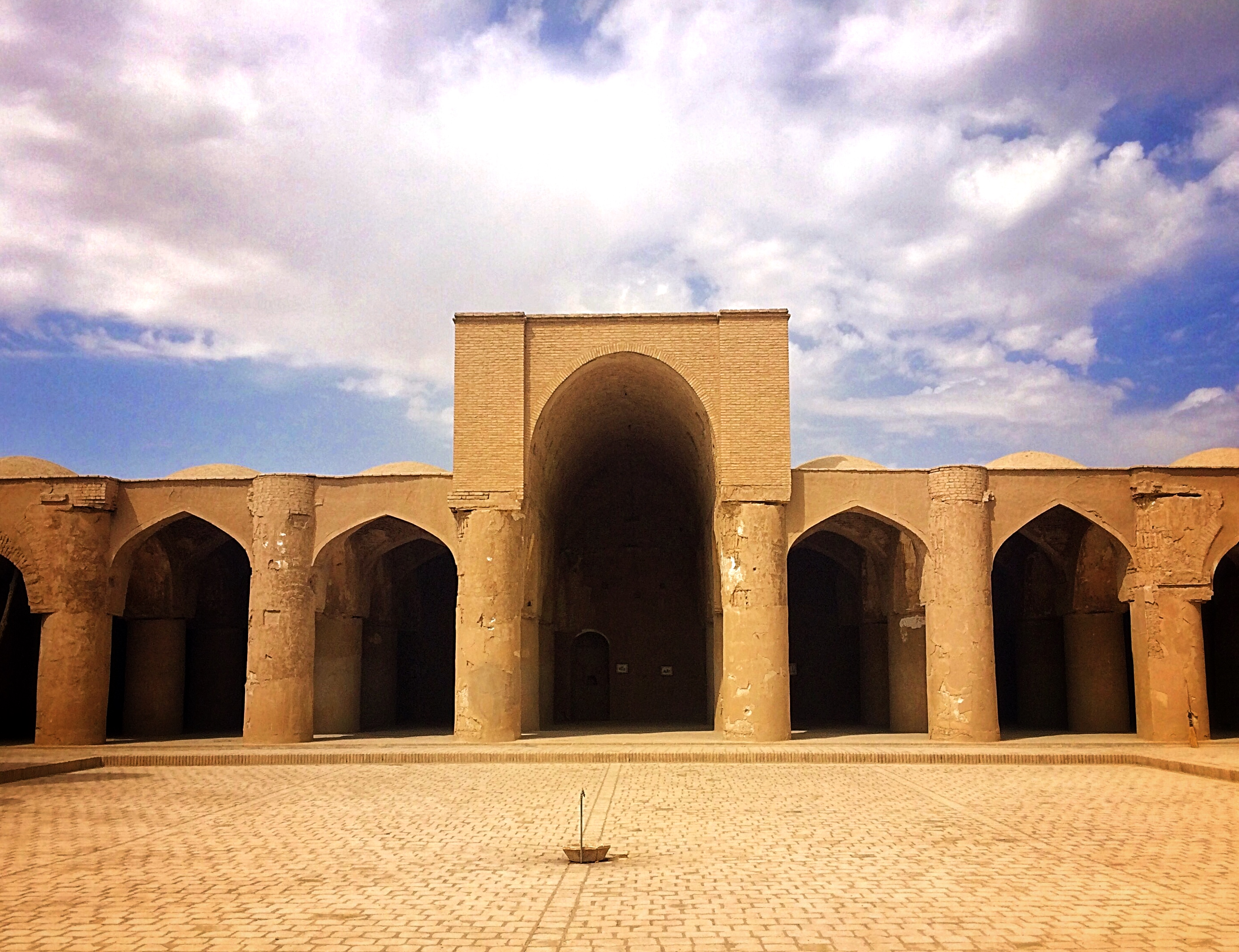

- Location within Iran
- Coordinates: 36°09′51″N 54°20′27″E
- Country: Iran
- Province: Semnan
- County: Damghan
- District: Central

Population (2021)
  - Total: 59,106
- Time zone: UTC+3:30 (IRST)

Damghan (Persian: دامغان) (Note: Also romanized as Dāmghān) is a city in the Central District of Damghan County, Semnan province, Iran, serving as capital of both the county and the district.

It is 342 km (213 mi) east of Tehran on the high-road to Mashad, at an elevation of 1,250 m (4,101 ft). Damghan is one of the oldest cities on the Iranian plateau, stretching back 7,000 years, and boasts many sites of historic interest. The oldest of these is Tappeh Hessar, lying to the southeast of the city, which holds the ruins of a castle dating from the Sasanian Empire.

The Tarikhaneh is one of the oldest mosques in Iran. Built as a fire temple during the Sassanid dynasty, it was converted into a mosque after the advent of Islam. There are also many other historical buildings belonging to the Seljuk Empire and other periods. Apart from its historical interest, the city today is mainly known for pistachios and paper almonds (kaghazi) with very thin shells.

== History ==
=== Tepe Hissar ===
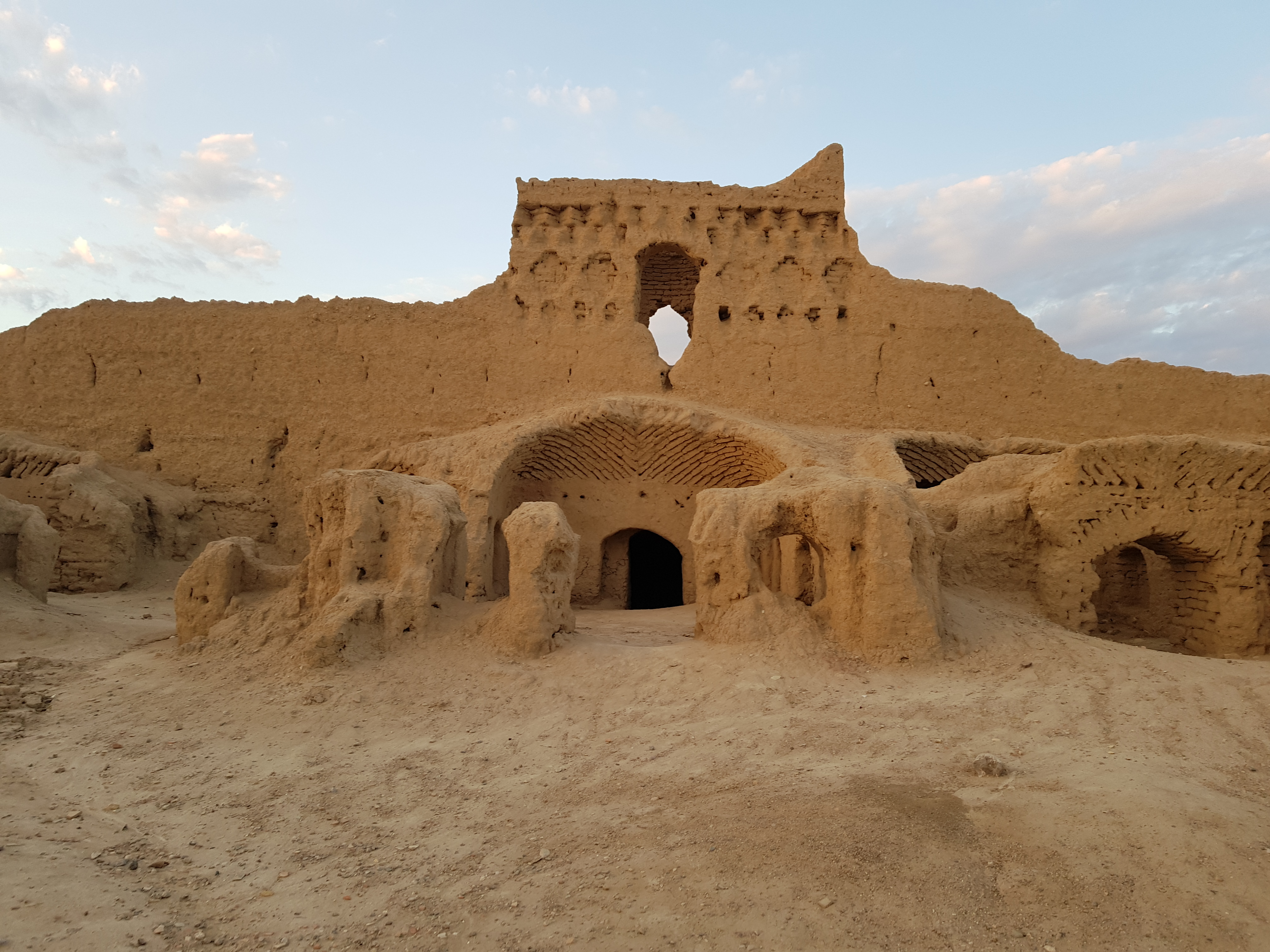
Tepe Hissar

Archaeological excavation has shown that the history of Damghan starts 4–5 thousand years BCE at Tepe Hissar in the village of Heydarabad. Tepe Hissar was inhabited in the Chalcolithic period in the fifth millennium BC.Radiocarbon dating in Tepe Hissar have revealed items 7,000 years old. Recently expansion of Tehran–Mashhad railway into double lanes the body of a woman along with her fetus was discovered with over 7,000 years age. Tepe Hissar, with several layers of civilizations. There was metal production in its earliest period. There are also several associated sites, such as Shir Ashian Tepe, another small settlement in the area, dating to the same time.

Part of the layers in the tepe belong to the Mades dynasty, which shared its civilization with Mesopotamia. Another layer covers the Achaemenid Empire, the Parthian Empire and Seleucid Empire. Tappeh Hessar achieved its peak of glory during the Seleucid and Parthian periods. Ernst Herzfeld (1931–1933) and Erich Schmidt (1933–1938) were the first archaeologists who explored the tepe. An archaeological dig there in 1996 revealed remains dating from the time of the Aryan settlement of the Iranian plateau (circa 4000 BCE) to the Median (728-550 BCE), the Arsacid (248-224 CE) and Sassanid (224-651 CE) dynastic periods.

=== Hecatompylos ===
The remains of Hecatompylos lie to the southwest of the city, extending from Forat, 26 kilometres (16 mi) south of Damghan, to nearly 32 kilometres (20 mi) west. After Alexander the Great's conquest of Persia, the nearby city of Hecatompylos ("hundred gates"), now called Šahr-e Qumis (Persian: شهر قومس) was the population centre. This name had also been given to Thebes, Greece and Thebes, Egypt.

=== Damghan ===
The name Damghan comes from "deh", village, and "moghan", Magi. This name was given by Zoroastrians, who included such people as Cyrus the Great and Darius the Great of the Achaemenid Empire. Historiographers ascribe the construction of Damghan to Hooshang, Keyumars' great-grandson and the founder of the legendary Pishdadi dynasty. The historical town was called Qumis, which was located in a region of the same name, stretching from Sabzevar to Garmsar, from north up to the Alborz mountain range and to the Lut Desert in the south. Up to the first century AD, Damghan was the capital of that great province.

The city was half destroyed in the 856 Damghan earthquake.

Damghan was an important city in the Middle Ages, but few remnants of that time remain; one is the ruined Tarikhaneh. The city was capital of the province of Qumis (Qoomes), but was destroyed by the Afghan Hotak dynasty in 1723.

== Demographics ==
=== Population ===
At the time of the 2006 National Census, the city's population was 57,331 in 15,849 households. The following census in 2011 counted 58,770 people in 16,861 households. The 2016 census measured the population of the city as 59,106 people in 18,417 households.

== Historical sites ==
=== Tarikhaneh Mosque ===
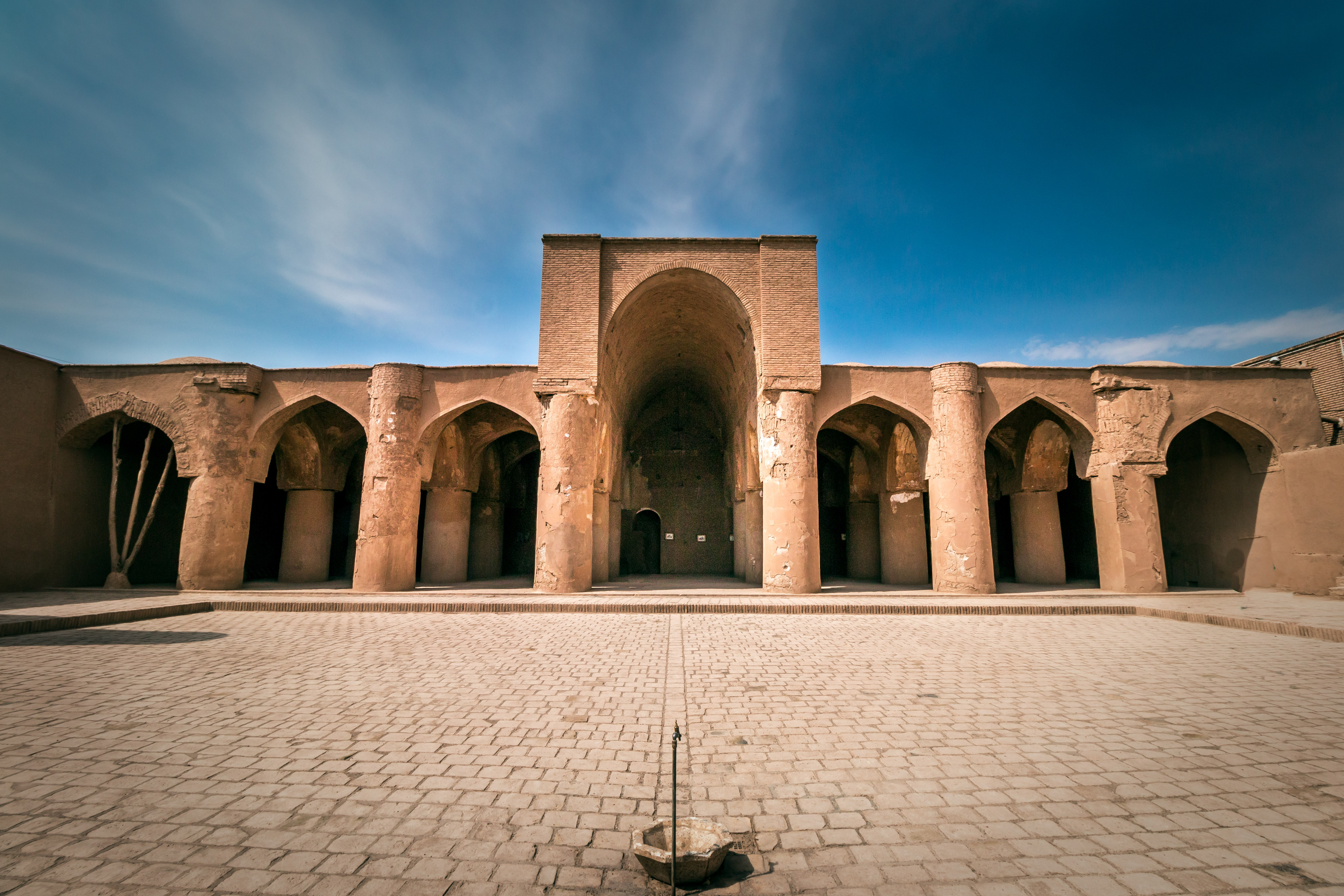
Tarikhaneh

Tarikhaneh Mosque is the oldest mosque in Iran, belonging to the first century after the Muslim conquest of Persia. It still preserves its original shape, with a number of massive columns and wood carvings and two minarets of the 11th century. The prefix "Tari", a Turkish or Mongol term, means God and "khaneh" is the Iranian word for house, so the word means the house of God.

Tarikhaneh and Na'in Mosque in Na'in are the only mosques in the Islamic world which resemble the Medina Mosque. This mosque was built during the eighth century AD by imitating Roman, Byzantine, Iranian and Arabic architecture. This is an Arabic design but the building material and architecture is Sassanid. Originally it was a fire temple during the Sassanid period, and later the mosque was built over its ruins. One column resembling Sassanian architecture at the eastern wing is a proof of this assertion.

Tarikhaneh Mosque is equipped with a square yard and a gallery with 18 columns facing the qibla and the three sides of the yard are surrounded by porticoes. The minaret rising over the mosque is said to belong to the Seljuk period and the tiled inscription over the minaret is in fact the oldest tile work in Islamic architecture.

=== Fortifications ===
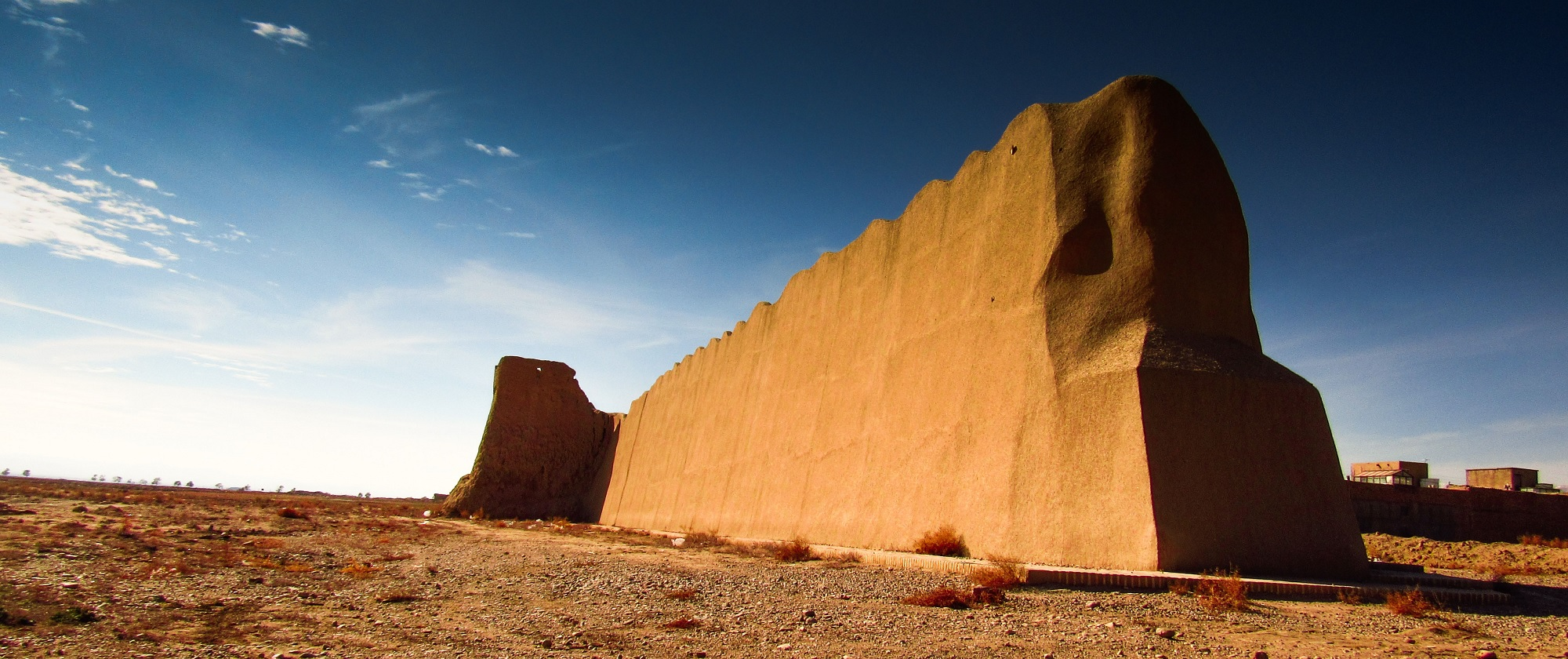
Pre-modern fortifications of Damghan

Walls or fortifications and battlements have survived in many parts in Damghan, some dating from the Sasanian era. As mentioned in the history, the wall was very wide and enabled chariots to drive over it. The remains of that wall can be seen north and south of Damghan.

=== Seljuk architecture ===
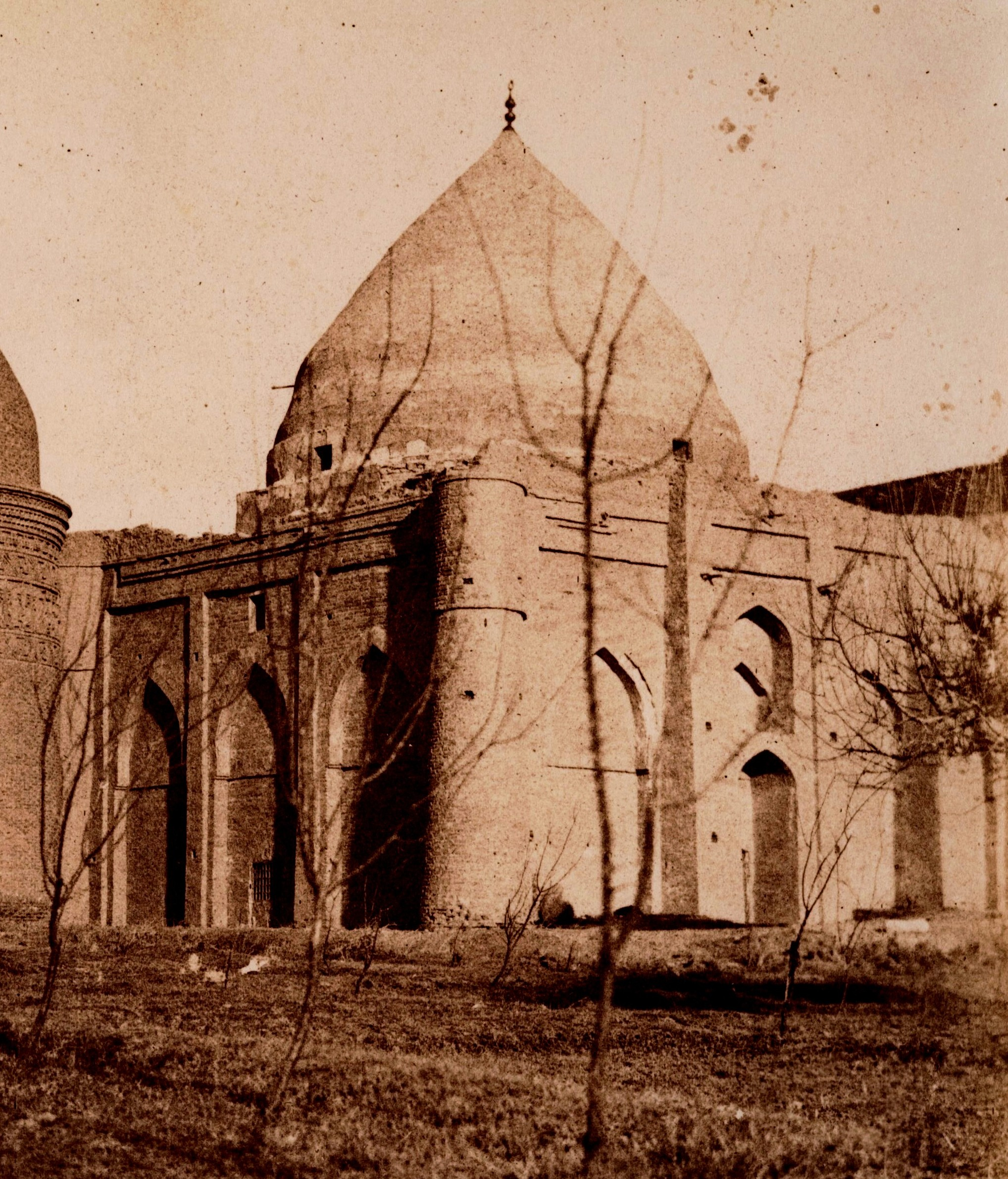
Mid-19th century photograph of the Imamzadeh Jafar Mausoleum, Damghan by Luigi Pesce.

Much treasure has survived from the Seljuk period in Damghan. Peer-e Alamdar's Shrine (The Old Flagbearer's Tomb), the congregational mosque or Masjed Jame and its minaret, the Tarikhaneh Mosque, Mansourkuh, Imamzadeh Jafar Tower and Chehel Dokhtaran mausoleum, etc. are buildings in which Islamic architecture from the Seljuk period onward is notable. For the first time in Iran these buildings carry brick decorations to compensate for the monotonous and uniform rows.

=== Gunbad-i Chihil Dukhtaran mausoleum ===
Gunbad-i Chihil Dukhtaran is a mausoleum at the centre of Damghan and behind the Imamzade Ja'far, both of which belong to the Seljuk period. It is the second-oldest tomb surviving from the reign of Tughril, the first of the Seljuk sultans. It was built by one Amir Abu Shuja Asfar, as recorded in the Kufic inscription, which says the vault was built in AH 466 (AD 1087). It has survived without cracks although the city is lying on the Alpide belt.

The vault is an onion dome adorned by bricks with artistic images and an inscription. The building which used to be a family vault is 14.8 m high and in its famous inscription the deceased have sought divine mercy in their lasting residence.

=== Imamzade Ja'far shrine-tomb ===
The Imamzade Ja'far and Muhammed is an imamzadeh of the Seljuk period.

=== Gunbad-i Pir-i Alamdar tomb ===
The Gunbad-i Pir-i Alamdar is another Seljuk-era tomb near the Masjid-i Jami.

=== Hashshashin forts ===
North of the city, along the Cheshme Ali and Mazandaran road, there are two forts built on the top of two mountains.

The first one is 5 km away from the city, on the peak of Gerdkuh, one of the main Ismaili Hashshashin fortresses once used by Hassan Sabah. It was finally conquered by the Ilkhanate under Hulagu Khan. Due to the circular shape of the mountain peak, it was named Gerdkuh, gerd for circular (round) and kuh for mountain. This shape made it very difficult to access by attackers.

Mehrnegar Fort is on Mansourkuh, 22 km north of city, along the road. The mountain is pyramidal and the fort located at its top. This was one of the fortifications of the Ismaili esoteric sect during the Seljuk invasion, and has been named Mehrnegar because of Princess Mehrnegar's love story.

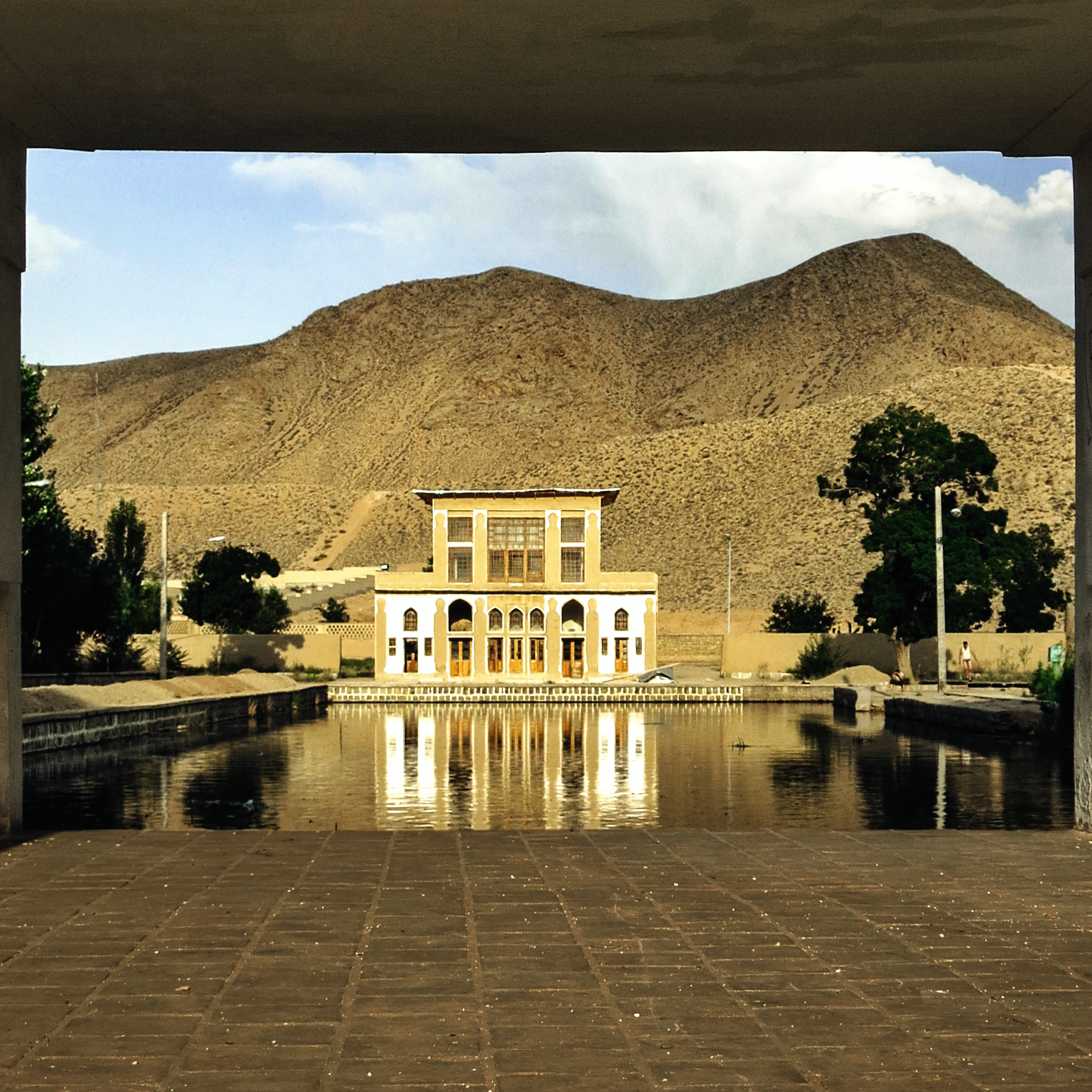
Cheshmeh-ye Ali, Semnan

=== Cheshmeh-Ali ===
Evergreen Cheshmeh-Ali is one of the permanent springs in Damghan, 30 km north of the city. Thanks to its verdant foliage and pleasant climate this region has been frequented by people from ancient times. During the Qajar period many buildings were constructed in Cheshmeh-Ali among which the Fath-Ali Shah Qajar's and Agha Mohammad Khan Qajar's palaces still stand erect. Fat'hali Shah's palace is built in the middle of an artificial pool placed between the first and second spring and Agha Mohammad Khan's palace faces the former palace opposite.

=== Other sites ===
On an eminence in the western part of the city are the ruins of a large square citadel with a small whitewashed building, called Molud Khaneh ('the house of birth'), in which Fath-Ali Shah Qajar was born (1772). Beside these, Damghan is close to the Gonbade Zangol, Toghrol's Tower, Qoosheh Amirabad Caravansary (a building from the time of Abbas the Great), historical hills and hazel-shaped castles around the city as well as Gerdkuh and Masoumzadeh Mehmandoust fortifications. Damghan's bazaar contains tombs, old schools, baths and the like. Historical monuments in Damghan have interested foreign archaeologists and many items excavated there are now in British and French museums.

== Climate ==
Damghan has a cold semi-arid climate (BSk) in the Köppen climate classification.

Climate data for Damghan (2002-2010)
| Month | Jan | Feb | Mar | Apr | May | Jun | Jul | Aug | Sep | Oct | Nov | Dec | Year |
|---|---|---|---|---|---|---|---|---|---|---|---|---|---|
| Mean daily maximum °C (°F) | 7.0 (44.6) | 11.2 (52.2) | 17.9 (64.2) | 23.1 (73.6) | 29.0 (84.2) | 34.1 (93.4) | 36.4 (97.5) | 35.1 (95.2) | 31.2 (88.2) | 25.6 (78.1) | 16.0 (60.8) | 8.5 (47.3) | 22.9 (73.3) |
| Mean daily minimum °C (°F) | −2.1 (28.2) | 1.0 (33.8) | 5.9 (42.6) | 10.6 (51.1) | 15.7 (60.3) | 19.8 (67.6) | 22.7 (72.9) | 21.4 (70.5) | 17.6 (63.7) | 12.8 (55.0) | 5.0 (41.0) | −0.6 (30.9) | 10.8 (51.5) |
| Average precipitation mm (inches) | 8.9 (0.35) | 13.7 (0.54) | 22.9 (0.90) | 22.8 (0.90) | 8.3 (0.33) | 5.4 (0.21) | 3.3 (0.13) | 2.7 (0.11) | 3.1 (0.12) | 2.2 (0.09) | 9.3 (0.37) | 13.0 (0.51) | 115.6 (4.56) |
Source: IRIMO(highs)(lows) (Precipitation)

== Notable people ==
- Manuchehri Damghani (11th century) - poet
- Ghiyath al-Din Muhammad Damghani, Sultan of Madurai (r. 1340–1344)
- Nasir al-Din Mahmud Damghani, Sultan of Madurai (r. 1344–1356)
- Hossein Qoli Khan known as Jahnsooz (1750-1777), father of Fath Ali Shah Qajar and ruler of Damghan assigned by Karim Khan
- Fath-Ali Shah Qajar (1772–1834) - shah of Persia from Qajar dynasty
- Hossein AmirAbdollahian (1343–1403) - the minister of foreign affairs
- Ahmad Mahdavi Damghani (1927–2022) - scholar of theology and literature
- Yadollah Royai (1932–2022) - poet
- The Iron Sheik (1942-2023) - Iranian-American professional wrestler Hossein Khosrow Ali Vaziri
- Hassan Sobhani (born 1953) - politician
- Ali Akbar Jalali (born 1954) - researcher of Iranian information technology sciences
- Farhad Daneshjoo (born 1955) - politician
- Kamran Daneshjoo (born 1956) - politician
- Husayn ibn Talib al-Damghani, architect-engineer, built the tomb over the grave of Muhammad ibn Ja'far in Bastam

== See also ==
- 2010 Damghan earthquake
- Battle of Damghan (1447)
- Battle of Damghan (1729)
- Cities along Silk Road
- Damghan County
- Damghan University
- Hecatompylos i.e. Hundred Gates
- List of deadliest earthquakes
- Semnan Province

Media related to Damghan at Wikimedia Commons

== Bibliography ==
- Berney, K. A. (1996). "Damghan". In Watson, Noelle (ed.). International Dictionary of Historic Places. Vol. 4. Fitzroy Dearborn. p. 766. ISBN 9781884964039.
