= Taq, Iran =

Village in Semnan province, Iran

Taq Persian: طاق
- Village
- Location within Iran
- Coordinates: 36°13′42″N 54°25′49″E
- Country: Iran
- Province: Semnan
- County: Damghan
- District: Central
- Rural District: Howmeh

Population (2016)
  - Total: 204
- Time zone: UTC+3:30 (IRST)

Taq (Persian: طاق) (Note: Also romanized as Ţāq; also known as Tak) is a village in Howmeh Rural District of the Central District in Damghan County, Semnan province,

== Demographics ==
=== Population ===
At the time of the 2006 National Census, the village's population was 231 in 72 households. The following census in 2011 counted 233 people in 100 households. The 2016 census measured the population of the village as 204 people in 74 households.
