= Damankuh Rural District =

Rural district in Semnan province, Iran

Damankuh Rural District Persian: دهستان دامنكوه
- Rural District
- Location within Iran
- Coordinates: 36°11′N 54°38′E
- Country: Iran
- Province: Semnan
- County: Damghan
- District: Central
- Established: 1987
- Capital: Mehmandust

Population (2016)
  - Total: 4,590
- Time zone: UTC+3:30 (IRST)

Damankuh Rural District (Persian: دهستان دامنكوه) is in the Central District of Damghan County, Semnan province, Iran. Its capital is the village of Mehmandust.

== Demographics ==
=== Population ===
At the time of the 2006 National Census, the rural district's population was 4,278 in 1,298 households. There were 4,045 inhabitants in 1,375 households at the following census of 2011. The 2016 census measured the population of the rural district as 4,590 in 1,595 households. The most populous of its 50 villages was Mehmandust, with 1,118 people.

=== Other villages in the rural district ===
- Abdolabad
- Emamabad
- Haddadeh
- Hoseynabad-e Dulab
- Kalateh-ye Molla
- Mehman Duyeh
- Moradabad
- Mowmenabad
- Naimabad
- Kheyr-e Qaderabad
- Shahrasazi Tazareh
- Tazareh
- Zarrinabad
