= Kalateh, Semnan =

City in Semnan province, Iran

Kalateh Persian: کلاته
- City
- Location within Iran
- Coordinates: 36°21′22″N 54°08′45″E
- Country: Iran
- Province: Semnan
- County: Damghan
- District: Central
- Established as a city: 2011

Population (2016)
  - Total: 4,611
- Time zone: UTC+3:30 (IRST)

Kalateh (Persian: کلاته) (Note: Also romanized as Kalāteh; also known as Kalateh Rudbar, also romanized as Kalāteh Rūdbār) is a city in the Central District of Damghan County, Semnan province, Iran, serving as the administrative center for Rudbar Rural District. The rural district was previously administered from the city of Dibaj. (Note: Formerly the village of Qaleh-ye Chahardeh)

== Demographics ==
=== Population ===
At the time of the 2006 National Census, the population was 2,826 in 711 households, when it was a village in Rudbar Rural District. The following census in 2011 counted 3,146 people in 881 households. The 2016 census measured the population as 4,611 people in 1,479 households, by which time the village of Kalateh had been converted to a city.
