= Battle of Damghan (1447) =

Battle of the Timurid Civil Wars

- Part of Timurid Civil Wars
Date	1447
Location	Damghan, Semnan province, Iran
Result	Tactical Timurids of Samarkand victory Strategic Timurids of Khurasan victory

Belligerents
Timurids of Khurasan	Timurids of Samarkand

Commanders and leaders
Unknown Prefect? Abul-Qasim Babur Mirza	Abdal-Latif Mirza

When Abdal-Latif Mirza reached Damghan, the prefect sealed the city and showed his opposition. After a skirmish and siege, the prince took the city by force and gave it over to general plunder. From Damghan, Abdal-Latif Mirza went to Bistam. At this city he learned of the progress made by Abul-Qasim Babur Mirza who had taken Jurjan and Mazandaran and thereby cut-off Abdal-Latif Mirza's path north to Samarkand. Abdul-Latif Mirza now had no choice but to move east arriving at Nishapur where he learned that Ala al-Dawla Mirza had taken Mashad. He was now completely encircled, he had nowhere to go. Finally he was attacked at Nishapur on 20 April 1447 by Ala al-Dawla Mirza's army and defeated.
