= Rudbar Rural District (Damghan County) =

Rural district in Semnan province, Iran

Rudbar Rural District Persian: دهستان رودبار
- Rural District
- Location within Iran
- Coordinates: 36°19′N 54°09′E
- Country: Iran
- Province: Semnan
- County: Damghan
- District: Central
- Established: 1987
- Capital: Kalateh Rudbar

Population (2016)
  - Total: 2,778
- Time zone: UTC+3:30 (IRST)

Rudbar Rural District (Persian: دهستان رودبار) is in the Central District of Damghan County, Semnan province, Iran. It is administered from the city of Kalateh. The rural district was previously administered from the city of Dibaj. (Note: Formerly the village of Qaleh-ye Chahardeh)

== Demographics ==
=== Population ===
At the time of the 2006 National Census, the rural district's population was 4,536 in 1,215 households. There were 6,052 inhabitants in 1,751 households at the following census of 2011. The 2016 census measured the population of the rural district as 2,778 in 945 households. The most populous of its 113 villages was Ahvanu, with 776 people.

=== Other villages in the rural district ===
- Agareh
- Astan
- Badeleh Kuh
- Namakeh
- Siah Pareh
- Sorkh Deh
- Tuyeh
