= Damghan University =

University in Damghan, Iran

Coordinates: 36°10′06″N 54°19′29″E

- دانشگاه دامغان
- Former name: Damghan University of Basic Sciences
- Type: Public
- Established: 1988
- Founder: Dr. Mohammad Masoud Mansuri
- Affiliations: Ministry of Science, Research, and Technology
- President: S. Saeedorreza Eslami
- Faculty: 172
- Students: 5423
- Location: Damghan, Semnan Province, Iran
- Campus: Urban
- Website: du.ac.ir/en

Damghan University, also written as The University of Damghan (Persian: دانشگاه دامغان, romanized: Daneshgah-e Damghan), is a public university located in the city of Damghan, Semnan province, Iran.

Housing almost the entirety of the educational, recreational, and housing facilities, Damghan University’s campus is located in a relatively idle part of town. Despite being among the younger universities in Iran, factors such as the hosting of a variety of majors and minors in the fields of basic sciences, engineering, humanities, and liberal art have contributed to Damghan University’s academic growth.

== History ==
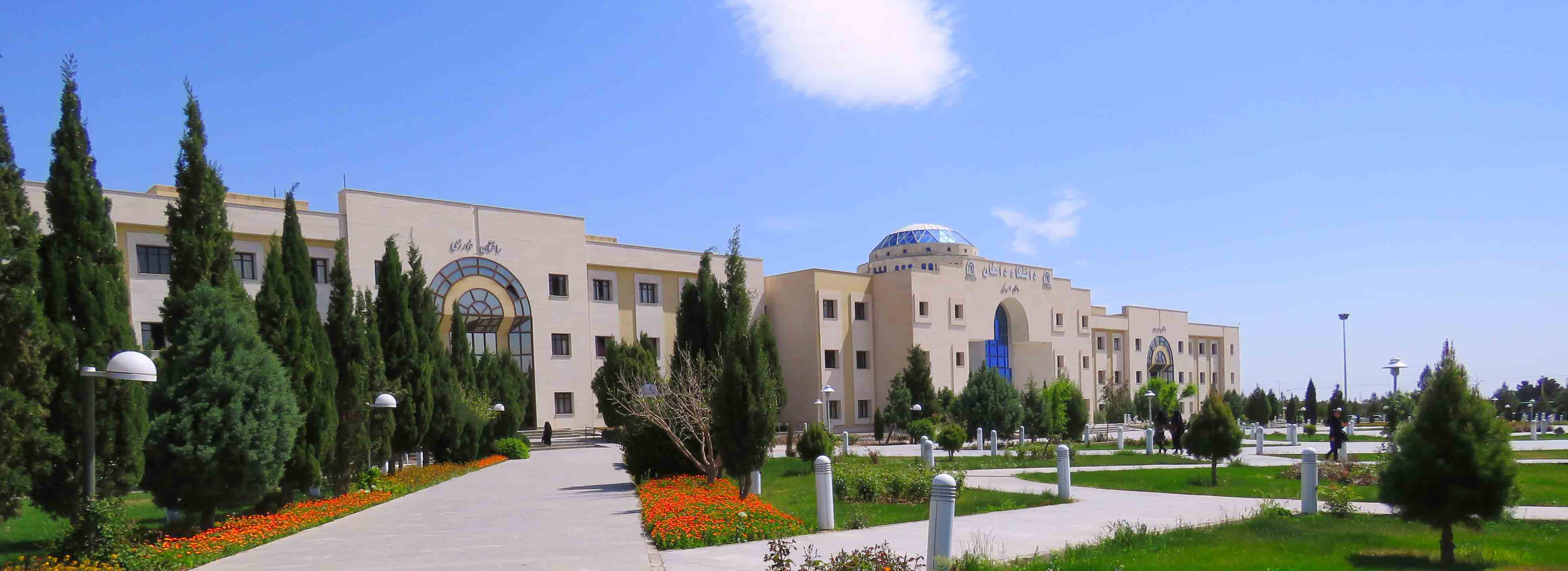
Damghan University

Damghan University Main Entrance

Damghan University, initially entitled “Damghan School of Basic Sciences” was established in 1988 through public funding, with Aliasghar Naderi as its instigator and president. The academic activities of the school began four years later in 1992, with the enrollment of 35 bachelor’s students in the field of geology. More majors in bachelor's, master's, and Ph.D. levels including Teaching of Mathematics, Applied Mathematics, Pure Mathematics, Chemistry, Physics, General Biology, and Computer Sciences were gradually added in later years. The promotion of Damghan School of Basic Sciences to Damghan University of Basic Sciences was approved by the Higher Education Development Council on 10 September 2002.

Damghan University of Basic Sciences was later promoted to Damghan University on 25 April 2010 with the approval of the Higher Education Development Council. To reflect the promotion, the establishment of three new schools of Engineering, Art, and Humanities was added to the agenda. Damghan University houses 8 schools including the School of Earth Sciences, School of Chemistry, School of Physics, School of Biology, School of Humanities, School of Engineering, and School of Art. The University has 172 faculty members, 5423 students in bachelor's, master's, and Ph.D. levels, and 68 majors and minors combined.

According to Iran’s higher education system, Damghan University can be classified as a “public” university, as it receives a majority of its budget through government funds. As such, the admission process is done — as with any other public university in Iran — through the biannual National Entrance Exam.

== Schools ==
=== The School of Earth Sciences ===
The School of Earth Sciences formed the first educational program at the onset of Damghan University’s establishment. The School of Earth Sciences, initially known as the Department of Geology, officially commenced its activities with the enrollment of 35 students. Though the faculty’s focus was on Pure Geology, the Applied Geology major was also added in 2008. Enrollment for Applied Geology ended in 2012 when it was replaced with Geomorphology. The School currently has a total of 21 faculty members, including 14 assistant and 7 associate professors, and a total of 255 students, including 35 Master’s and 230 Bachelor’s students. The school, moreover, features a range of laboratories and workshops in the fields of Sedimentology, Experimental Tectonics, Fluid Inclusions, and Stratigraphy.

- Students can currently enroll in the following majors:

Bachelor’s	Geography	Geology				
Master’s	Petrology	Stratigraphy and Paleontology	Tectonics	Engineering Geology	Economic Geology	Mineralogy and Industrial Minerals

=== School of Mathematics and Computer Science ===
The School of Mathematics and Computer Science at Damghan University officially commenced its activities under the “Faculty of Mathematics” moniker in 1994, admitting students in the majors of Applied Mathematics and Teaching of Mathematics. In 1999, the first bachelor’s students were enrolled and commenced their studies in Pure Mathematics, with master’s students beginning in the year 2000. The Faculty of Computer Sciences was also launched in the same year, leading to the establishment of the School of Mathematics and Computer Science, encompassing the faculties of mathematics and computer science. The School currently has a total of 26 faculty members, including 1 professor, 6 associate professors, 17 assistant professors, and 2 instructors.

- Students can currently enroll in the following majors:

Pure Mathematics	Applied Mathematics	Computer Sciences

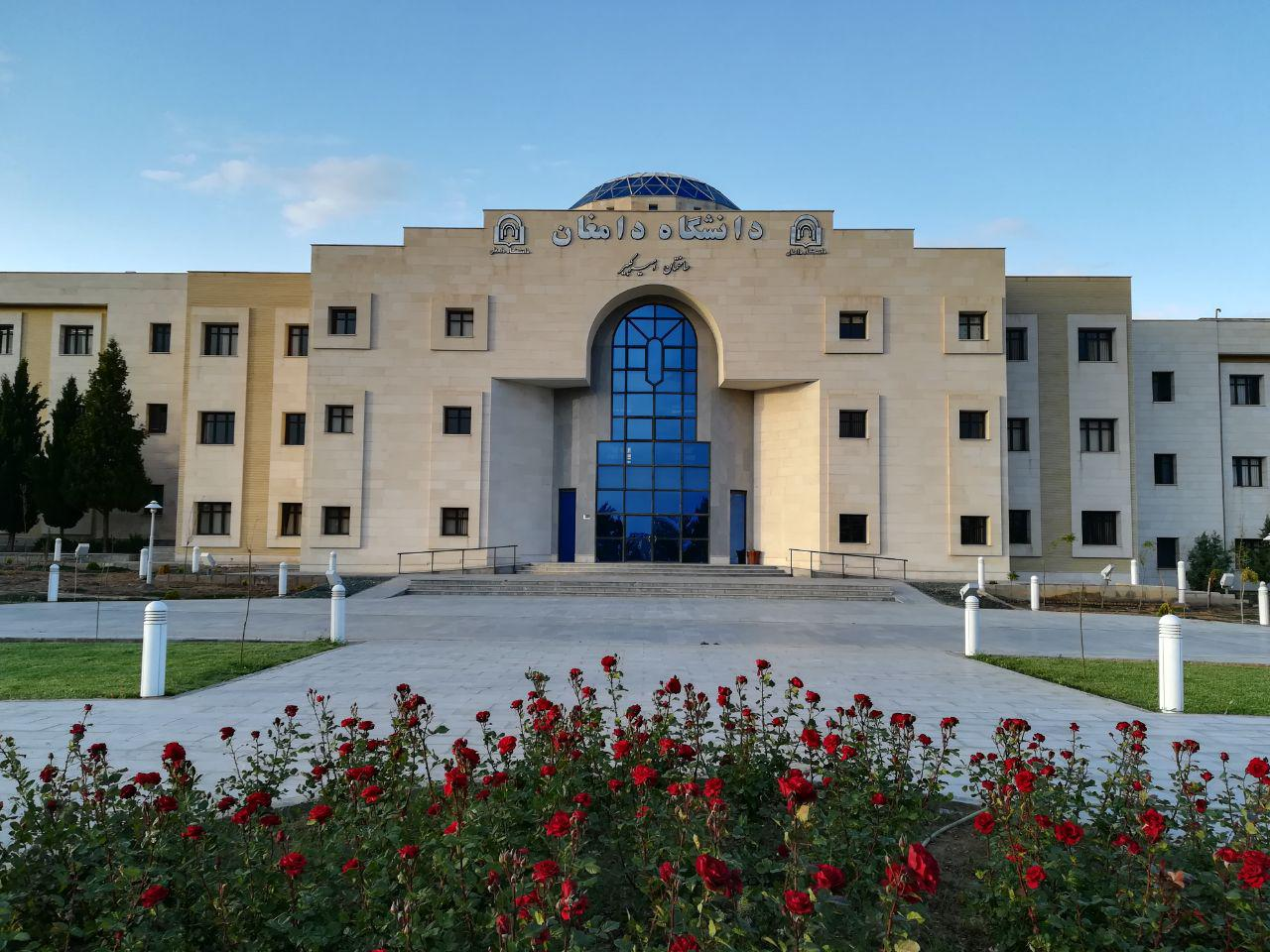
Damghan University Main Educational Facilities (Left to right: Kharazmi, Amir Kabir, and Aboureyhan buildings)

=== School of Chemistry ===
Damghan University’s School of Chemistry was founded in 1994 and started its first undergraduate program in Pure Chemistry. Currently, the School of Chemistry offers two undergraduate majors in Pure Chemistry and Applied Chemistry, 6 graduate programs in Analytical Chemistry, Physical Chemistry, Organic Chemistry, Inorganic Chemistry, Applied Chemistry, and Polymer Chemistry, and four PhD programs in Analytical Chemistry, Physical Chemistry, Organic Chemistry, and Inorganic Chemistry. The school has a total of 23 faculty members, including 10 associate professors, 4 assistant professors, and 4 professors.

- The following is a list of departments in the School of Chemistry of Damghan University:

Applied Chemistry	Pharmaceutical and Analytical Chemistry	Pure and Inorganic Chemistry	Environmental, Organic, and Polymer Chemistry	Information Technology in Chemistry and Physical Chemistry

Additionally, the faculty includes both educational and research laboratories. Research laboratories such as the ICP and FT-IR Analytical Labs, as well as Thermal and Elemental Research Labs, are among the research facilities available at the School of Chemistry.

=== School of Physics ===
The School of Physics at Damghan University started its first undergraduate program in 1996. The school offers two undergraduate programs in the fields of Physics and Engineering Physics, five graduate programs in the fields of Solid State Physics, Astronomy and Astrophysics, Nuclear Physics, Gravitation and Cosmology, and Nanophysics, and three PhD programs in the fields of Condensed Matter Physics (Solid State), Nuclear Physics, and Nanophysics. The school has a total of 22 faculty members, including 2 professors, 16 assistant professors, and 4 associate professors.

- There are three faculties currently active in the School of Physics:

Solid State Physics	Astronomy and Astrophysics	Nuclear and Particle Physics

Among the facilities available at the Faculty of Physics are an observatory, educational laboratories, and research laboratories. The research laboratories include:

1. Nuclear Physics Laboratory
2. Nanophysics and Solid State Research Laboratory
3. Scanning Probe Microscopy (SPM) Laboratory
4. Scattering and Characterization of Nanomaterials Laboratory

=== School of Biology ===
The School of Biology — among the newer schools at the University of Damghan — officially began its educational and research programs in February 2007 by admitting students in three majors of Plant Sciences, General Biology, and Cellular Molecular Biology. The school currently offers three bachelor’s programs in the fields of Animal Biology, Cellular and Molecular Biology, and Plant Sciences, five master’s programs in the fields of Plant Physiology, Systematic Ecology, Evolutionary Biology, Animal Physiology, and Biochemistry, and one PhD program in the field of Animal Physiology. The school currently has a total of 16 faculty members, which includes 11 assistant professors and 5 associate professors.

- There are three departments at the School of Biology:

Plant Biology	Animal Biology	Cellular and Molecular Biology

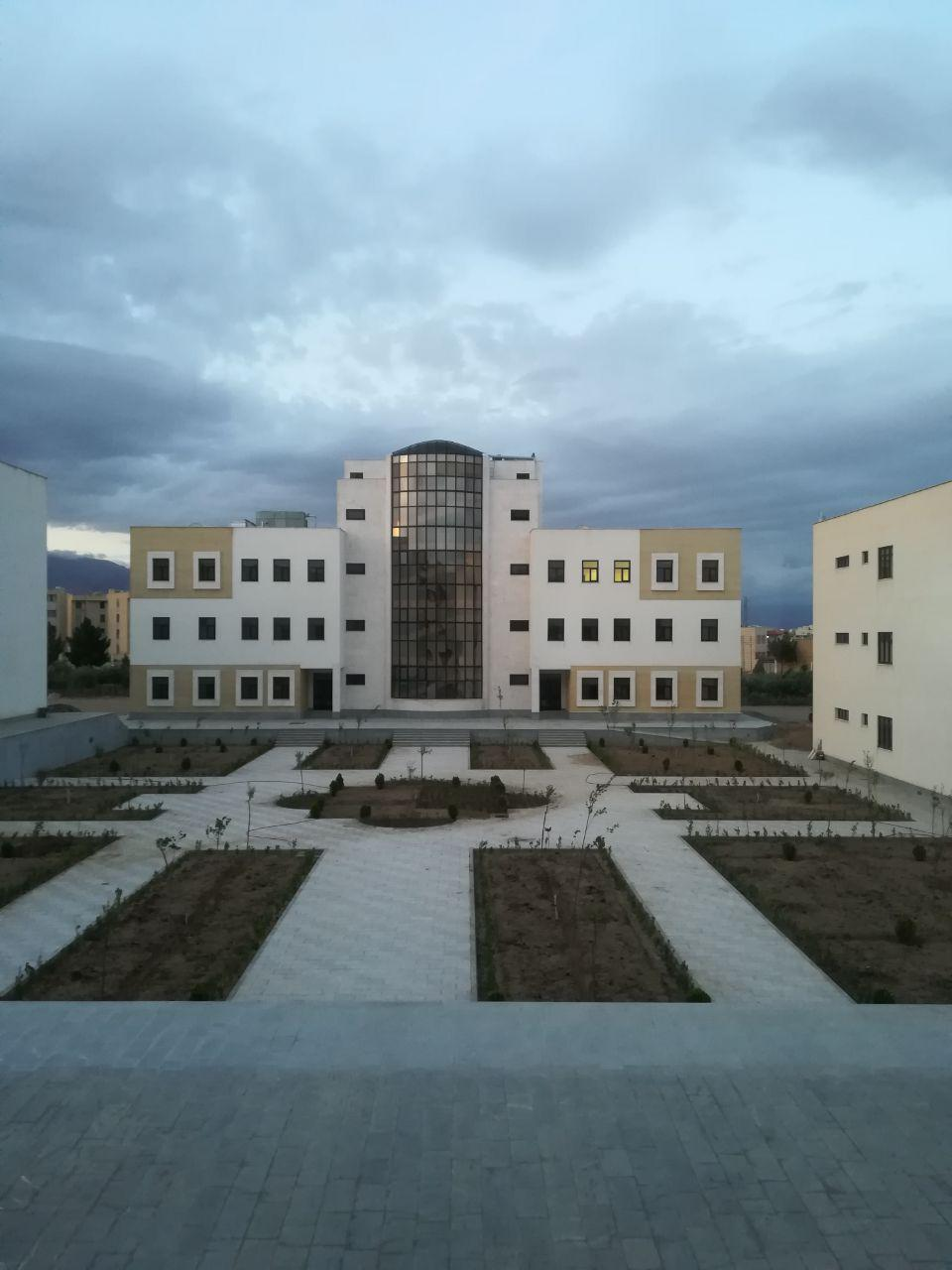
Damghan University's Ibn Sina building, dedicated to the School of Biology

Moreover, the following is a list of laboratories and equipment within the School:

1. Botany Laboratory
2. Plant Physiology Laboratory
3. Cellular and Molecular Biology Laboratory
4. Animal Physiology Laboratory
5. Microscopy Laboratory
6. Cell and Tissue Culture Laboratory
7. Electrophysiology Laboratory

=== School of Engineering ===
The establishment of a school of engineering was made possible with the approval of the Higher Education Development Council in 2010, which paved the way for the transformation of the Damghan University of Basic Sciences into the University of Damghan. The admission of the first students in the school began in 2011 in the fields of Software Engineering and Industrial Engineering. The School currently has a total of 31 faculty members, including 5 associate professors, 23 assistant professors, and 3 instructors. Moreover, the school houses 860 undergraduate students studying in five departments of Computer Software Engineering, Industrial Engineering, Electrical Engineering, Civil Engineering, and Mechanical Engineering. Recently, a master's level minor in power engineering was also added to the department of Electrical Engineering.

- Damghan University’s School of Engineering Faculties:

Computer Engineering	Industrial Engineering	Electrical Engineering	Civil Engineering	Mechanical Engineering	Chemical Engineering

The School of Engineering is among the most equipped within the University, featuring necessary software for the respective fields, workshops for Electrical Engineering fundamentals, Electrical Circuit Workshops, Logic Circuit Workshop, educational laboratories, and research laboratories. The research laboratories also branch into the following:

1. Renewable Energy Laboratory
2. Advanced Production Research Laboratories
3. Modeling, Melting, and Casting Workshop
4. Power System Protection Laboratory
5. Advanced Surface Engineering Laboratory
6. Composite and Advanced Materials Laboratory

=== School of Arts ===
Coinciding with the decision of The Council of Higher Education Development to rename Damghan University of Basic Sciences to Damghan University, the establishment of the School of Arts was also approved. The establishment of the school and the development of its educational program was the result of an agreement between Damghan University and the Educational and Research Deputy of the Islamic Republic of Iran Broadcasting (IRIB). The mutual cultural, educational, and research agreement between the two institutes resulted in the establishment of five undergraduate programs:

1. Dramatic Literature
2. Television and Digital Arts
3. Cinema Studies
4. Acting and Directing
5. Television Directing

The school currently has a total of 9 faculty members in the following departments:

Dramatic Literature	Television and Digital Arts	Cinema

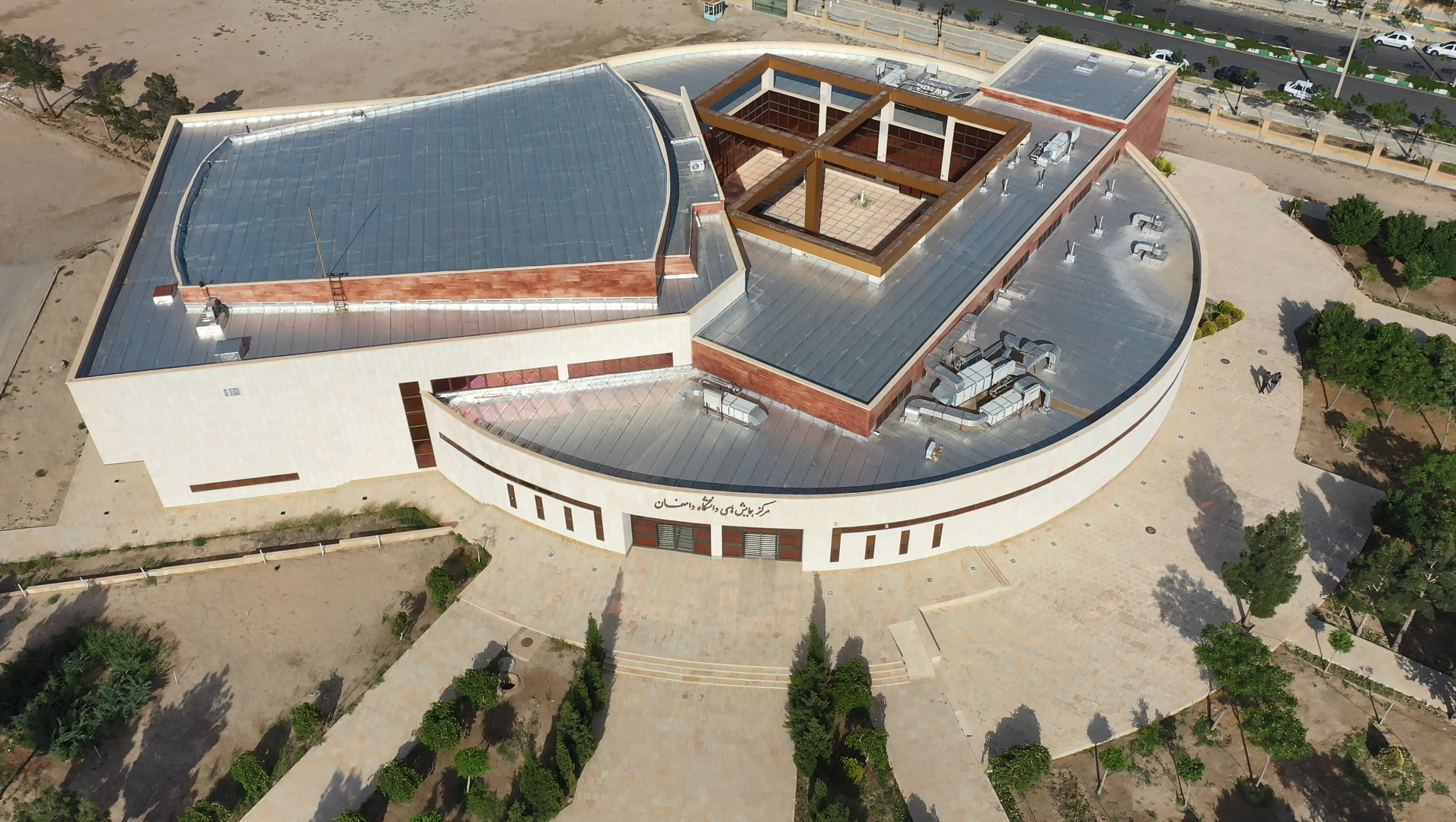
An aerial image of Damghan University's Main Event Hub

Due to the requirements of the liberal arts majors, the School of art is among the most equipped within the university with seven workshops:

1. Photography Workshop
2. Visual Content Creation Workshop
3. 2D Animation Workshop
4. Computer Workshop
5. Puppet Animation Workshop
6. General Design Workshop
7. Animation Design Workshop

=== School of Humanities ===
The School of Humanities officially commenced its activities in 2013 by admitting students to the Master's program in Islamic Jurisprudence and Criminal Law. Subsequently, in 2016, undergraduate programs were introduced in Sports Sciences, Geography, and Law, and a master's program in Arabic Translation. In 2017, programs in English Language and Economics were also added to the faculty's offerings.

The School focuses on a range of disciplines aimed at providing comprehensive education in humanities and social sciences. Among its facilities are the Civic Law Clinic, Sports Science Laboratory, and Language Laboratory. The following is a list of the departments within the school:

Department of Law and Jurisprudence	Department of Economics	Department of Sports Education	Department of General Studies	Department of Religious Studies	Department of Arabic Language Translation	Department of English Language Translation

== Facilities ==
=== Academic Facilities ===
==== Incubation Center ====
Damghan University’s Incubation Center is an economic office, established in 2022, which supports startups with entrepreneurial spirit with the preparation of general facilities and administrative procedures.

==== Library ====
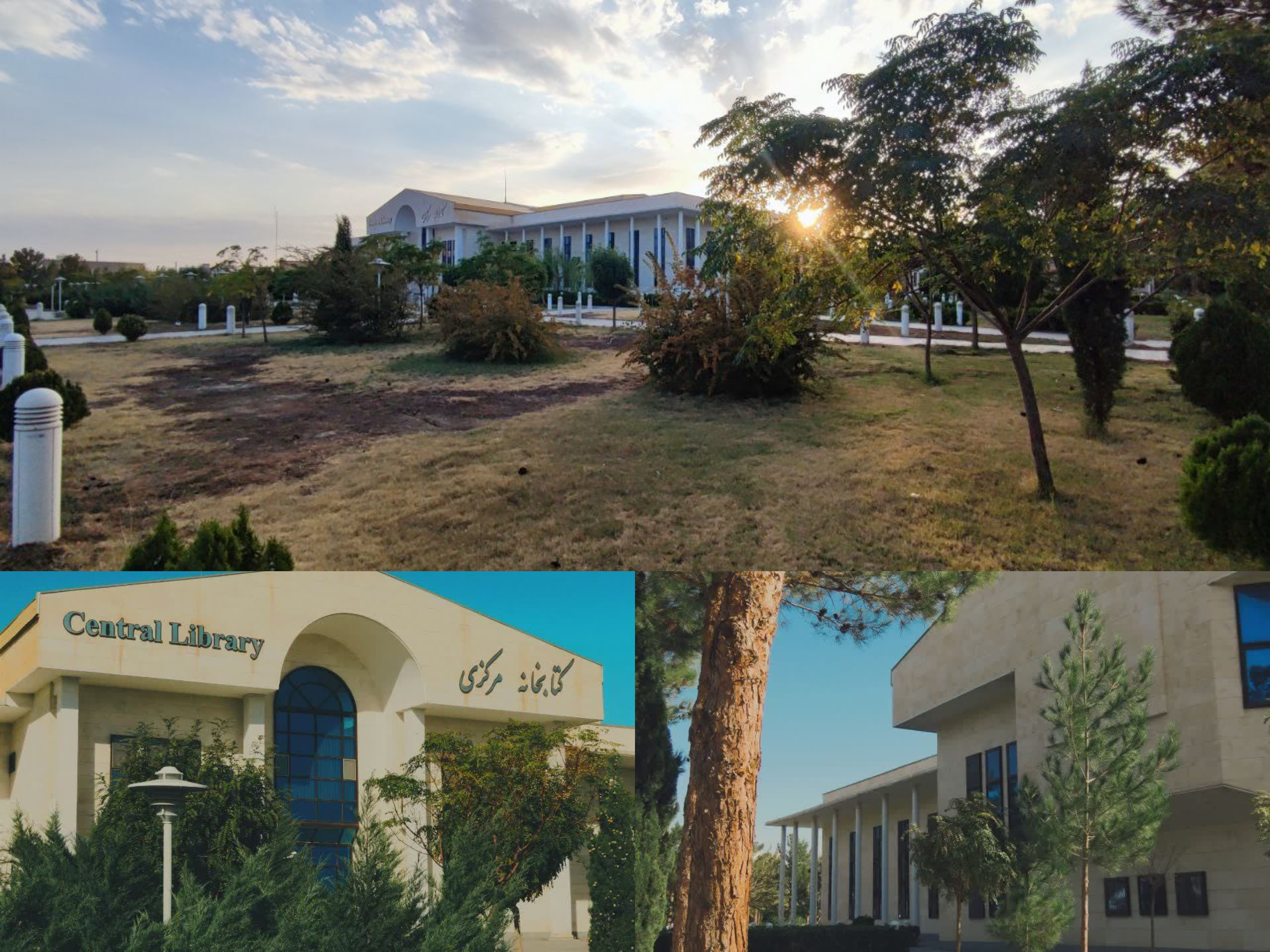
The Central Library of Damghan University

Damghan University’s Central Library was established in 1989, coinciding with the launch of the Geology program at the university. The library started its operations with a collection of over three thousand books and ten journal titles (both Persian and Latin). In 2009, the project for a new Central Library building began with improved properties. The new site was inaugurated in the presence of the then Minister of Science, Research, and Technology, Dr. Kamran Daneshjou. As of the end of May 2022, the Central Library of Damghan University amassed a collection of over 61,240 Persian books, 9,000 Latin books, 250 journal titles (both Persian and Latin), and 2,170 thesis titles in both electronic and physical versions.

==== Pistachio Innovation Center ====
The Pistachio Innovation Center of Damghan, overseen by Damghan University, stands as the pioneering hub dedicated to the entire lifecycle of pistachio cultivation, and encompasses processing and advanced scientific research.

Beyond its core mission in pistachio agriculture, the center extends its influence across various domains including processing techniques that enhance quality and shelf life, health-related research to promote the nutritional benefits of pistachios, and initiatives in industrial tourism and cultural heritage that celebrate the region's pistachio industry.

The center also emphasizes marketing and sales strategies to bolster the market presence of pistachio products domestically and internationally. Environmental awareness is another concern, where the center integrates sustainable practices and conducts research on eco-friendly farming methods to minimize environmental impact and preserve natural resources.

==== Institute of Biological Sciences ====
The establishment of the Institute of Biological Sciences at Damghan University was approved by the Council of Higher Education Development on 2 July 2011. This institute comprises four research groups: The Cellular and Molecular Biology Research Group, the Physiology Research Group, the Plant Sciences Research Group, and the Biochemistry Research Group. The institute aims to conduct demand-driven and applied research projects in the fields of biology and regenerative medicine, including stem cell biology, neurobiology, and herbal medicines.

=== Student Amenities ===
A majority of the dormitories are located on campus. The University has 5 dormitories for female and 2 dormitories for male students, accommodating more than 1500 students in total.

== Publications ==
The Damghan University Press is in charge of publishing books and journals dedicated to the publishing of latest research by faculty members. As of February 2024, Damghan University Press has published more than 70 titles, focused on a wide variety of subjects in the fields of geology, mathematics and computer science, basic sciences, and liberal arts and humanities.

=== Journals ===
Damghan University Press oversees the publishing of articles in the academic journals belonging to the university. The following is a list of Damghan University Press’ Journals currently active:

1. Global Analysis and Discrete Mathematics
2. Iranian Journal of Astronomy and Astrophysics
3. Journal of Holography Applications in Physics
4. Journal of Nano Magnetism
5. Journal of Nano Simulation
6. Journal of Neurobiology Research
7. Materials Chemistry Horizons

== Honors and Achievements ==
- Ranked 8th among Iranian leading higher education institutions based on the Nature-Index ranking in 2023.

== Admission of International Students ==
Damghan University obtained permission to admit international students from the Ministry of Science, Research, and Technology in 2023. The majority of these students are from Iraq.

== See also ==
- Higher Education in Iran
