= Shahr-i Gholghola =

Historical and archaeological site in Afghanistan

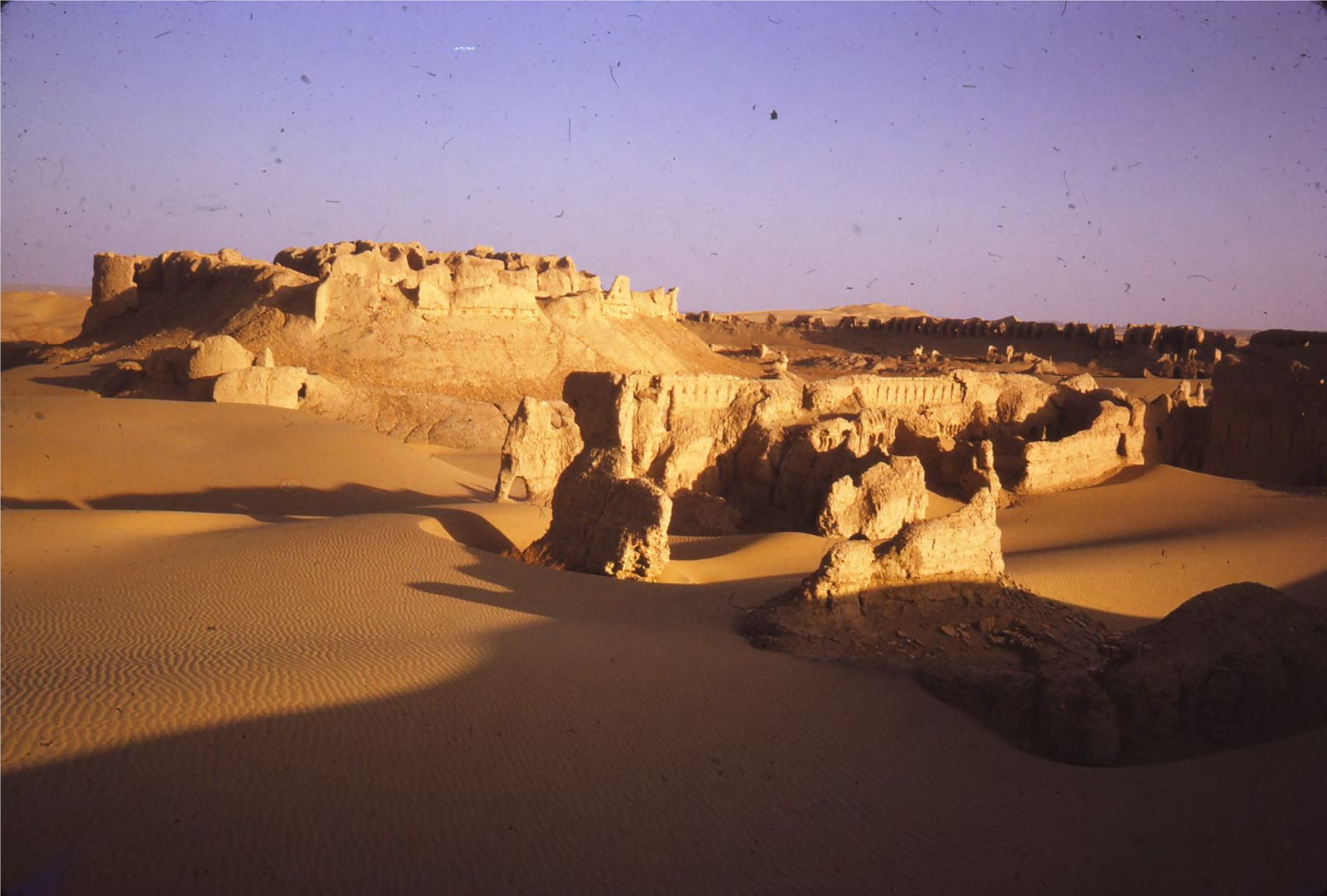
- Shahr-i Gholghola 1974, photo by Robert K. Vincent Jr.

- Location of the Shahr-i Gholghola
- 30°34′36″N 62°05′26″E
- Location: Nimroz Province, Afghanistan

Shahr-i Gholghola (Persian: شهر غلغله) (City of Screams), also called Sar-o-Tar. is a historical, archaeological site located in Nimroz Province of the Sistan region, which presently encompasses parts of Iran, Afghanistan, and Pakistan. The ruin might be the fortress city of Taq, known from medieval Islamic sources.

Shahr-i Gholghola was the land of the Saka people of Sistan, who inhabited this area in the last two centuries BCE. This land may derive its name from these people.

Nowadays, there is no attention paid to the protection and rehabilitation of historical sites in Nimroz Province by relevant authorities, and this causes almost all historical monuments, including the city of Gholghola, to be on the verge of destruction.

== History ==
This city was built for the first time perhaps in the Achaemenid period, but, over time, its monuments have been destroyed by various natural and unnatural factors.

The Helmand Sistan Project, a joint American and Afghan archaeological research team in this region that worked from 1971 to 1979, explored the standing monuments of this site that date from the Islamic period in the Sistan and were built by the Saffarid kings in the 9th or early 10th century. In addition to the Citadel and its palace, they include a mosque, a bazaar, and a caravanserai to the north of the Citadel and a neighborhood of elaborate houses in the east. Excavations of the Citadel by archaeologists showed that the standing monuments were built on large public buildings of pre-Islamic periods in this region, one Sasanian and another Parthian beneath. The three-storied Citadel Palace is perhaps the only known monumental Saffarid building extant. It is unusual in its design with a serpentine outer wall of baked brick, non-squared corners, and a location at the eastern edge of the Citadel rather than the center. The Saffarid buildings were reused in the Ghaznavid and Ghurid periods, and some changes were made in them, including the addition of a bathhouse on the Citadel and an expansive Lower Palace in the enclosure beneath, until they were destroyed by Genghis Khan's army in 1222. The date of the conquest is confirmed by a set of coin hoards sequestered along the bazaar uncovered by the archaeologists from that date. During the period of Timur Lang, this area witnessed wars and was destroyed, but the successors of Timur also built or restored some buildings. The remains of this period were very few and mainly included mansion houses and canals built inside the outer defensive walls, which had gone out of use.

== Key buildings and areas of the site ==
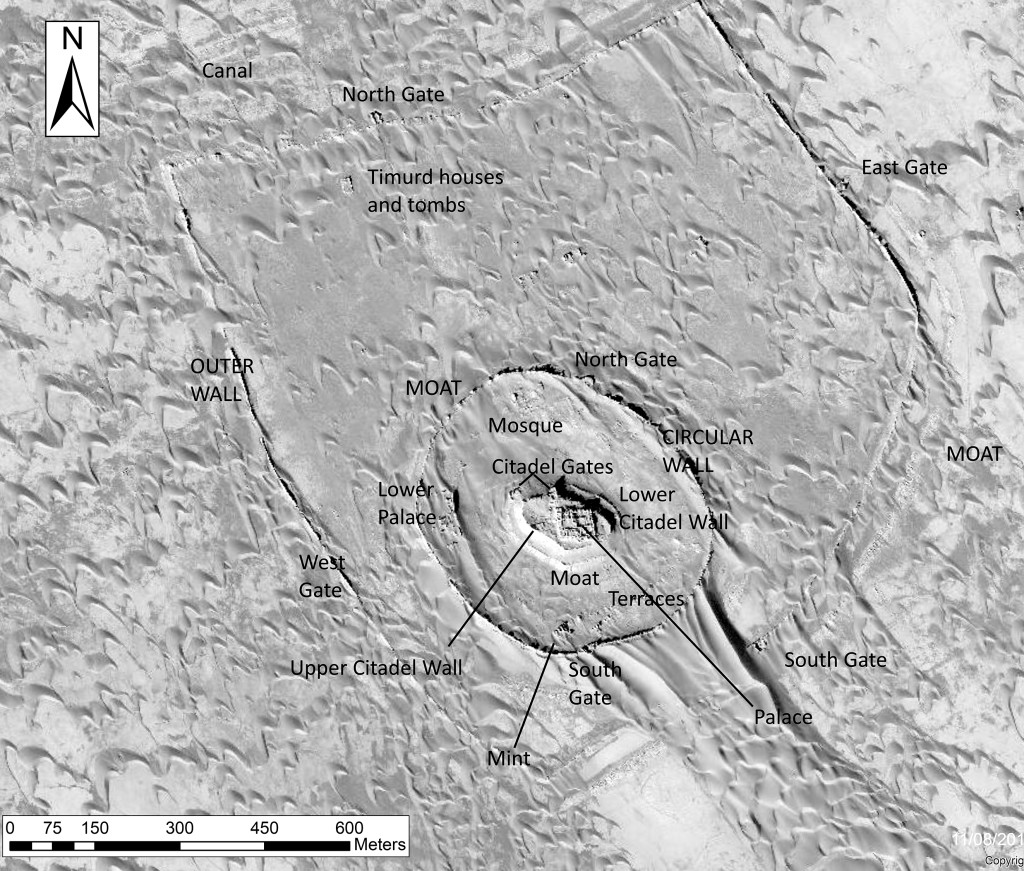
Satellite view of Shahr-i Gholghola by AHMP project, University of Chicago.

The structure of the city is such that there are standing walls over 1 km in length and over 10 m high on each side. Also, there were three moats and five different wall systems to further protect the city and the main palace of the citadel at the center of the site.

=== Citadel Palace ===
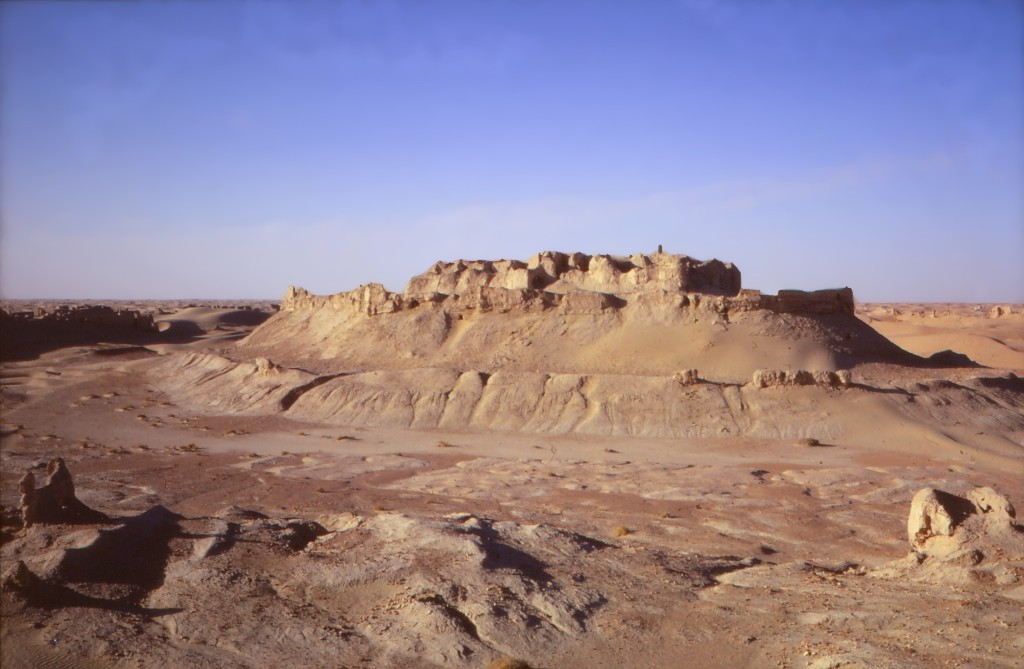
The Citadel Palace held a commanding view of the region.

According to the findings of the Afghan-American archaeological research team led by Mitchell Allen, an American archaeologist, in 1974, they found that along the foundation of the western wall of the palace, this building stands above the previous public buildings from the Sassanid and Parthian times, and 1000 Adds another year to the history of the citadel. In their several years of research in this place, the mentioned team found that the clay decorative elements used in the architecture lacked the elaborate designs of the constructions of Mahmud Ghaznavi and his successors in the 11th and 12th centuries AD. And according to the team, this indicates that the palace was built slightly earlier than that, making it the only known example of 10th-century Saffarid architecture.

=== Bathhouse ===
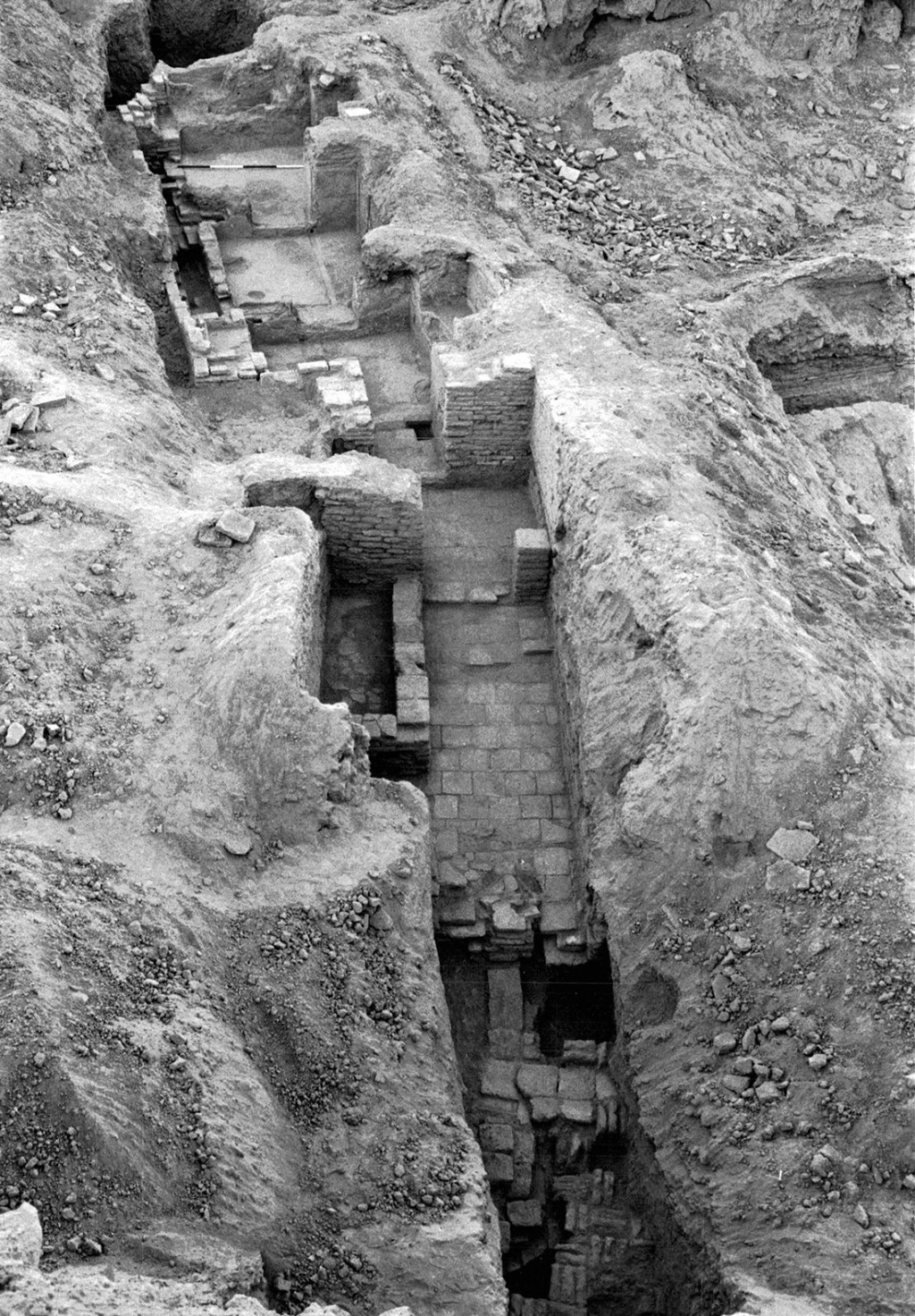
The earliest level of the bathhouse west of the Palace.

In the western part of the citadel, there was a bathroom, which was made of baked bricks and coated with plaster, and was approximately 30 meters long. As a result of the discoveries of the archeology team led by Mitchell Allen, this place (bathroom) had two entrance corridors that led to cold, warm, and hot rooms. At the western end, there was a water tank and a furnace for heating water. The bath rooms were made of Ghaznavid-era ceramics, heavily plastered, and had alcoves with benches for seating. According to the archeology team, the bathhouse was rebuilt later, probably during the Timurid era, with a higher floor and new underground channels.

=== Mosque and Bazaar ===
In this place, a historical mosque was discovered in 1972 by the Helmand Sistan Project team, which was built during the Saffarid period. Per the Helmand Sistan Project team statement, this mosque has a qibla wall and mihrab on the west side, a porch on the east, and a central courtyard built with baked bricks. The southern entrance of the mosque opened onto a commercial street that contained a bazaar area and has been rebuilt several times in different periods. A caravanserai was found across the street from the mosque. This mosque was also destroyed during the attack of Genghis Khan's soldiers.

== Irrigation system ==
The Shahr-i Gholghola was irrigated by the Zarkan and Zorkan canals, which were separated from Helmand River and went towards Chekhansur and Kang.

During the Islamic period, most diversion and storage dams were built in Sistan and Hirmand valley, which shows the skill and ability of Sistanis in water management. Mirabi system has also been very strong in Sistan. Bandabafan and Mir Aban Sistani were experts in knowing the longitudinal slope of the streams Sistan was attacked several times by its enemies, and all its irrigation systems were destroyed. One of the most violent of them was the invasion of the Mongols in 620 A.H., and the last blow was given by Timur Lang to the body of Sistan, who in 785 A.H. besieged the city of Zaranj with his vast army and later destroyed it completely. Timur destroyed the entire irrigation system and turned the most prosperous land, which was called the granary of the region, into ruins. Ghurids (Sultan Aladdin), Mongols and Timurids (Timur Lang and later Shah Rukh Mirza) played a major role in destroying the irrigation system of Sistan, and Sistan never returned to its former glory and prosperity.

== See also ==
- Shahr-e Ghulghulah, geonames
- Ajar in Sar-O-Tar: Parthian Storage Facilities in Ancient Sistan - Mitchell Allen, YouTube.
