= Ahvanu =

Village in Semnan province, Iran

Ahvanu Persian: اهوانو
- Village
- Location within Iran
- Coordinates: 36°13′47″N 54°10′48″E
- Country: Iran
- Province: Semnan
- County: Damghan
- District: Central
- Rural District: Rudbar

Population (2016)
  - Total: 776
- Time zone: UTC+3:30 (IRST)

Ahvanu (Persian: اهوانو) (Note: Also romanized as Āhevānū, Ahovanoo, and Āhvānū; also known as Ayānu and Eynū) is a village in Rudbar Rural District of the Central District in Damghan County, Semnan province, Iran.

== Demographics ==
=== Population ===
At the time of the 2006 National Census, the village's population was 606 in 172 households. The following census in 2011 counted 650 people in 182 households. The 2016 census measured the population of the village as 776 people in 270 households, the most populous in its rural district.
