= Howmeh Rural District (Damghan County) =

Rural district in Semnan province, Iran

Howmeh Rural District Persian: دهستان حومه
- Rural District
- Location within Iran
- Coordinates: 36°12′N 54°22′E
- Country: Iran
- Province: Semnan
- County: Damghan
- District: Central
- Established: 1987
- Capital: Qaleh-ye Pain Baram

Population (2016)
  - Total: 5,162
- Time zone: UTC+3:30 (IRST)

Howmeh Rural District (Persian: دهستان حومه) is in the Central District of Damghan County, Semnan province, Iran. Its capital is the village of Qaleh-ye Pain Baram.

== Demographics ==
=== Population ===
At the time of the 2006 National Census, the rural district's population was 4,318 in 1,261 households. There were 3,854 inhabitants in 1,302 households at the following census of 2011. The 2016 census measured the population of the rural district as 5,162 in 1,778 households. The most populous of its 92 villages was Jazan, with 1,818 people.

=== Other villages in the rural district ===
- Baq
- Firuzabad
- Hajjiabad-e Bostijian
- Heydarabad
- Hoseynabad-e Hajji Ali Naqi
- Mayan
- Taq
- Vamarzan
