= Ali Akbar Jalali =

Iranian Computer Scientist

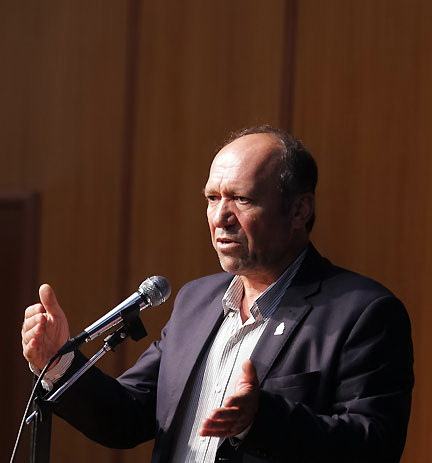
- Ali Akbar Jalali at the entrance celebration of the new Iran University of Science and Technology
- Born: Ali Akbar Jalali; November 22, 1954 (age 71); Shahkooh, Shahroud
- Other names: Father of Information Technology in Iran
- Years active: 1994 - present

Ali Akbar Jalali (Persian: علی‌اکبر جلالی), born on November 22, 1954, in Shahroud, Iran, is a computer scientist, university lecturer and researcher of Iranian information technology sciences. He is one of the first people who played a role in the development of the Internet in the villages of Iran, and for this reason, he is also called the "father of information technology in Iran".

== Career and research ==
Jalali has served on the faculty of the Iran University of Science and Technology (IUST) since the 1990s, working on campus IT initiatives and advising on national ICT programs. In the early 2000s he helped launch an “Internet village” project in Shahkooh (Golestan Province), a pilot highlighted in contemporary reporting for bringing connectivity and basic computer training to rural residents. Aspects of these rural ICT efforts were later discussed in policy and research studies on the socio-economic effects of ICT in Iranian villages.

Jalali’s publications span control systems and applications of ICT. They include a study co-authored with Mohammad-Reza Okhovvat and Morteza Okhovvat proposing a tailored model for rural e-commerce adoption in Iran.
