= Central District (Damghan County) =

District in Semnan province, Iran

Central District (Damghan County) Persian: بخش مرکزی شهرستان دامغان
- District
- Location within Iran
- Coordinates: 36°11′N 54°20′E
- Country: Iran
- Province: Semnan
- County: Damghan
- Capital: Damghan

Population (2016)
  - Total: 81,894
- Time zone: UTC+3:30 (IRST)

The Central District of Damghan County (Persian: بخش مرکزی شهرستان دامغان) is in Semnan province, Iran. Its capital is the city of Damghan.

== History ==
The village of Kalateh was converted to a city in 2011.

== Demographics ==
=== Population ===
At the time of the 2006 National Census, the district's population was 72,967 in 20,303 households. The following census in 2011 counted 76,495 people in 22,447 households. The 2016 census measured the population of the district as 81,894 inhabitants in 26,174 households.

=== Administrative divisions ===
Central District (Damghan County) Population
Administrative Divisions	2006	2011	2016
Damankuh RD	4,278	4,045	4,590
Howmeh RD	4,318	3,854	5,162
Rudbar RD	4,536	6,052	2,778
Damghan (city)	57,331	58,770	59,106
Dibaj (city)	2,504	3,774	5,647
Kalateh (city)			4,611
Total	72,967	76,495	81,894
RD = Rural District
