= Mohammadabad-e Gazuiyeh =

Village in Kerman province, Iran

Mohammadabad-e Gazuiyeh Persian: محمدابادگزوئيه
- Village
- Location within Iran
- Coordinates: 29°47′28″N 56°41′44″E
- Country: Iran
- Province: Kerman
- County: Bardsir
- District: Negar
- Rural District: Negar

Population (2016)
  - Total: 0
- Time zone: UTC+3:30 (IRST)

Mohammadabad-e Gazuiyeh (Persian: محمدابادگزوئيه) (Note: Also romanized as Moḩammadābād-e Gazū’īyeh; also known as Moḩammadābād) is a village in Negar Rural District of Negar District, Bardsir County, Kerman province, Iran.

== Demographics ==
=== Population ===
At the time of the 2006 National Census, the village's population was 12 in seven households, when it was in the Central District of Bardsir County. The village did not appear in the following census of 2011, by which time the rural district had been separated from the district in the formation of Negar District. The 2016 census measured the population of the village as zero.
