= Narp Rural District =

Rural district in Kerman province, Iran

Narp Rural District Persian: دهستان نارپ
- Rural District
- Location within Iran
- Coordinates: 29°48′02″N 56°41′17″E
- Country: Iran
- Province: Kerman
- County: Bardsir
- District: Negar
- Capital: Narp

Population (2016)
  - Total: 6,112
- Time zone: UTC+3:30 (IRST)

Narp Rural District (Persian: دهستان نارپ) is in Negar District of Bardsir County, Kerman province, Iran. Its capital is the village of Narp.

== History ==
After the 2006 National Census, Negar Rural District, and later the city of Negar, were separated from the Central District in the establishment of Negar District, which was divided into two rural districts, including the new Narp Rural District.

== Demographics ==
=== Population ===
At the time of the 2011 census, the rural district's population was 6,100 in 1,468 households. The 2016 census measured the population of the rural district as 6,112 in 1,639 households. The most populous of its 59 villages was the Afghan Refugee Camp, with 3,504 people.
