= Middle Persian =

Southwestern Iranian language

- 𐭯𐭠𐭫𐭮𐭩𐭪 (Pārsīk, Pārsīg)
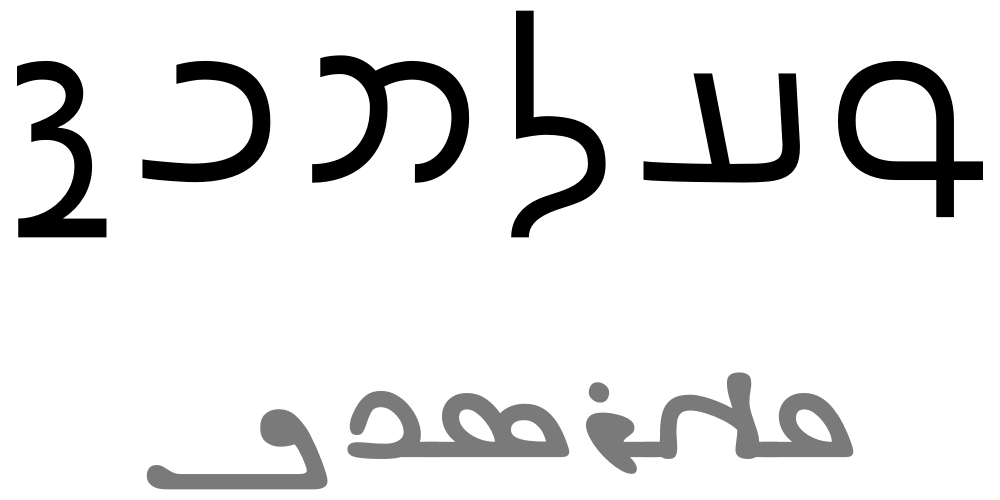
- Region: Sasanian Empire (224–651)
- Ethnicity: Persians
- Era: Evolved into Early New Persian by the 9th century; thereafter used only by Zoroastrian priests for exegesis and religious instruction
- Language family: Indo-European: Indo-Iranian; Iranian; Western; Southwestern; Middle Persian
- Early form: Old Persian
- Writing system: Pahlavi scripts, Manichaean script, Avestan alphabet, Pazend

Language codes
- ISO 639-2: pal
- ISO 639-3: Either: pal – Zoroastrian Middle Persian ("Pahlavi") xmn – Manichaean Middle Persian (Manichaean script)
- Glottolog: pahl1241
- Linguasphere: 58-AAC-ca

Middle Persian, also known by its endonym Pārsīg or, in an earlier form, Pārsīk (Inscriptional Pahlavi script: 𐭯𐭠𐭫𐭮𐭩𐭪, Manichaean script: 𐫛𐫀𐫡𐫘𐫏𐫐, Avestan script: 𐬞𐬀𐬭𐬯𐬍𐬐), is a Western Middle Iranian language which became the literary language of the Sasanian Empire. For some time after the Sasanian collapse, Middle Persian continued to function as a prestige language. It descended from Old Persian, the language of the Achaemenid Empire and is the linguistic ancestor of New Persian, the official language of Iran (also known as Persia), Afghanistan (Dari) and Tajikistan (Tajik).

== Name ==
Ērānīg is a term used to describe Middle Persian during the Sassanid period (224–651 CE). The word, derived from the root Ērān ("Iran, Iranians"), means "belonging to Iran, the Iranian language". This expression, particularly in official inscriptions, indicates that the Sassanids defined themselves as ethnically and culturally "Iranian".

The term appears most clearly in the Ka'ba-i Zartušt inscription of the high priest Kartir. Here, Kartir uses the phrase "ērānīg ud anērānīg" ("the language of the Iranians and the non-Iranians"). Furthermore, the multilingual inscription of Shapur I reveals that Middle Persian was the primary state language of the empire and, together with the concept of Ērānšahr ("Land of Iran"), formed a political identity.

The term Ērānīg: It is one of the most important epigraphic evidences showing the conscious redefinition of Iranian identity during the Sassanid period, reflecting the connection between language, identity and state ideology.

"Middle Iranian" is the name given to the middle stage of development of the numerous Iranian languages and dialects. The middle stage of the Iranian languages begins around 450 BCE and ends around 650 CE. One of those Middle Iranian languages is Middle Persian, i.e. the middle stage of the language of the Persians, an Iranian people of Persia proper, which lies in the south-western Iran highlands on the border with Babylonia. The Persians called their language Parsig, meaning "Persian".

Another Middle Iranian language was Parthian, i.e. the language of the northwestern Iranian peoples of Parthia proper, which lies along the southern/south-eastern edge of the Caspian sea and is adjacent to the boundary between western and eastern Iranian languages. The Parthians called their language Parthawig, meaning "Parthian". Via regular sound changes Parthawig became Pahlawig, from which the word 'Pahlavi' eventually evolved. The -ig in parsig and parthawig was a regular Middle Iranian appurtenant suffix for "pertaining to". The New Persian equivalent of -ig is -i.

When the Arsacids (who were Parthians) came to power in the 3rd century BCE, they inherited the use of written Greek (from the successors of Alexander the Great) as the language of government. Under the cultural influence of the Greeks (Hellenization), some Middle Iranian languages, such as Bactrian, also had begun to be written in Greek script. But yet other Middle Iranian languages began to be written in a script derived from Aramaic. This occurred primarily because written Aramaic had previously been the written language of government of the former Achaemenids, and the government scribes had carried that practice all over the empire. This practice had led to others adopting Imperial Aramaic as the language of communications, both between Iranians and non-Iranians. The transition from Imperial Aramaic to Middle Iranian took place very slowly, with a slow increase of more and more Iranian words so that Aramaic with Iranian elements gradually changed into Iranian with Aramaic elements. Under Arsacid hegemony, this Aramaic-derived writing system for Iranian languages came to be associated with the Parthians in particular (it may have originated in the Parthian chancellories), and thus the writing system came to be called pahlavi "Parthian" too.

Aside from Parthian, Aramaic-derived writing was adopted for at least four other Middle Iranian languages, one of which was Middle Persian. In the 3rd century CE, the Parthian Arsacids were overthrown by the Sassanids, who were natives of the south-west and thus spoke Middle Persian as their native language. Under Sassanid hegemony, the Middle Persian language became a prestige dialect and thus also came to be used by non-Persian Iranians. In the 7th century, the Sassanids were overthrown by the Arabs. Under Arab influence, Iranian languages began to be written in Arabic script (adapted to Iranian phonology), while Middle Persian began to rapidly evolve into New Persian and the name parsik became Arabicized farsi. Not all Iranians were comfortable with these Arabic-influenced developments, in particular, members of the literate elite, which in Sassanid times consisted primarily of Zoroastrian priests. Those former elites vigorously rejected what they perceived as 'Un-Iranian', and continued to use the "old" language (i.e. Middle Persian) and Aramaic-derived writing system. Numerous examples can be identified through the myriad of Middle Persian Zoroastrian scriptures, such as the Denkard, Shkand-gumãnig Vizār, and many more. In time, the name of the writing system, pahlavi "Parthian", began to be applied to the "old" Middle Persian language as well, thus distinguishing it from the "new" language, farsi. Consequently, 'pahlavi' came to denote the particularly Zoroastrian, exclusively written, late form of Middle Persian. Since almost all surviving Middle Persian literature is in this particular late form of exclusively written Zoroastrian Middle Persian, the term 'Pahlavi' became synonymous with Middle Persian itself.

The ISO 639 language code for Middle Persian is pal, which reflects the post-Sasanian era use of the term Pahlavi to refer to the language and not only the script.

== History ==
=== Transition from Old Persian ===
In the classification of the Iranian languages, the Middle Period includes those languages which were common in Iran from the fall of the Achaemenid Empire in the fourth century BCE up to the fall of the Sasanian Empire in the seventh century CE.

The most important and distinct development in the structure of Iranian languages of this period is the transformation from the synthetic form of the Old Period (Old Persian and Avestan) to an analytic form:

- nouns, pronouns, and adjectives lost almost all of their case inflections
- prepositions were used to indicate the different roles of words.
- many tenses began to be formed from a composite form
- the language developed a split ergative morphosyntactic alignment

There were also a number of phonological developments during this period, including:

- Contraction of vowels across semivowels; iya → ī, uwa → ū
- Lenition of voiced stops following vowels and resonants; b, d, z/j, g → β, ð, ʒ, ɣ
- Creation of new /l/ from previous clusters of /r/ and a fricative; i.e. /rð, rz/ → /l/ and /rθ, rs/ → /hl/
- Metathesis -ry- to -yr-, with the /j/ subsequently combining with preceding vowels through processes of monophthongisation
- Monophthongisation of ay(a), aw(a) → ē, ō
- Loss of /θ/ : becoming /s/ word initially and /h/ elsewhere
- Loss of word-final vowels
- Lenition of voiceless stops p, t, č, k to voiced b, d, j (→ z), g

=== Transition to New Persian ===
The modern-day descendants of Middle Persian are New Persian, Achomi and Luri. The changes between late Middle and Early New Persian were very gradual, and in the 10th–11th centuries, Middle Persian texts were still intelligible to speakers of Early New Persian. However, there are definite differences that had taken place already by the 10th century:

- sound changes, such as
  - the dropping of unstressed initial vowels
  - the epenthesis of vowels in initial consonant clusters
  - the loss of -g when word final
  - change of initial w- to either b- or gw- → g-
- changes in the verbal system, notably the loss of distinctive subjunctive and optative forms, and the increasing use of verbal prefixes to express verbal moods
- a transition from split ergative back to consistent nominative-accusative morphosyntactic alignment
- changes in the vocabulary, particularly the establishment of a superstratum or adstratum of Arabic loanwords replacing many Aramaic loans and native terms.
- the substitution of the Pahlavi script for the Arabic script

== Surviving literature ==
Texts in Middle Persian are found in remnants of Sasanian inscriptions and Egyptian papyri, coins and seals, fragments of Manichaean writings, and Zoroastrian literature, most of which was written down after the Sasanian era. The language of Zoroastrian literature (and of the Sasanian inscriptions) is sometimes referred to as Pahlavi – a name that originally referred to the Pahlavi scripts, which were also the preferred writing system for several other Middle Iranian languages. Pahlavi Middle Persian is the language of quite a large body of literature which details the traditions and prescriptions of Zoroastrianism, which was the state religion of Sassanian Iran (224 to c. 650) before the Muslim conquest of Persia. The earliest texts in Zoroastrian Middle Persian were probably written down in late Sassanian times (6th–7th centuries), although they represent the codification of earlier oral tradition. However, most texts date from the ninth to the 11th century, when Middle Persian had long ceased to be a spoken language, so they reflect the state of affairs in living Middle Persian only indirectly. The surviving manuscripts are usually 14th-century copies. Other, less abundantly attested varieties are Manichaean Middle Persian, used for a sizable amount of Manichaean religious writings, including many theological texts, homilies and hymns (3rd–9th, possibly 13th century), and the Middle Persian of the Church of the East, evidenced in the Pahlavi Psalter (7th century); these were used until the beginning of the second millennium in many places in Central Asia, including Turpan and even localities in South India. All three differ minimally from one another and indeed the less ambiguous and archaizing scripts of the latter two have helped to elucidate some aspects of the Sasanian-era pronunciation of the former.

== Phonology ==
=== Vowels ===
The vowels of Middle Persian were the following:

	Front	Central	Back
Close	iː, i		uː, u
Mid	eː, (e)		oː, (o)
Open		aː, a	

It has been doubted whether the Middle Persian short mid vowels /e/ and /o/ were phonemic, since they do not appear to have a unique continuation in later forms of Persian and no minimal pairs have been found. The evidence for them is variation between spelling with and without the matres lectionis y and w, as well as etymological considerations. They are thought to have arisen from earlier /a/ in certain conditions, including, for /e/, the presence of a following /n/, sibilant or front vowel in the next syllable, and for /o/, the presence of a following labial consonant or the vowel /u/ in the next syllable. Long /eː/ and /oː/ had appeared first in Middle Persian, since they had developed from the Old Persian diphthongs /ai/ and /aw/.

=== Consonants ===
The consonant phonemes were the following:

		Labial	Dental	Palatal	Velar	Glottal
Nasal		m	n			
Plosive/ Affricate	voiceless	p	t	t͡ʃ	k	
Plosive/ Affricate	voiced	b	d	d͡ʒ	ɡ	
Fricative	voiceless	f	s (θ) [early]	ʃ	x (xw)	h
Fricative	voiced		z	(ʒ)	(ɣ)	
Trill			r			
Lateral			l			
Semivowel				j	w	

A major distinction between the pronunciation of the early Middle Persian of the Arsacid period (until the 3rd century CE) and the Middle Persian of the Sasanian Empire (3rd – 7th century CE) is due to a process of consonant lenition after voiced sounds that took place during the transition between the two. Its effects were as follows:

1. Voiced stops, when occurring after vowels, became semivowels:

/b/ > /w/, /d/ > /j/, /ɡ/ > /w/ or /j/ (the latter after /i/)

This process may have taken place very early, but it is nevertheless often the old pronunciation or a transitional one that is reflected in the Pahlavi spelling.

Old Persian naiba- > Middle Persian nēw (Pahlavi TB or nyw'), but:
Old Persian asabāra- > Middle Persian asvār 'horseman' (Pahlavi PLŠYA, ʾswblʾ).
Proto-Iranian *pād- > Middle Persian pāy 'foot' (Pahlavi LGLE, pʾd, Manichaean pʾy).
Old Persian magu- > Middle Persian mow- 'Magian' (Pahlavi mgw-).
Proto-Iranian *ni-gauš- > Middle Persian niyōš- 'listen' (Pahlavi nydwhš-, also nydwk(h)š-), Manichaean nywš).

2. Voiceless stops and affricates, when occurring after vowels as well as other voiced sounds, became voiced:

/p/ > /b/, /t/ > /d/, /k/ > /ɡ/, /t͡ʃ/ > /d͡ʒ/

This process is thought not to have taken place before Sasanian Pahlavi, and it generally is not reflected in Pahlavi spelling.

A further stage in this lenition process is expressed in a synchronic alternation: at least at some stage in late Middle Persian (later than the 3rd century), the consonants /b/, /d/, /ɡ/ appear to have had, after vowels, the fricative allophones [β], [ð], [ɣ]. This is slightly more controversial for /ɡ/, since there appears to have been a separate phoneme /ɣ/ as well. A parallel development seems to have affected /d͡ʒ/ in the same position, possibly earlier; not only was it weakened to a fricative [ʒ], but it was also depalatalised to [z]. In fact, old Persian [d͡ʒ] and [ʒ] in any position also produced [z]. Unlike the case with the spirantisation of stops, this change is uncontroversially recognised for Sasanian times.

The lenition of voiceless stops and affricates remained largely unexpressed in Pahlavi spelling, which continues to reflect the Arsacid sound values, but is known from the more phonetic Manichaean spelling of texts from Sasanian times.

Arsacid šap > Sasanian šab (late [ʃaβ]) 'night' (Pahlavi LYLYA, šp'; Manichaean šb)

Arsacid pit > Sasanian pid (late [pið]) 'father' (Pahlavi AB, p(y)t', Manichaean pyd)

Arsacid pārak > Sasanian pārag (late [paːraɣ]) 'gift' (Pahlavi pʾlk')

Arsacid hač > Sasanian az 'from' (Pahlavi MN, hc, Manichaean ʾc or ʾz)

As a result of these changes, the voiceless stops and affricates /p/, /t/, /k/, /t͡ʃ/ rarely occurred after vowels – mostly when geminated, which has protected them from the lenition (e.g. waččag, sp. wck' 'child'), and due to some other sound changes.

Another difference between Arsacid and Sasanian-era pronunciation is that Arsacid word-initial /j/ produced Sasanian /d͡ʒ/ (another change that is not reflected in the Pahlavi spelling). The sound probably passed through the phase /ʒ/, which may have continued until very late Middle Persian, since Manichaean texts did not identify Indic /d͡ʒ/ with it and introduced a separate sign for the former instead of using the letter for their native sound. Nonetheless, word-initial /j/ was retained/reintroduced in learned borrowings from Avestan.

Arsacid yām > Sasanian ǰām 'glass' (Pahlavi yʾm, Manichaean jʾm); but:
Avestan yazata > Middle Persian yazd 'god' (Pahlavi yzdt')

Furthermore, some forms of Middle Persian appear to have preserved ǰ (from Proto-Iranian /d͡ʒ/ or /t͡ʃ/) after n due to Parthian influence, instead of the usual weakening to z. This pronunciation is reflected in Book Pahlavi, but not in Manichaean texts:

Proto-Iranian *panča > panǰ (spelt pnc in Book Pahlavi) or panz (spelt pnz in Manichaean)

Judging from the spelling, the consonant /θ/ may have been pronounced before /r/ in certain borrowings from Parthian in Arsacid times (unlike native words, which had /h/ for earlier *θ in general and /s/ for the cluster *θr in particular), but it had been replaced by /h/ by the Sasanian period:

Arsacid miθr > Sasanian mihr 'Mithra, contract' (Pahlavi mtr', Manichaean myhr).

The phoneme /ɣ/ (as opposed to the late allophone of /ɡ/) is rare and occurs almost only in learned borrowings from Avestan and Parthian, e.g. moγ (Pahlavi mgw or mwg 'Magian'), maγ (Pahlavi mγ) 'hole, pit'.

The sound /ʒ/ may also have functioned as a marginal phoneme in borrowings as well.

The phoneme /l/ was still relatively rare as well, especially so in Manichaean texts, mostly resulting from Proto-Iranian *rd, *rz and, more rarely, *r. It also occurred in the combination /hl/, which was a reflex of Old Persian /rθ/ and /rs/ (cf. the words 'Pahlavi' and 'Parthian').

The sound /xw/ may be viewed as a phoneme or merely as a combination of /x/ and /w/. Usually /x/, /xw/ and /ɣ/ are considered to have been velar; a less common view is that /x/ and /ɣ/ were uvular instead.

Finally, it may be pointed out that most scholars consider the phoneme /w/ as being still a labial approximant, but a few regard it as a voiced labial fricative /v/.

The initial clusters of /s/ and a stop (/sp-/, /st-/, /sk-/) had acquired a prosthetic vowel /i/ by the time of the Manichaean Middle Persian texts: istāyišn (ՙst՚yšn) 'praise' vs Pahlavi stāyišn (ՙst՚dšn') 'praise'.

=== Prosody ===
Stress was on the last syllable. That was due to the fact that any Old Persian post-stress syllables had been apocopated:

Old Persian pati 'at' > Middle Persian pad
Old Persian martiya- 'man' > Middle Persian mard
Old Persian martiyā́nām 'man' (genitive-dative plural) > Middle Persian mardān

It has been suggested that words such as anīy 'other' (Pahlavi spelling AHRN, AHRNyd, Manichaean ՚ny) and mahīy 'bigger' (Manichaean mhy) may have been exceptionally stressed on the first syllable, since the last one was apocopated already in the course of the Middle Persian period: the later forms are an (Manichaean ՚n), and meh (Pahlavi ms and Manichaean myh); indeed, some scholars have reconstructed them as monosyllabic any, mahy even for Middle Persian.

== Scripts ==
Middle Persian has been written in a number of different scripts. The corpora in different scripts also exhibit other linguistic differences that are partly due to their different ages, dialects and scribal traditions.

The Pahlavi scripts are abjads derived from the imperial variety of the Aramaic alphabet used in the chancelleries of the Achaemenid Empire. As is typical of abjads, they express primarily the consonants in a word form. What sets them apart from other abjads, however, is the use of Heterograms, and more specifically Aramaeograms, i.e. words written in Aramaic (sometimes, in later periods, with distortions) but pronounced in Middle Persian: e.g. LY (Aramaic 'to me') for man 'me, I'. There were about a thousand of these in the Book Pahlavi variety. In addition, their spelling remained very conservative, expressing the pronunciation of the Arsacid period. The two most important subvarieties are:

1. Inscriptional Pahlavi, used in the inscriptions of Sassanid kings and officials from the 3rd–4th centuries CE. The 22 letters are written separately and still relatively well distinguished compared to later versions: the only formal coincidences of original Aramaic signs are the pair m and q and the triplet w, ʿ and r.
2. Book Pahlavi, used primarily in Zoroastrian books from the 5th century CE on. Most texts are thought to reflect the stage of the language from the 6th to the 10th centuries CE. (6th–7th centuries for the translations of the Avesta and perhaps some didactic and entertainment literature, 9–10th centuries for the dogmatic and legal texts that form most of the corpus) This is the script that the overwhelming majority of Middle Persian texts is recorded in. It is a cursive script characterised by many ligatures and by the formal coincidence of originally different Aramaic letters, reducing the number to just 14 distinct signs. Now, also n coincides with the triplet w = ʿ = r, and in addition, another triplet g, d and y merges too, as does the pair ʾ and ḥ. Aramaic ṭ had also disappeared. In later times, some mergers were disambiguated by means of diacritic signs, following the example of the Arabic abjad: thus, g, d and y were distinguished again; however, this was not applied consistently.

Other known Pahlavi varieties are the early Pahlavi found in inscriptions on coins issued in the province of Pars from the 2nd century BCE to the 3rd century CE; the relatively conservative Psalter Pahlavi (6th–8th centuries CE), used in a Christian Psalter fragment, which still retains all the letter distinctions that Inscriptional Pahlavi had except the one between t and ṭ; and the Pahlavi found in papyri from the early 7th century CE, which displays even more letter coincidences than Book Pahlavi.

The Manichaean script was an abjad introduced for the writing of Middle Persian by the prophet Mani (216–274 CE), who based it on his native variety of the Aramaic script of Palmyrene origin. Mani used this script to write the known book Šābuhrāgān and it continued to be used by Manichaeans until the 9th century to write in Middle Persian, and in various other Iranian languages for even longer. Specifically the Middle Persian Manichaean texts are numerous and thought to reflect mostly the period from the 3rd to the 7th centuries CE. In contrast to the Pahlavi scripts, it is a regular and unambiguous phonetic script that expresses clearly the pronunciation of 3rd century Middle Persian and distinguishes clearly between different letters and sounds, so it provides valuable evidence to modern linguists. Not only did it not display any of the Pahlavi coalescences mentioned above, it also had special letters that enabled it to distinguish [p] and [f] (although it did not always do so), as well as [j] and [d͡ʒ], unique designations for [β], [ð], and [ɣ], and consistent distinctions between the pairs [x] – [h] and [r] – [l].

Since knowledge of Pahlavi decreased after the Muslim conquest of Iran, the Zoroastrians occasionally transcribed their religious texts into other, more accessible or unambiguous scripts. One approach was to use the Avestan alphabet, a practice known as Pazand; another was to resort to the same Perso-Arabic script that was already being used for New Persian, and that was referred to as Pārsī. Since these methods were used at a relatively late linguistic stage, these transcriptions often reflect a very late pronunciation close to New Persian.

In general, Inscriptional Pahlavi texts have the most archaic linguistic features, Manichaean texts and the Psalter exhibit slightly later, but still relatively early language stages, and while the Pahlavi translations of the Avesta also retain some old features, most other Zoroastrian Book Pahlavi texts (which form the overwhelming majority of the Middle Persian corpus as a whole) are linguistically more innovative.

== Transliteration and transcription ==
=== Transliteration of Pahlavi script ===
In view of the many ambiguities of the Pahlavi script, even its transliteration does not usually limit itself to rendering merely the letters as written; rather, letters are usually transliterated in accordance with their origin regardless of the coinciding forms: thus, even though Book Pahlavi has the same letter shapes for original n, w and r, for original ʾ and ḥ and for original d, g and y, besides having some ligatures that coincide in shape with certain individual letters, these are all transliterated differently. For instance, the spelling of gōspand 'domestic animal' is transliterated gwspnd in spite of the fact that the w and n have the same graphic appearance.

Furthermore, letters used as part of Aramaic heterograms and not intended to be interpreted phonetically are written in capitals: thus the heterogram for the word ān is rendered ZK, whereas its phonetic spelling is transliterated as ʾn' (the final vertical line reflects the so-called 'otiose' stroke, see below). Finally, there is a convention of representing 'distorted/corrupt' letters, which 'should' have appeared in a different shape from a historical point of view, by under- or overlining them: e.g. the heterogram for andar 'in' is transliterated BYN, since it corresponds to Aramaic byn, but the sign that 'should' have been b actually looks like a g.

Within Arameograms, scholars have traditionally used the standard Semitological designations of the Aramaic (and generally Semitic) letters, and these include a large number of diacritics and special signs expressing the different Semitic phonemes, which were not distinguished in Middle Persian. In order to reduce the need for these, a different system was introduced by D. N. MacKenzie, which dispenses with diacritics as much as possible, often replacing them with vowel letters: A for ʾ, O for ʿ, E for H, H for Ḥ, C for Ṣ, for example ORHYA for ʿRḤYʾ (bay 'god, majesty, lord'). For ''ṭ'', which still occurs in heterograms in Inscriptional Pahlavi, Θ may be used. Within Iranian words, however, both systems use c for original Aramaic ṣ and h for original Aramaic ḥ, in accordance with their Iranian pronunciation (see below). The letter l, when modified with a special horizontal stroke that shows that the pronunciation is /l/ and not /r/, is rendered in the MacKenzie system as ɫ. The traditional system continues to be used by many, especially European scholars. The MacKenzie system is the one used in this article.

=== Transliteration of Manichaean script ===
As for Pahlavi, c is used for the transliteration of original Aramaic ṣ and h for the transliteration of original ḥ. Original Aramaic h, on the other hand, is sometimes rendered as ẖ. For original ṭ, the sign ṯ is used. The special Manichaean letters for /x/, /f/, [β], /ɣ/ and [ð] are transcribed in accordance with their pronunciation as x, f, β, γ and δ. Unlike Pahlavi, the Manichaean script uses the letter Ayin also in Iranian words (see below) and it is transliterated in the usual Semitological way as ՙ.

=== Transcription ===
Since, like most abjads, even the Manichaean script and a maximally disambiguated transliterated form of Pahlavi do not provide exhaustive information about the phonemic structure of Middle Persian words, a system of transcription is also necessary. There are two traditions of transcription of Pahlavi Middle Persian texts: one closer to the spelling and reflecting the Arsacid-era pronunciation, as used by Ch. Bartholomae and H. S. Nyberg (1964) and a currently more popular one reflecting the Sassanid-era pronunciation, as used by C. Saleman, W. B. Henning and, in a somewhat revised form, by D. N. MacKenzie (1986).

The less obvious features of the usual transcription are:

1. long vowels are marked with a macron: ā, ē, ī, ō, ū for /aː/, /eː/, /iː/, /oː/, /uː/.
2. The semivowels are marked as follows: w for /w/ and y for /j/.
3. The palatal obstruents are marked with carons as follows: š for /ʃ/, č for /t͡ʃ/, ǰ for /d͡ʒ/ and ž for /ʒ/.
4. The voiceless velar fricative /x/ is marked as x, its labialised counterpart /xw/ is xw, and the (phonemic) voiced velar fricative /ɣ/ is γ.

== Spelling ==
A common feature of Pahlavi as well as Manichaean spelling was that the Aramaic letters ṣ and ḥ were adapted to express the sounds /t͡ʃ/ and /h/, respectively. In addition, both could use the letter p to express /f/, and ṣ to express z after a vowel.

=== Pahlavi ===
==== Arameograms ====
The widespread use of Aramaeograms in Pahlavi, often existing in parallel with 'phonetic' spellings, has already been mentioned: thus, the same word hašt 'eight' can be spelt hšt or TWMNYA. A curious feature of the system is that simple word stems sometimes have spellings derived from Aramaic inflected forms: the spellings of verb stems include Aramaic inflectional affixes such as -WN, -TWN or -N and Y-; the spellings of pronouns are often derived from Aramaic prepositional phrases (tо̄ 'you' is LK, originally Aramaic lk 'to you', о̄y 'he' is OLE, originally Aramaic ʿlh 'onto him'); and inalienable nouns are often noun phrases with pronominal modifiers (pidar 'father' is ABYtl, originally Aramaic ʾby 'my father', pāy 'foot' is LGLE, originally Aramaic rglh 'his foot'). Furthermore, the Aramaic distinctions between ḥ and h and between k and q were not always maintained, with the first often replacing the second, and the one between t and ṭ was lost in all but Inscriptional Pahlavi: thus YKTLWN (pronounced о̄zadan) for Aramaic yqṭlwn 'kill', and YHWWN (pronounced būdan) for Aramaic yhwwn 'be', even though Aramaic h is elsewhere rendered E. In the rest of this article, the Pahlavi spellings will be indicated due to their unpredictability, and the Aramaeograms will be given priority over the 'phonetic' alternatives for the same reason.

If a word expressed by an Arameogram has a grammatical ending or, in many cases, a word-formation suffix, these are generally expressed by phonetic elements: LYLYAʾn for šabʾn 'nights'. However, verbs in Inscriptional Pahlavi are sometimes written as 'bare ideograms', whose interpretation is a major difficulty for scholars.

==== Historical and ambiguous spelling ====
It has also been pointed out that the Pahlavi spelling does not express the 3rd century lenitions, so the letters p, t, k and c express /b/, /d/, /ɡ/ and /z/ after vowels, e.g. šp' for šab 'night' and hc for az 'from'. The rare phoneme /ɣ/ was also expressed by the same letter shape as k (however, this sound value is usually expressed in the transliteration). Similarly, the letter d may stand for /j/ after a vowel, e.g. pʾd for pāy 'foot' – this is no longer apparent in Book Pahlavi due to the coincidence of the shapes of the original letters y, d and g, but is already clearly seen in Inscriptional and Psalter Pahlavi. Indeed, it even appears to have been the general rule word-finally, regardless of the word's origins, although modern transliterations of words like xwadāy (xwtʾd) and mēnōy (mynwd) do not always reflect this analogical / pseudo-historical spelling. Final īy was regularly written yd. In the same way, (w)b may also correspond to a w in the pronunciation after a vowel. The fortition of initial /j/ to /d͡ʒ/ (or /ʒ/) is not reflected either, so y can express initial /d͡ʒ/, e.g. yʾm for ǰām 'glass' (while it still expresses /j/ in the learned word yzdt' for yazd 'god').

Some even earlier sound changes are not consistently reflected either, such as the transition of /θ/ to /h/ in some words (in front of /r/ this reflex is due to Parthian influence, since the Middle Persian reflex should have been /s/). In such words, the spelling may have s or, in front of r – t. For example, gāh 'place, time' is spelt gʾs (cf. Old Persian gāθu) and nigāh '(a) look' is spelt nkʾs; šahr 'country, town' is spelt štr' (cf. Avestan xsaθra) and mihr 'Mithra, contract, friendship' is spelt mtr'. In contrast, the Manichaean spellings are gʾh, ngʾh, šhr, myhr. Some other words with earlier /θ/ are spelt phonetically in Pahlavi, too: e.g. gēhān, spelt gyhʾn 'material world', and čihr, spelt cyhl 'face'. There are also some instances where /h/ and /j/ are spelt /t/ when occurring after p. For instance, when the suffix of a word originates from Old Persian pati such as in: ptkʾl for pahikār 'strife', ptwnd for paywand 'connection'.

There are some other phoneme pairs besides /j/ and /d͡ʒ/ that are not distinguished: h (the original Aramaic ḥ) may stand either for /h/ or for /x/ (hm for ham 'also' as well as hl for xar 'donkey'), whereas the use of original Aramaic h is restricted to heterograms (transliterated E in MacKenzie's system, e.g. LGLE for pāy 'foot'). Not only /p/, but also the frequent sound /f/ is expressed by the letter p, e.g. plhw' for farrox 'fortunate'. While the original letter r is retained in some words as an expression of the sound /r/, especially in older frequent words and Aramaeograms (e.g. štr' for šahr 'country, town', BRTE for duxt 'daughter'), it is far more common for the letter l to have that function, as in the example plhw' for farrox. In the relatively rare cases where l does express /l/, it can be marked as ɫ.

==== Expression of vowels ====
Like many abjads, the system may express not only consonants, but also some vowels by means of certain consonant signs, the so-called matres lectionis. This is usually limited to long vowels: thus, original ʾ can stand for the vowel /aː/ (e.g. in pʾd for pād), y can stand for /iː/ and /eː/ (e.g.pym for pīm 'pain' and nym for nēm 'half'), and w can stand for /uː/ or /oː/ (swt' for sūd 'profit' and swl for sōr 'salty'). However, short /u/ is also typically expressed like long /uː/ (e.g. swd for suy 'hunger'), whereas short /i/ and the assumed /e/ and /o/ vary between being expressed like their long counterparts or remaining unexpressed: p(y)t for pid 'father', sl(y)šk for srešk 'tear', nhwm for nohom 'ninth'. Due to elision of /w/, written yw can also correspond to /eː/: nywk' 'good'. Gemination of consonants was not expressed, e.g. waččag, sp. wck' 'child').

In Inscriptional and Psalter Pahlavi, a -y that was not pronounced appears word-finally, e.g. šhpwhry for Šahpuhr. Its origin and function are disputed. In Book Pahlavi, it developed into a peculiar convention, the so-called 'otiose' stroke, which resembles w/n/r and is added to demarcate the end of the word after those letters that never connect to the left: mān' 'house'.

Like many abjads, Pahlavi ʾ can express simply the fact that a word begins in a vowel, e.g. ʾp̄ʾyt' for abāyēd 'it is necessary' (though two alephs usually are not written in a row to express an initial long vowel).

=== Manichaean ===
In contrast to the historical and ideographic features of Pahlavi, Manichaean spelling is relatively straightforward. Like Pahlavi, the Manichaean script designates vowel-initial words with ʾ, but a further spelling convention in it is that it is the letter ՙ, rather than ʾ, that is written before initial front vowels, e.g. ՙym for im 'this' (in contrast to Pahlavi ʾm (or LZNE). Vowels are marked by matres lectionis in the Manichaean script in the usual way, and long vowels are more likely to be marked.

In spite of the availability of signs for each sound, Manichaean spelling did not always make perfectly phonetic use of them. In particular, not only in Pahlavi but even in Manichaean, the letter p was often used to express /f/, and /z/ after vowels was written etymologically as c: thus, frāz 'forth' was spelt prʾc, just as in Pahlavi. If the voiced fricatives really occurred as allopohones of /b/, /ɡ/, /d/ in Middle Persian, the special Manichaean signs for fricatives β, γ and δ usually were not used to express this either. Conversely, the Semitic letters for the consonants q, ṭ and h (transliterated ẖ in Manichaean) were retained and used, occasionally, even though they only expressed the same Middle Persian sounds as k and t, and ḥ (transliterated h in Manichaean). The Manichaean script also has abbreviation marking double dots for the forms ʾwd 'and', ʾw-š 'and he' and ʾw-šʾn 'and they', which may be transcribed as ẅ, š̈ and š̈ʾn. Elisions and plural may also be marked with double dots.

== Grammar ==
The elision of unstressed word-final syllables during the transition from Old to Middle Persian has eliminated many grammatical endings. As a result, compared to the synthetic grammar of Old Persian, Middle Persian belongs to a much more analytic language type, with relatively little inflection and widespread expression of grammatical meanings through syntactic means instead (specifically, use of prepositions and periphrases).

=== Nominal morphology ===
==== Case and number inflection ====
Early Middle Persian inflection as found in the Sassanid rock inscriptions (3rd–4th centuries CE) still retained a minimal case system for the nominal parts of speech, i.e. nouns, adjectives, pronouns and numerals. It included a direct or subject case (originating from the old nominative) used for the subject and the predicative nominal and an oblique case used for other functions (indirect object, genitive possessor, complement of a preposition, subject/'agent' of the ergative construction). The case distinction was only present in the plural of nouns, in nouns of relationship (family terms) that end in -tar or -dar in the oblique, and in the first person singular pronoun az/an (ANE). The attested system is shown in the table below, using the words mard (GBRA) 'man' and pid (AB') 'father' as examples.

	direct case	oblique case
regular nominals (singular)	mard-∅ (GBRA)	mard-∅ (GBRA)
regular nominals (plural)	mard-∅ (GBRA)	mard-ān (GBRAʾn') (in some exceptional words -īn, -ūn)
family terms (singular)	pid-∅ (AB')	pidar-∅ (ABYtl')
family terms (plural)	pidar-∅ (ABYtl')	pidar-ān (ABYtlʾn')
1st person singular pronoun	az / an (ANE)	man (L)

The endings -īn and -ūn occur in the place of -ān in a decreasing number of exceptions. In Inscriptional Pahlavi, forms such as frazendīn (przndyn') 'of the children' and dušmenūn (dwšm(y)nwn') 'of the enemies' are still found. In Manichaean Middle Persian, likewise, forms such as zanīn (spelt znyn), 'women', ruwānīn 'souls' and dušmenūn (dwšmynwn) are preserved. It also has the form awīn as an equivalent of awēšān 'they, those'. In Book Pahlavi, the generalisation of -ān has advanced to the point where only -īn is preserved, namely in the inflections of the words harw (KRA) and harwisp (hlwsp̄') 'every, all' – plural harwīn and harwisp-īn or harwistīn, respectively, as well as optionally of dō (2, TLYN'), 'two' – plural dōwīn or dōnīn.

There is some disagreement and uncertainty about whether the case of the direct object in this early inflectional system was direct or oblique. Originally, it should have been direct in the ergative-absolutive constructions, but possibly oblique in the nominative-accusative ones. It has been claimed that 'the direct object could stand in both cases' or that it is unclear which case specifically the plural direct object took, with a suggested distinction between indefinite and definite direct object taking the direct and the oblique cases, respectively.

For an even more archaic stage, some have claimed that the singular of regular nominals had its own oblique case form, too, and that it was marked by the ending -ē (spelt -y), which still occurs on nouns in Inscriptional and Psalter Pahlavi, albeit somewhat unsystematically. This would have been expected, assuming that both oblique forms continue the Old Iranian genitives in *-ahya and *-ānam, respectively. However, this theory has been disputed and rejected by many scholars.

The case system broke down in the course of the Middle Persian period, as the oblique case forms were gradually generalised and displaced the direct ones. First, the oblique plural form in -ān (-īn and -ūn) was generalised as a general plural form; a few instances of this usage are found as early as in the 6th–8th century Pahlavi Psalter, and while the preserved parts of the 3rd century Shābuhragān may retain it, most other Manichaean texts use -ān as a general plural form and only retain the case distinction in the family terms and the 1st singular pronoun. Finally, even though the Middle Persian translations of the Avesta still retain the old system, most clearly so in the family terms, the other Book Pahlavi Zoroastrian texts display the new system with no case distinctions at all and solely a contrast between singular and plural. At this stage, the old direct and oblique cases of the nouns of relationship such as pid and pidar were preserved only as free variants. At the same time, even when morphologically unexpressed, the 'underlying' case of a nominal phrase remains relevant throughout the Middle Persian period for the agreement on the verb and the use of the pronominal enclitics, to be described in the relevant sections.

In addition to the plural ending -ān, a new plural suffix -īhā is increasingly common both in later Manichaean texts, where also the variant -īhān occurs, and especially in Book Pahlavi. It is used with inanimate nouns and has been said to express 'individual plurality': 'the various, individual Xs'. At the same time, -ān is still used with inanimate as well as with animate nouns, and is far more common than -īhā. Some examples are šahr-īhā (štryhʾ) 'countries' and dar-īhā (BBAyhʾ) 'doors', but also čiš-ān (MNDOMʾn) 'things'. The resulting late Middle Persian system looks as follows, as exemplified with the words mard 'man' and kо̄f 'mountain':

singular	default plural	individual plural
mard-∅ (GBRA) kо̄f-∅ (kwp)	mard-ān (GBRAʾn') kо̄f-ān (kwpʾn) (in some exceptional words -īn)	kо̄f-īhā (kwpyhʾ) (Manichaean -īhān)

As long as case declension was still preserved, a possessor noun stood in the oblique case. In this older construction, it preceded the possessed noun. After the breakdown of the case system, what remained of this construction was a simple juxtaposition between a possessor noun and a possessed noun, and that was indeed preserved as one possible expression of possession: e.g. dūdag sālār (dwtk' srdʾl) 'the head of a family', 'the family('s) head', Ōhrmazd nām (ʾwhrmzd ŠM) 'the name of Ahuramazda'. However, there was also a more explicit option using the relative particle ī, which introduced a following possessor nominal phrase (also in the oblique case, as long as the distinction existed): e.g. sālār ī dūdag (srdʾl Y dwtk'), nām ī Ōhrmazd (ŠM y ʾwhrmzd). This is discussed in more detail in the section on the relative particle.

==== Definiteness ====
Indefiniteness may be expressed by the encliticisation of the word ē(w) (spelt '1' or HD) 'one' to a noun: mard-ēw (GBRA-1) 'a (certain) man'. This usage has been described by certain scholars as an 'indefinite article', while others do not regard it as such, since its use is far less common than that of the English word a(n).

==== Adjectives ====
===== Agreement =====
Originally, adjectives had the same inflectional categories as nouns and took the same endings. When used independently as nouns, they still have number inflection: weh-ān (ŠPYLʾn) 'the good (people)'. When they are used as attributive modifers of nouns, however, agreement is optional and, while it remains common in Manichaean Middle Persian, it is increasingly rare in Book Pahlavi, where, e.g. both abārīgān gyāgān (ʾp̄ʾrykʾn gywʾkʾn ) 'other places' and abārīg dēwān (ʾp̄ʾryk' ŠDYAʾn) 'other demons' have been attested. When the modifying adjective is introduced by the relative particle ī, as well as in predicative position, it never takes the plural suffix: e.g. mardān ī weh (GBRAʾn Y ŠPYL) 'good men'. Some sources also assert that the original singular oblique case ending -ē (-y) is seen in attributive preposed adjectives in some examples: e.g. čē-š asar karb az asarē rо̄šnīh frāz brēhēnīd (MEš ʾsl klp MN ʾsly lwšnyh prʾc blyhynyt) 'for he created the eternal form from eternal light'.

===== Comparison =====
Comparison of adjectives (as well as adverbs) is regularly expressed with the comparative degree suffix -tar (spelt -tl) and the superlative degree suffix -tom (spelt -twm), or possibly -tum; in Manichaean, they also have the allomorphs -dar and -dom after voiced consonants. For example, abēzag (ʾp̄yck') 'pure' is compared abēzag-tar 'purer' – abēzag-tom 'purest'.

There are also some irregular or relict forms reflecting more ancient suffixes (comparative -y or -īy or resulting fronting of the preceding vowel, superlative -ist) and/or suppletion:

positive	comparative	superlative	meaning
xо̄b/xūb (xwp)	weh (ŠPYL), Manichaean also wahy or wahīy (sp. why)	pahlom (pʾhlwm), pāšom/pašom (p(ʾ)šwm); cf. wahišt (whšt') 'paradise'	'good'
wazurg/wuzurg (LBA, wc(w)lg)	meh (ms), mahistar (mhstl); Manichaean also mahy or mahīy (sp. mhy)	mahist (msst')	'big'
kо̄dag/kо̄dak (kwtk')	keh (ks)	kahist (ksst')	'small'
was (KBD)	wēš (wyš), frāy (plʾy), freh (plyh)	frāyist (plʾyst'), frahist (plh(y)st')	'much', 'a lot', 'many'
kam (km)	kem (kym)	kamist (kmyst')	'a little', 'few'
garān (glʾn')	grāy (glʾy)	grāyist (glʾyst')	'heavy, serious'
nazd (nzd)	-------	nazdist (nzdst')	'near', in superlative also 'first'
dо̄šag (dwšk')	-------	Manichaean: dо̄šist (dwšyst)	'beloved'

In some cases, only a 'superlative' form exists without corresponding positive and comparative forms: bālist (bʾlyst') 'supreme, highermost', nidom (nytwm) 'lowermost', bēdom (bytwm) outermost, fradom (AWLA) 'first', abdom (ʾp̄dwm) 'last'.

The object of comparison for an adjective in the comparative degree is introduced by the preposition az (hc) 'from', the subordinating conjunction kū (AYK) 'where, that' or, more rarely, čiyо̄n (cygwn') 'as': о̄y az/kū/čiyо̄n tо̄ о̄zо̄mandtar (OLE MN/AYK/cygwn' LK ʾwcʾmndtl) 'he is stronger than you.' The object of comparison for an adjective in the superlative degree is introduced by the preposition az (hc) or simply by a possessive construction: о̄y (az) mardʾn о̄zо̄mandtom (sp. OLE (MN) GBRAʾn ʾwcʾmndtwm) 'he is the strongest of the men'.

===== Placement =====
When adjectives modify a noun without the help of any linking particle, they usually precede them, but may occasionally follow them, too. A far more common possibility than either is for the adjective to be introduced by the relative particle ī, on which see the relevant section. Thus, e.g. 'a/the big house' can be expressed as wazurg mān (LBA mʾn'), mān wazurg (mʾn' LBA) or mān ī wazurg (mʾn' Y LBA).

==== Pronouns ====
===== Personal pronouns =====
The personal pronouns have a stressed form and an enclitic form. They are as follows:

	singular			plural		
	stressed		enclitic	stressed		enclitic
1st person	direct case	oblique case	-(i)m (sp. -m)	amā(h) (sp. LNE)		-(i)mān (sp. -mʾn') Inscriptional Pahlavi: -(i)n (sp. -n')
1st person	az / an (sp. ANE)	man (sp. L, LY)	-(i)m (sp. -m)	amā(h) (sp. LNE)		-(i)mān (sp. -mʾn') Inscriptional Pahlavi: -(i)n (sp. -n')
2nd person	tо̄ (sp. LK)		-(i)t (sp. -t)	ašmā(h) (sp. LKWM)		-(i)tān (sp. -tʾn')
3rd person	о̄y (sp. OLE)		-(i)š (sp. -š)	direct case	oblique case	-(i)šān (sp. -šʾn')
3rd person	о̄y (sp. OLE)		-(i)š (sp. -š)	о̄y (sp. OLE)	awēšān (sp. OLEšʾn')	-(i)šān (sp. -šʾn')
3rd person	о̄y (sp. OLE)		-(i)š (sp. -š)	Manichaean: awīn (sp.ʾwyn)		-(i)šān (sp. -šʾn')

The enclitic allomorphs with initial /i/ (-im, etc.) are used after consonants. The vowel /u/ or /o/ can also appear instead of /i/, albeit rarely (-um, -om). The spelling variant LY of man is used before the particle -iz (c) 'too': man-iz is spelt LYc.

====== Case forms and syntactic function ======
Of the personal pronouns proper, only the first stressed form has an attested case distinction, but the use of the direct case is already archaic in Book Pahlavi, where the form man (L) is generalised. The pronunciation of the direct case form is controversial – Manichaean has only an (ʾn), whereas the form az has been said to be due to influence from Parthian and its existence has been questioned. In addition, the third person pronoun is originally a demonstrative pronoun and is declined like a noun, so originally the form with the plural suffix -ān – and, presumably, the Manichaean one in -īn – appeared only in the oblique case; however, again, the oblique was generalised in Manichaean and Book Pahlavi. Apart from that, the stressed forms can have all the same syntactic functions as a noun: subject (man wēnēm, sp. L HZYTWNym, 'I see'), object (man wēnēd, sp. L HZYTWNyt', 'he sees me'), complement of a preposition (о̄ man, sp. OL L, 'to me'), and a modifier expressing a possessor. As with nouns, the last option is possible in two ways. The first one, which is significantly rarer, is for the pronoun to be placed before another noun. Much more frequently, it is postposed and linked to the head noun with the relative particle ī. Thus, 'my house' can be expressed as man mān (L mʾn'), but more commonly as mān ī man (mʾn' Y L).

In contrast, the enclitic forms can only have oblique functions: i.e., they cannot correspond to the (non-ergative) subject of the sentence, although a few such cases have been attested in late texts, possibly due to New Persian influence. They can, however, express:

1. an indirect object, e.g. u-š guft Ohrmazd ... (APš gwpt'/YMRRWNt' ʾwhrmzd), 'and Ohrmazd told him... ';
2. a possessor, e.g. ka-t čašm о̄ zrēh о̄ftēd (AMTt AYNE OL zlyh ʾwptyt') 'when your eye (i.e. glance) falls on the sea'; u-m mād Spandarmad (APm AM spndrmt') 'and my mother is Spenta Armaiti'
3. the complement of a preposition, e.g. čē-š andar (MEš BYN) 'which is in it '
4. the agent in an ergative construction, e.g. xwamn ī-m dīd (hwmn' ZYm HZYTWN) 'the dream which I saw',
5. a direct object in a non-ergative construction, e.g. u-š о̄zan! (APš YKTLWN) 'and kill it!'

====== Placement of the enclitic pronouns ======
The enclitic form is usually attached to a word in the beginning of the clause, typically to the first one, and that is often a conjunction or a particle: specifically it occurs frequently after the conjunctions ud 'and' (which appears before these enclitics as the allomorph u- and is spelt AP), ka (AMT) 'when', kū (AYK) 'that, so that', čē (ME) 'because', after the relative particle ī (then spelt ZY-), the relative pronoun kē (MNW) 'who, which' and the particle ā- (ʾ) 'then'. Two enclitics can occur after each other, in which case the 1st person enclitic comes first, and in the absence of such, the enclitic denoting the agent has priority: e.g. ān owо̄n-im-iš wahišt nimūd (ZK ʾwgwnmš whšt' nmwt') 'in that manner he showed me paradise.'

When the pronoun is logically the complement of a preposition, it is usually nevertheless not attached to it. Still, such examples do occur occasionally and tend then to be written phonetically instead of the usual spelling of the preposition with an Aramaeogram, e.g. az-iš 'from her', spelt hcš rather than MNš as usually, and о̄-mān 'to us', spelt ʾwmʾn' instead of OLmʾn. More commonly, however, the enclitic is attached to the first word of the clause, so that the preposition that governs it ends up being placed after it, as in the already adduced example čē-š andar 'which is in it'. The exception are the prepositions pad (PWN) 'at', о̄ (OL) 'to' and az (MN) 'from', which do accept the 3rd person enclitic -(i)š, using it both with a singular and with a plural reference, and о̄ then appears as the allomorph aw before -iš: padiš (ptš), awiš (ʾwbš), aziš (hcš). However, if the logical complement is of a non-3rd person, the appropriate enclitic (-(i)m, etc.) is attached to the first word in the clause rather than the preposition, and it is 'resumed' on the preposition itself by the 3rd person enclitic: e.g. u-m awiš (APm ʾwbm 'on me'). A relative pronoun can be 'resumed' like this, too: kē ... padiš 'on ... which', and even a noun can, sometimes: Zardušt ... padiš 'for... Zarathustra'.

===== Reflexive pronouns =====
There are two reflexive pronouns – a nominal one xwad (BNPŠE) 'oneself' and an adjectival one xwēš (NPŠE) 'one's own' (earlier xwēbaš, hence Manichaean xw(b)š.

===== Demonstrative pronouns =====
The demonstrative pronouns can be used with singular and plural referents, with the exception of о̄y. They are the following:

1. ēn (ZNE) 'this', used deictically as well as preparatively, with a meaning 'the following';
2. (h)ān (ZK, Manichaean hʾn) 'that', with a plural ānēšān found only in Manichaean, used anaphorically and in a determinative function to indicate a noun followed by a relative clause;
3. о̄y (OLE) 'that' with a plural awēšān (OLEšʾn'), also used as a 3rd person pronoun;

Some rarer ones are:

1. ēd (HNA) 'this', used deictically, but rare;
2. im (LZNE) 'this' with a plural imēšān and imīn used in Manichaean, occurring in Book Pahlavi mostly in set phrases such as im cim rāy (LZNE cym lʾd) 'for this reason', im rо̄z (LZNE YWM) 'today').

Some other demonstrative pronouns are ham (hm) 'the same' and and (ʾnd) 'so much'. Demonstrative adverbs are ēdо̄n (ʾytwn'), о̄wо̄n (ʾwgwn') and о̄h (KN), all three of which mean 'so, thus'; ēdar 'here' (LTME); awar 'hither' (LPNME), which is also used as an imperative 'come here!' and has a plural form awarēd (LPNMEyt'), ōrōn (ʾwlwn') 'hither'; ānо̄h (TME) 'there'; nūn (KON) 'now'; ēg (ADYN) 'then, thereupon'; ā- (ʾ) 'then' (normally used with a following enclitic pronoun); hād (HWEt') 'now, then'; pas (AHL) 'afterwards'; pēš LOYN' 'before that, earlier'.

===== Interrogative pronouns =====
The interrogative pronouns can normally also be used as relative pronouns and introduce dependent clauses, and as well as indefinite pronouns. The main ones are kē (MNW) 'who', čē (ME) 'what', 'what kind of', 'which', kadām (ktʾm) 'what kind of, which', kadār (ktʾl) 'which' and čand (cnd) 'how much/many'. The first two and the last one are also used as relative pronouns, i.e. they introduce dependent clauses and mean 'which'. In that use, they can not be preceded by prepositions, so they are instead resumed in the dependent clause by the 3rd person singular enclitic or a demonstrative pronoun: 'from which' can be expressed by kē ... aziš and 'with which' can be kē' ... abāg. Interrogative adverbs are čiyо̄n? (cygwn) 'how', kū? (AYK) 'where' and kay? (AYMT) 'when'. The first two can also introduce dependent clauses as relative pronominal adverbs, meaning 'as' and 'that', respectively. The relative adverb corresponding to kay? (AYMT) is, however, ka (AYT) 'when'.

===== Indefinite pronouns =====
The specialised indefinite pronouns are:

1. ēč or hēč (ʾyc) 'any' (attributive).
2. kas (AYŠ) 'anybody'. It is also used as a noun: 'a person'.
3. tis (a southwestern form) or čis (a northwestern form) (sp. MNDOM) 'something'. It is also used as a noun: 'a thing'.

As already mentioned, the interrogative word čand (cnd) can also be used as an indefinite one: 'any number/amount', whereas ē(w)-čand (ʾy(w)cnd) is unambiguously indefinite: 'some (number/amount), a few'. An indefinite adverb is hagriz (hklc) 'ever'. The indefinite meaning can be reinforced by the particle -iz, sp. -(y)c, meaning 'too'. Thus kas-iz 'whoever', etc. The form of čē in this case is extended to čēgām-iz 'whatever'.

Together with a negative particle nē 'not' occurring in the same clause, the indefinite pronouns also function as negative ones: 'not ... anybody' > 'nobody' etc.: e.g. kas nē bawēd (AYŠ LA YHWWNyt') 'there will be nobody.'

===== Alternative pronouns =====
Pronouns are anīy (AHRN) 'other' and abārīg (ʾp̄ʾlyk') 'other, further'; a corresponding pronominal adverb is enyā (ʾynyʾ) 'otherwise'.

===== Universal pronouns =====
There are many pronouns with universal meaning, including har(w) (KRA, hl, Manichaean hrw) 'every' (pl. harwīn); ham (hm) 'altogether, all, whole', hamāg (hmʾk') 'whole, entire, all', hāmōyēn (hʾmwdyn') 'all, the whole', wisp (wsp) 'all, each, every', harwisp hlwsp̄ (pl. harwispīn) or harwist 'all, each, every'. A pronominal adverb with universal meaning is hamē(w) (Book Pahlavi hmʾy, Manichaean hmyw) 'always'.

==== The relative particle ====
Within a nominal phrase, many different kinds of modifiers following the head were introduced by so-called relative particle ī (spelt ZY- in Inscriptional and Psalter Pahlavi, but Y in Book Pahlavi except in front of pronominal enclitics; in Manichaean also īg, sp. ʿyg), which could be roughly translated as 'which'. This is the predecessor of the New Persian construction known as Ezāfe. It could introduce:

1. adjectives: kunišn ī nēk (kwnšn' Y nywk') 'good deed'
2. 'genitive' possessor noun or pronoun phrases: pus ī Ardawān (BRE Y ʾldwʾn) 'son of Ardawan'
3. prepositional phrases: awīn ī andar diz 'those in the fortress'
4. dependent clauses: ēn warzīgar ... ī pad ēn deh mānēd (ZNE wlcykl ... Y PWN ZNE MTA KTLWNyt') 'that farmer that lives in this village'

Besides following the head, the modifier can be attached to a demonstrative pronoun, usually (h)ān (ZK) 'that', but also ēn (ZNE), ōy (OLE) and ēd (HNA), which precedes the head of the phrase:

ān ī ahlaw kas (ZK Y ʾhlwb' AYŠ) 'the righteous person'

ān ī-š pādixšāyīhā zan (ZK Yš ŠLYTAyhʾ NYŠE) 'the wife he is lawfully married to', lit. 'the wife he lawfully has'.

=== Adverbs ===
Many adjectives can be used adverbially without any change: Ardawān saxt awištāft 'Ardawan was in a great hurry' (ʾldwn sht' ʾwštʾp̄t), lit. 'Ardawan was hurrying greatly'. However, adverbs can also be formed from adjectives, as well as from nouns and phrases, by adding the suffix -īhā (-yhʾ): tuxšāg-īhā (twxšʾkyhʾ) 'diligent-ly', dād-īhā (dʾtyhʾ) 'law-fully'.

Like adjectives, adverbs can be compared; e.g. azabar (hcpl) 'above' – azabartar (hcpltl) 'farther above' – azabartom (hcpltwm) 'farthest above'. Adverbs in -īhā can also be compared: kam-wināh-īhā-tar 'with less sin', lit. 'more little-sin-fully'.

Some common locational adverbs are azabar (hcpl) 'above' and azēr (hcdl or ʾdl) 'below', andarōn (BYNlwn' / ʾndlwn') 'inside', bērōn (bylwn') 'outside', pērāmōn (pylʾmwn') 'around' and parrōn (plwn' 'away, hence'). Many of these are formed as compounds with the noun rōn (lwn') 'direction' as a second element.

For pronominal adverbs, see the sections on the pronouns of the respective types. For directional adverbs commonly co-occurring with verbs, see the section of preverbs.

=== Verbal morphology ===
Synthetic forms survive only in the present tense, although it does continue to distinguish to a greater or lesser extent four different moods. The past and perfect tenses are expressed periphrastically, even though there might be a few relicts of a synthetic imperfect in early inscriptions, and there may be a single synthetic imperfect form in Manichaean Middle Persian (see the section on The preterite below).

==== Stems ====
A Middle Persian verb has two stems – a present stem and a past stem, which coincides with the past participle. Most other synthetic forms are based on the present stem, but the infinitive uses the past stem (as do a few derivational suffixes, see below). The past stem generally ends in -d or -t (after voiced and voiceless consonants, respectively). Sometimes this is the only difference between the stems – this is common for roots in -š (kuš – kušt, sp. NKSWN-, 'to kill') and is also found e.g. in the verb xwardan (OŠTENtn') 'to eat' (xwar- – xward). However, much more commonly, there are other differences and the exact relationship between the two stems is often unpredictable. For example:

Verb meaning and Aramaeogram	Present stem	Past stem
'to do' (OBYDWN-)	kun-	kard-
'to go away' (OZLWN-)	šaw-	šud-
'to bear' (YBLWN-)	bar-	burd-

Some common patterns of alternation between the final consonants of the two stems are:

Verb meaning and Aramaeogram	Present stem	Past stem
	-z-	-xt
'to run, flow'	E.g. rēz-	rēxt
	-s-, -z-, -y-, -h-	-št, -st
'to want' (BOYHWN-)	E.g. xwāh-	xwast
	-t-, -d-, -n-, -h-	-st
'to bind' (ASLWN-) 'to sit' (YTYBWN-)	E.g. band- nišīn-	bast nišast
	-w-	-ft
'to speak' (YMRRWN-)	E.g. gōw-	guft

Other notable alternations are seen in ward- – wašt 'to turn', dār- – dāšt (YHSNN-) 'to hold', nimāy- – nimūd 'to show', zan- – zad (MHYTWN-) 'to hit'.

Some verbs also derive the past stem merely by the addition of a suffix, which, however, does not consist solely of the consonant -t/d. Most commonly it is -īd (-yt'), but a number of verbs also take -ād (-ʾt') or -ist (-st'):

Verb meaning and Aramaeogram	Present stem	Past stem
'to work'	warz-	warzīd
'to stand' (YKOYMWN-)	est-	estād
'to seem' (MDMEN-)	sah-	sahist

The past stem formations in -īd and -ist are typical of denominative verbs, passives in the suffix -īh- and causatives.

Finally, a few stem pairs are clearly suppletive:

Verb meaning and Aramaeogram	Present stem	Past stem
'to see' (HZYTWN-)	wēn-	dīd
'to come' (YATWN-)	āy-	āmad

Another form of suppletion is found in the verb meaning 'to be, exist', which has the stem h- (spelt HWE-) in the present tense, but in the preterite it uses the forms of the verb būdan 'to become, to be', which has the present stem baw- (often contracted simply to b-) and the past stem būd (spelt YHWWN-).

==== Personal endings and present tense of the three moods ====
===== Overview =====
The present-tense forms of the four moods are formed by adding the following endings to the present stem:

	indicative	imperative	subjunctive	optative
1st sing.	-ēm (sp. -ym) (-am, sp. -m), -om, sp. -wm))		-ān	
2nd sing.	-ēh (sp. -yh, -ē (sp. -yd)	-∅ (-ē, sp. yd, -ydy)	-āy (-ā(h))	-ēš (sp. -yš)
3rd sing.	-ēd (sp. -yt') (-ed, sp. -t')		-ād	-ēh (sp. -yh), -ē (sp. -yd)
1st pl.	-ēm (sp. -ym) (-am (sp. -m), -om (sp. -wm))		-ām	
2nd pl.	-ēd (sp. -yt')	-ēd (sp. -yt')	-ād	
3rd pl.	-ēnd (sp. -ynd) (-and, sp. -nd)		-ānd	-ēnd hē (sp. -ynd HNA)

For example, the verb raftan (SGYTWNtn') 'to go' will be conjugated as rawēm (SGYTWNym), rawē (SGYTWNyd), rawēd (SGYTWNyt'), etc. in the indicative, raw (SGYTWN), etc. in the imperative, rawān (SGYTWNʾn), rawāy (SGYTWNʾy), rawād (SGYTWNʾt), etc. in the subjunctive, and so on.

===== The vowel of the endings =====
The endings containing alternative vowels to ē are not found in Manichaean Middle Persian, except for the 1st person plural -om, which has, conversely, been reported to be the only version there. For the 1st person singular ending, most authors list -ēm as the normal form, but some consider -am to have been the regular ending in non-Manichaean Middle Persian as opposed to the 1st person plural -ēm. Thus, sg. -am : pl.-ēm in Pahlavi would correspond to sg. -ēm : pl. -om in Manichaean. In general, the apparently random variation of the vowels has been interpreted either as relicts of the inflection of minority stem types or, conversely, as foreshadowings of the New Persian form of the endings.

Furthermore, a small number of verbs had alternative contracted forms for the 3rd singular present with no vowel in the ending at all: e.g. kund for expected kunēd of kardan. Verbs for which such forms are attested include daštan (YHSNNtn') 'hold' – dad (dt'), raftan (SGYTWNtn') 'go' – rawd (lpd), burdan (YBLWNtn') 'carry' – bard (bld), čāštan (cʾštn') 'teach' - čāšt (čʾšt'), hōšīdan (hwšytn') 'dry' - hōšt (hwšt') and fragendan (plkndn') 'lay foundations' – fragend (plknd). In addition, the present stem of būdan (YHWWNtn') 'become', baw-, is often shortened to b-: b-ēd (byt').

Although the 2nd singular imperative has no ending, a vowel -ā-' appears in it before enclitics in Manichaean and Psalter Pahlavi, e.g. ahrām-ā-m! (ʾhrʾmʾm) 'raise me up!'

===== Subjunctive and optative =====
The subjunctive forms for persons other than the third occur in Manichaean Middle Persian, but not in Book Pahlavi. The subjunctive may express a wish (in the present tense) or a hypothetical or conditioned event (the latter mostly in the past tenses) The optative is another way to express a wish. However, the same meaning is expressed by combining the present indicative with separate optative particles: ē(w), sp.ʾy(w) in Book Pahlavi (e.g. ē dārēd, sp. ʾy YHSNNyt' 'let him possess it') and hēb in Manichaean (e.h. hēb dārēd hyb dʾryd, the same) The present indicative and the present subjunctive may also express future tense (the former is used especially for near future).

===== Copula =====
The synthetic forms of the copula verb follow mostly the same pattern as other verbs, the present stem consisting of the consonant h- (sp. HWE-) alone: thus, 1st sg. ind. hēm (HWEym) or ham (HWEm), subj. hān, etc. However, the 3rd person singular of the present indicative is ast (sp. AYT), and this latter form is used mostly in the meaning 'to exist'; it is usually (but not always) omitted when the meaning is of pure predication, as in he is a man – ōy mard (OLE GBRA), in contrast to there is a man – mard ast (AYT GBRA). The 3rd plural hēnd is often omitted as well, and even a subjunctive hād may be absent. Moreover, the existential 3rd person singular also has a special contracted negated form: instead of the regular *nē ast (LA AYT), it is nēst (LOYT')

The optative proper is regular: hē (HWEyd). The imperative function, however, appears to be performed by an optative form of the verb būdan (YHWWNtn'), 'to be, become': bāš contracted from bawēš, and in the plural imperative, the same verb is used: bawēd.

Finally, the copula could also occur in enclitic form without the initial h-, although this is not found very often in written texts: kōdak-am (sp. kwtkm) 'I am small'.

===== Imperfect =====
In addition to these endings, P. O. Skjærvø (2009: 219) identifies relicts of the Old Persian imperfect in Inscriptional Pahlavi: the markers, which are added to the present stem, are -ēn for the 1st singular, -ē or -ēd for the 3rd and -om for the 1st plural. However, in the synthetic passive formed with the suffixes -īh- or -īy-, no ending is added at all in the imperfect: gugānīh-∅ 'was destroyed'. There is much uncertainty and debate about the exact interpretations of these and similar forms.

===== Number agreement =====
When a plural subject is inanimate, the verb may remain in the singular instead of agreeing with it, unless individuality is specially emphasised.

==== Periphrastic forms ====
===== Past tenses =====
All the past tenses use periphrastic constructions with the main verb in the past participle form; e.g. raft from the verb raftan (SGYTWN 'go'). The finite auxiliary verb is conjugated for the appropriate person and mood; the rules for person agreement in particular are described in the section on Ergativity in the past tenses. The constructions are as follows:

====== The preterite ======
The preterite is formed by combining the past participle of the verb and the copula h- (HWE-) used as an auxiliary verb conjugated for the appropriate person and mood. The copula is, as usual, dropped in the third singular:

(az) raft hēm ((ANE) SGYTWNt' HWEym) 'I went', but:
(ōy) raft ((OLE) SGYTWNt') 'he went'.

Since the verb h- has no corresponding past participle of the same root, it uses suppletively the past participle of būdan:

(az) būd hēm ((ANE) YHWWNt' / bwt' HWEym) 'I was', but:
(ōy) būd ((OLE) YHWWNt / bwt') 'he was'. This tense expresses an action in the past.

In addition, a synthetically (and suppletively) formed past tense of the copula appears to be found in Manichaean Middle Persian: 3rd person singular anād 'was' and 3rd person plural anānd 'were'. There is no obvious difference in function between this and the ordinary preterite. This has been said to be a relict of the Old Persian imperfect tense, and it has been conjectured that a mysterious Armaeogram HWYTN- occurring in Inscriptional Pahlavi also designates the stem found in this form of the copula.

====== The past preterite ======
The past preterite also uses the past participle, but it differs from the simple preterite in that the copula itself is in the preterite rather than the present here:

(az) raft būd hēm ((ANE) SGYTWNt' YHWWNt' / bwt' HWEym) 'I had gone';

(ōy) raft būd ((OLE) SGYTWNt' YHWWNt' / bwt') '(he) had gone'.

Since Manichaean Middle Persian (and possibly Inscriptional Pahlavi) retains synthetic past (imperfect) forms of the copula, it is also able to use them as auxiliaries in the past preterite construction (which has then been called 'past imperfect', although it does not seem to have a different function from the other construction):

(ōy) raft anād = '(he) had gone'.
(awēšān) raft anānd = '(they) had gone'.

The past preterite expresses an action preceding another action in the past.

====== The perfect ======
The perfect also uses the past participle, but it differs from the preterite in that the auxiliary verb uses is not the copula, but ēstādan (YKOYMWNtn') 'to stand' in the present tense. Thus:

(az) raft ēstēm ((ANE) SGYTWNt' YKOYMWNym) 'I have/am gone'
(ōy) raft ēstēd ((OLE) SGYTWNt' YKOYMWNyt') '(he) has/is gone'.

This tense expresses a past action whose results are still observable in the present.

====== The past perfect ======
The past perfect or pluperfect differs from the simple perfect in that the verb ēstādan itself is in the preterite rather than the present here:

(az) raft ēstād hēm ((ANE) SGYTWNt' YKOYMWNʾt' HWEym) 'I had/was gone';
(ōy) raft ēstād ((OLE) SGYTWNt' YKOYMWNaʾt') '(he) had/was gone'.

This tense expresses a past action whose results were still observable at some point in the past.

====== Past pluperfect ======
Some authors identify yet another form, a past pluperfect:

(az) raft ēstād būd hēm ((ANE) SGYTWNt' YKOYMWNʾt' YHWWNt' / bwt' HWEym) 'I had/was gone';
(ōy) raft ēstād būd ((OLE) SGYTWNt' YKOYMWNʾt' YHWWNt' / bwt') '(he) had/was gone'.

====== Omission of the auxiliary verb ======
The auxiliary būdan is sometimes omitted not only in the 3rd person singular, but even in the plural: u-mān ō padīrag āmad awēšān widerdagān ruwān (APmʾn' OL ptyrk' YATWNt' OLEšʾn' wtltkʾn' lwbʾn') 'and the souls of the departed came to meet us.'

====== Ergativity in the past tenses ======
Like the English and Latin past participles, the Middle Persian past participle describes the logical subject of a verb when the verb is intransitive, but the logical object of the verb when the verb is transitive: e.g. raft (SGYTWNt') '(somebody who is) gone', but dīd (HZYTWNt') '(something that is) seen (by somebody)'. As a result, the construction with the copula (and with the auxiliary ēstādan) has 'active' meaning when the verb is intransitive – tō raft hē, sp. (LK) SGYTWNt' HWEyd, lit. 'you are gone' – but 'passive' meaning when the verb is transitive – (tō) mard dīd, sp. (LK) GBRA HZYTWNt', lit. 'the man is seen (by you)'. In other words, the participant that normally would have been the object is treated as the subject here, and the participant that normally would have been the subject is treated as an oblique modifier. Since in these transitive verb constructions, the participant that is treated like the single argument of an intransitive verb is not the more subject-like one, but the more object-like one, the morphosyntactic alignment of these constructions is ergative. Since this alignment is confined to the past tenses, it is further described as split-ergative.

The most obvious consequence of this that while the verb in a past tense agrees with the (logical) subject if it is intransitive (just as it would in the present tense), it agrees with the (logical) object if it is transitive:

tō mardān dīd hēnd (LK GBRAʾn HZYTWNt' HWEnd) = 'you saw the men', lit. 'by you the men were seen';

Cf. present tense: tō mardān wēnē (LK GBRAʾn HZYTWNyd) = 'you see the men';

Cf. also the past tense of an intransitive verb: tō raft hē (LK SGYTWNt' HWEyd) 'you went'

mardān tō dīd hē (GBRAʾn LK HZYTWNt' HWEyd) = 'The men saw you', lit. 'by the men you were seen';

Cf. present tense: mardān tō wēnēnd (GBRAʾn LK HZYTWNt' HWEnd) = 'the men see you';

Cf. also the past tense of an intransitive verb: mardān raft hēnd (GBRAʾn SGYTWNt' HWEnd) 'the men went'

Another consequence is seen in the case inflection of nominals, inasmuch as it is preserved. In contrast to the use of the cases in the present tense, the ergative construction means that it is the logical object that is in the direct case and the logical subject that is in the oblique case. Thus, originally we would have, e.g. az mardān wēnēm 'I see the men' in the present, but man mard dīd hēnd in the past; mard man wēnēnd 'the men see me' in the present, but mardān az dīd hēm 'the men saw me' in the past. Even after the last vestiges of case inflection in nouns and the stressed forms of the pronouns had been lost and so their forms in ergative and nominative constructions had become identical, the fact that the very frequent pronominal enclitics were restricted to the oblique case meant that their use still reflected the alignment difference between the tenses:

u-t mard dīd (APt GBRA HZYTWNt') = 'and you saw the man'

Cf. present tense: u-t mard wēnēd APt GBRA HZYTWNyt') = 'and the man sees you'

In contrast, *u-t raft hē 'and you went' is impossible, as is *u-t mard dīd hē 'and the man saw you'. That is because only the stressed form of the pronoun can function in the direct case.

Finally, it may be pointed out that the possibility of expressing the logical subject at all appears to have developed later in the perfect tenses with ēstādan than in the preterites with būdan. It is not yet found in Inscriptional and Psalter Pahlavi, nor in Manichaean Middle Persian, where these constructions are impersonal and passive. However, in Book Pahlavi, it is already found regularly, so that clauses like u-t mard dīd ēstēd 'and you have seen the man' are fully possible.

===== Present passive =====
The present tense proper of the verb būdan, bawēm, is also combined with the past participle to express a kind of present passive: dād bawēd (YHBWNt' YHWWNyt') 'it is, will have been given'. As in the ergative construction, the agent can occasionally be expressed with an oblique enclitic, e.g. ā-š kard bawēd 'then it is done by him' (ʾš OBYDWNyt' YHWWNyt').

===== Future periphrasis =====
Albeit rarely, the verb kamistan 'to want' combined with an infinitive may express future tense: dušpādixšāyīh ī awēšān sar kāmēd būdan (dwšSLYTAyh Y OLEšʾn' LOYŠE YCBENyt' YHWWNtn') 'their evil rule will end', lit. 'wants to end'.

==== Aspectual verbal particles ====
There are two particles occurring before the verb which may modify its aspectual meaning (apparently in opposite ways), even though their use is not obligatory.

One of them appears in Pahlavi as be (BRA) and in Manichaean as ba (bʾ). Its earliest meaning seems to have been directional and specifically andative, i.e. 'away, out', and this is still said to be the case in Inscriptional and Psalter Pahlavi as well as in Manichaean, but in Book Pahlavi it also seems to have other meanings, which are less clear and more controversial. It has been argued to express perfective aspect in the past or in the future. For example, mard ī šahr ka-š kas pad pusīh be padīrēd (GBRA y štr' AMTš AYŠ PWN BREyh BRA MKBLWNyt') 'if somebody adopts a man of the kingdom as his son'; Šābuhr be xandīd (šʾpwhl GHBHWNyt') 'Šābuhr laughed'. It also occurs relatively frequently with imperatives in Book Pahlavi, but not in Manichaean Middle Persian.

The other particle is hamē (hmʾy), originally identical to the adverb meaning 'always'. It expresses imperfective and more specifically durative or iterative aspect: kanīzag pad sar ī čāh būd ud ... čahārpāyān rāy āb hamē dād (knyck' PWN LOYŠE y cʾh YHWWNt' ... chʾlpʾdʾn rʾd MYA hmʾy YHBWNt') 'the girl was by the side of the well and was giving water to the animals'. Some have viewed its aspectual use as a late phenomenon indicative of the transition to New Persian.

==== Non-finite verb forms ====
===== Infinitive =====
The infinitive has two versions:

1. a 'long' one that is derived from the past stem by adding -an: e.g. kardan (kartn' / OBYDWNtn')
2. a 'short' one that is identical to the past stem, and thus to the past participle: kard (kart' / OBYDWNt')

It can function syntactically as a (verbal) noun: pad griftan ī Ardaxšīr (PWN OHDWNtn' Y ʾrthšyr) 'in order to seize Ardaxšīr' (lit. 'for the seizing of Ardaxšīr'), hangām ī xwarišn xwardan (hngʾm y OŠTENšn' OŠTENtn') 'the time to eat food' (lit. the time of food eating').

===== Participles =====
The past participle, which coincides with the past stem. It has passive meaning when the verb is transitive, but active meaning when the verb is intransitive: kard (krt' or OBYDWNt') 'made' but āxist (KDMWNt') 'risen'. It is most commonly used predicatively, but it can also be nominalised: duzīd (dwcyd) 'the stolen (goods)'. If it is an attribute modifier instead, it is usually introduced by the relative particle: čiš ī widard (MNDOM Y wtlt') 'a thing that has passed away, vanished'.

An extended form of the past participle is produced by the addition of the suffix -ag (-k) to the past stem. This form is used attributively more often than the previous one: duxt ī padīriftag (BRTE Y MKBLWNtk') 'an adopted daughter' and is also frequently nominalised: nibištag (YKTYBWNtk') 'something written, a document' (cf. Latin scriptum, English writ).

There is also a present active participle derived from the present stem with the ending in -ān (ʾn): e.g. griyān (BKYWNʾn), gldʾn), 'crying'. It may occur as a gerund – zarduxšt griyān passox guft (zrtwxšt gldʾn pshw' gwpt), 'Zarasthustra answered, weeping.' and is the usual verb form governed by the verb niwistan (nwystn) 'to begin', which, however, is mostly typical of Manichaean (albeit attested in Psalter Pahlavi). These constructions are rare in Book Pahlavi. Historically, the derivational deverbal suffix -endag / -andag (-ndk') as in sōzendag (swcndk' 'burning') contains the Proto-Indo-European present active participle suffix and it does retain such a meaning, so the adjective derived with has also been called a 'participle'. So have deverbal adjectives formed with the productive suffix -āg (-ʾk') as in sazāg (scʾk) 'fitting', which also have very similar semantics (see the section on Word formation). Both of these latter are mostly used attributively.

The suffix -išn (-šn) generally forms deverbal nouns of action from the present stem of the verb as in kunišn (kwnšn') 'doing, deed, action' from kardan (OBYDWNtn' / krtn') 'to do'. However, such formations also function in predicative position as gerundives and have since been referred to as 'participles of necessity': u-š čē kunišn 'And what is he to do?', lit. 'What is an (appropriate) action for him?'; mardōmān ... mizd ī mēnōy bē nē hilišn (ANŠWTAʾn mzd Y mynwd BRE LA ŠBKWNšn') 'people must not relinquish their reward in the spiritual world'. Indeed, they have come to resemble adjectives in that they can be inflected for degree: zanišntar (MHYTWNšntl) 'more worthy of being hit/killed'.

===== Voice =====
The periphrastic present passive construction with a past participle and būdan in the present tense (dād bawēd, 'is given') has already been mentioned in the section Present passive. The corresponding ergative preterite constructions and ergative perfect tense constructions with ēstādan 'stand' are not really passive, since they do not contrast with an active form in the same tense and are the standard and only way of expressing these tenses. Nevertheless, they can still be used without an overt agent, resulting in a passive meaning: pus ... ōzad (BRE YKTLWNt') 'the son ... was killed', mardōm ... xwānd hēnd (ANŠWTA ... KRYTWNt' HWEnd) 'the people ... were called'.

Another periphrastic way of expressing the passive is by using a third person plural 'they' as an impersonal subject: kas pad wēmārīh nē mīrēd bē pad zarmānīh ayāb ōzanēnd (AYŠ PWN wymʾryh LA BRE YMYTWNyt' PWN zlmʾnyh ʾdwp YKTLWNynd) 'nobody will die of illness, but (only) from of old age or they will be killed (lit. or they kill them)'.

However, there is also a synthetic passive form derived from the present stem with the suffix -īh- (-yh-), in older texts such as the Pahlavi Psalter also -īy- (sp. -yd-). The vowel might have been shortened in later Middle Persian pronunciation. The corresponding past stem may end in -ist or in -īd. Some examples are dārīhēd (YHSNNyhyt') 'is held' (of dāštan, present stem dār-, 'to hold'), yazīhīd (YDBHWNyhyt') 'was recited' (of yaštan, present stem yaz-, 'to recite, celebrate'). If the base verb has the factitive/causative suffix -ēn- (-yn-), it is removed before the addition of -īh-: rawāgēnīdan (lwbʾkynytn') 'propagate' > rawāgīhistan 'be propagated' (lwbʾkyhystn')

===== Possession =====
Middle Persian does not have a verb 'to have'. Instead, possession is expressed by stating the existence of the possessed object using the verb 'to be' and by treating the possessor as an oblique argument (inflecting it in the oblique case, if possible): man paygāl ast (L pygʾl AYT') 'To me, a cup exists' = 'I have a cup'; xwāstag ī-š ast (NKSYA Yš AYT') 'the property which he has', lit. 'which exists to him'.

=== Preverbs ===
Certain adverbial particles are combined with verbs to express direction, while remaining separate words. The most important ones are the following:

Preverb	Meaning
abar (QDM)	'up', 'over', 'onto'
ul (LALA)	'up'
frōd (plwt')	'down'
andar (BYN)	'in'
be (BRA)	'away', 'out'
frāz (prʾc)	'forth'
abāz (LAWHL)	'back', 'again'

Some of these (abar and andar) function as prepositions as well.

=== Prepositions ===
The most common simple prepositions are:

Preposition	Meaning
abar (QDM)	'on'
azēr (ʾcdl)	'under'
az (MN', hc)	'from'
ō (OL)	'to'
andar (BYN)	'in'
pad (PWN)	'at, to, for'
tar (LCDr')	'over', 'through'
abāg (LWTE)	'with'
ǰomā (ywmʾy)	'with'
be (BRE), Manichaean ba (bʾ)	'without', 'besides'
tā (OD), Manichaean dā (dʾ)	'until'

The special postposed forms of pad, ō and az with a resumptive pronoun -(i)š – padiš (ptš), awiš (ʾwbš), aziš (hcš) – have already been mentioned in the section on pronouns.

Certain adverbs and nouns can be used as prepositions, in which case they usually (but not always) use the relative particle or the preposition az to introduce the noun: thus the adverb pēš (LOYN') can be extended as pēš ī 'in front of', pēš az 'before'. In turn, the adverb may be preceded by a preposition: ō pēš ī. A noun does not necessarily require a preceding preposition: mayān ī (mdyʾn Y) '(in) the middle of'. In this way, many prepositional meanings are expressed: 'before' (pēš ī, sp. LOYN' Y), 'after' (pas ī AHL), 'around' (pērāmōn ī, sp. pylʾmwn' Y), 'beside' (kanārag ī, sp. knʾlk' Y), 'near, close to' (nazdīk ī, sp. nzdyk' Y), 'beside, around' (pad sar ī, sp. PWN LOYŠE Y), 'except, apart from' ǰud az (sp. ywdt' MN'), etc. Instead of being introduced by ī, the component nominal phrase may also be placed before the noun, so it becomes possible to speak of an 'ambiposition': az / ō ... rōn (MN / OL ... lwn') 'from / in the direction of' (from rōn 'direction'); a similar structure is seen in bē ... enyā (BRA ... ʾynyʾ) 'except', where enyā 'otherwise' may also be omitted.

While prepositions can remain stranded after their complements because of some syntactic processes mentioned above, there is also a regular postposition: rāy (lʾd), meaning 'for (the sake of)', 'because of', 'about', 'to'. The postpositional phrase can also be preceded by a preposition: az ... rāy 'because of', pad ... rāy 'concerning, in order to'. In some other combinations that have been identified as 'ambipositions', the first element can also be dropped, causing the second one to occur as a postposition: such is the case in (az) ... hammis(t) ('together with') and (bē) ... tā 'except'.

=== Conjunctions ===
The most common coordinating conjunctions are:

Conjunction	Meaning
ud (W); u- (AP-) in front of pronominal enclitics	'and'
ayāb (Pahlavi ʾdwp, Manichaean ʾyʾb)	'or'
Pahlavi be (BRE), Manichaean ba (bʾ)	'but'
Manichaean only: anāy or anē (ʾnʾy)	'but'

The word ā- (ʾ) 'then' may be described as a demonstrative adverb, but it, too, operates as a sentence connector or introducing particle much like u-, albeit less frequently: an important function of both seems to be to 'support' a pronominal enclitic, and ā- generally occurs with one, e.g. ā-š dīd (ʾš HZYTWNt') 'then he saw'.

The common subordinating conjunctions are:

Conjunction	Meaning
agar (HT)	'if'
čē (ME)	'because'
čiyōn (cygwn')	1. 'as, like' 2. 'because' 3. 'as soon as'
ka (AMT)	'when', 'if', 'although'
kū (AYK)	1. 'that' 2. 'so that' 3. 'than'
tā (OD)	1. 'until' 2. 'so that'

The conjunction ud may be reinforced with the particle ham (hm): ham abar ahlawān ud ham abar druwandān (hm QDM ʾhlwbʾn W hm QDM dlwndʾn) 'both for the righteous and for the unrighteous'.

=== Particles ===
The particles are:

1. nē (LA) 'not', a negative particle; e.g. mardōm ham nē dēw (ANŠWTA HWEm LA ŠDYA) 'I am human, not a demon.' As already mentioned, it merges with the verb form ast (AYT) 'exists, there is' in the contraction nēst' (LOYT') 'doesn't exist, there isn't'.
2. ma or mā (AL) 'do not', a prohibitative particle preceding verbs in the imperative and the conjunctive: ān xwāstag ma stan! (ZK NKSYA AL YNSBWN) 'Do not take this thing!'
3. -(i)z (-(y)c) 'also, too, even'. The vowel-initial version is used after consonants. This particle is enclitic and appended to whatever is being emphasised: ēn-iz paydāg (ZNEc pytʾk') 'This, too, is clear.'

=== Word formation ===
==== Suffixes that form nouns ====
The most productive suffixes that form nouns are

===== Action noun suffixes =====
1. -išn (-šn') is by far the most productive suffix that forms action nouns and nouns with related meanings from the present stems of verbs: menīdan (mynytn') 'to think' > menišn (mynšn') 'thinking, thought', xwardan (OŠTENtn') 'to eat' > xwarišn (OŠTENšn') 'food'. The verbal noun in -isn (-šn) also functions in predicative position as a gerundive, expressing that the action 'ought to be' performed: andar hamahlān ... hučašm bawišn (BYN hmʾlʾn ... hwcšm bwšn) 'among comrades ... one ought to be benevolent'.
2. -ag (-k) forms nouns (action nouns, but often with various concrete meanings) from verbs (both stems) and numerals: widardan (wtltn') 'pass, cross' > widarag (wtlg) 'path, passage', čāštan (cʾštn') 'teach' > čāštag (cʾštk) 'teaching', haft (hp̄t') 'seven' > haftag (hp̄tk) 'week'

This suffix is also thought to have had diminutive meaning and appears to have been added to already existing nouns with no change in meaning (ǰām > ǰāmag 'glass') or with an unpredictable change (čašm, sp. AYNE, 'an eye' > čašmag, sp. cšmk' 'a spring, well'). As such, it was a very productive and expanding suffix. It is identical to an adjective-forming suffix, and that it was its original function; on that, see the next section.

===== Abstract noun suffixes =====
1. -īh (-yh) is by far the most productive suffix that forms abstract nouns from adjectives, nouns and rarely from verbs: tārīg or tārīk (tʾryk) 'dark' > tārīgīh (tʾrykyh) 'darkness'; dōst (dwst') 'friend' > dōstīh (dwstyh) 'friendship'; ast (AYT') 'exists' > astīh (AYTyh) 'existence' It can be combined with the action noun suffix -išn as -išnīh (-šnyh): drō-gōwišnīh (KDBA YMRRWNšnyh / dlwb' YMRRWNšnyh) 'speaking lies':
2. An unproductive suffix forming abstract nouns from adjectives is -āy (-ʾd), most commonly expressing size or degree along a certain dimension: pahn (pʾhn) 'wide' > pahnāy (phnʾd) 'width'.

===== Agent noun suffixes =====
1. -ār (-ʾl) is a productive suffix that forms agent nouns from the past stems of verbs: dādan (YHBWNtn') 'give, create' > dādār (dʾtʾl) 'creator'. There are some surprising exceptions where the meaning is passive: griftan (OHDWNtn') 'seize' > griftār (glptʾl) 'prisoner'.
  The likewise productive suffix -āg (-ʾk) has also been said to derive agent nouns from verbs, but they might be seen as adjectives as well and are treated in the section on adjectives.
2. -gar (-kl) and -gār (-kʾl), both occasionally appearing with an initial ī, productively derive nouns from nouns, expressing the meaning 'doer of something', as well as adjectives from nouns meaning 'doing something': warz (wlc) 'work, farming' > warzīgar (wlcykl) 'worker, farmer'; wināh (wnʾs) 'sin' > wināhgār 'sinner' (wnʾskl), ziyān (zydʾn') 'harm' > ziyāngār (zydʾnkʾl) 'harmful'. When the base noun ends in the suffix -ag, both the final consonant of the stem and the initial consonant of the suffix appear as /k/: kirbag (krpk') 'good deed' > kirbakkar (krpkkl) 'doer of good deeds, beneficent'.
3. -bān (pʾn') productively forms nouns meaning somebody in charge of what the base noun designates, a caretaker: stōr (stwl) 'horse' > stōrbān (stwlpʾn') 'groom'.
4. -bed (pt') forms titles with a similar meaning to the above suffix, but with a nuance of power and possession rather than caretaking: spāh (spʾh) 'army' > spāhbed (spʾhpt') 'army commander'.
5. -yār (-dʾl) is a rare suffix with a somewhat similar meaning to the previous one, as seen in šahr (štr') > šahryār (štr'dʾl).
6. -(a)gān (-kʾn') is a rare suffix that derives nouns from other nouns; the meaning is of a person or thing connected to what the base noun designates: wāzār (wʾcʾl) 'market' > wāzāragān ( wʾcʾlkʾn') 'merchant'

===== Place nouns =====
1. -(e/i)stān (stʾn') is a productive suffix that forms place nouns: asp (SWSYA) 'horse' > aspestān (ʾs̄pstʾn') 'horse stable', hindūg (hndwk') 'Indian' > hindūstān (hndwstʾn') 'India'. It is also included in the names of seasons.
2. -dān (-dʾn') is a rare suffix forming place nouns: ast(ag) (ʾstk') 'bone' > astōdān (ʾstw(k)dʾn') 'ossuary'
3. -īgān (-ykʾn') apparently forms collective and place nouns: māh (BYRH) 'moon, month' > māhīgān 'month' (BYRHykʾn), šāh (MLKA) 'king' > šāhīgān (šhykʾn') 'palace'.

===== Diminutive suffix =====
The diminutive suffix is -īzag (-yck'). E.g. murw (mwlw) 'bird' > murwīzag (mwlwyck') 'birdie'.

It has been conjectured that also the abovementioned suffix -ag (-k) had the same meaning, but it is difficult to find unambiguous attestations of this usage. Adjectives have their own diminutive suffix, on which see below.

===== Feminine suffix =====
Feminine gender could be expressed in proper names by -ag: J̌am > J̌amag. It could also be expressed by the Avestan suffixes -ānīy / -ēnīy: ahlaw 'righteous' > ahlawēnīy 'righteous woman'.

==== Suffixes that form adjectives ====
===== Adjectives derived from nominals =====
1. -īg (-yk'), sometimes possibly -īk: derives adjectives from nouns, often with a meaning 'belonging to' and 'originating from', but also 'having': āb (MYA) 'water' > ābīg (ʾp̄yk') 'aquatic'; Pārs (pʾls) 'Fars' > pārsīg (pʾlsyk') 'Persian'; zōr (zʾwl) 'power' > zōrīg (zʾwlyk') 'powerful'; nazd (nzd) 'vicinity' > nazdīk (nzdyk') 'close, near';
2. When the adjective is derived from a geographical name, the suffix -īg is often preceded by -āy- (-ʾd-): hrōm (hlwm) 'Rome' > hrōmāyīg (hlwmʾdyk') 'Roman'; Asūrestān 'Assyria' > asūrāyīg 'Assyrian'. That suffix -āy also occurs alone in the noun hrōmāy, 'a Roman'.
3. -ōmand, -mand (-ʾwmnd, -mnd): derives adjectives meaning 'having something', 'full of something': ōz (ʾwc) 'strength' > ōzōmand (ʾwc ʾwmnd) 'strong'; xwarrah (GDE) 'fortune, glory' > xwarrahōmand (GDE ʾwmnd) 'fortunate, glorious', šōy (šwd) 'husband > šōymand (šwdmnd) 'having a husband';
4. -(ā)wand or -(ā)wend, spelt -(ʾwnd) (in Manichaean also -ʾwynd) is a rare, originally older version of the previous suffix and derives adjectives from nouns, often with the same meaning as -ōmand, but sometimes expressing a more general connection as in xwēš (NPŠE) 'own' > xwēšāwand (hwyšʾwnd) 'relative'.
5. -gen or -gēn, spelt -k(y)n', is a rare suffix similar in function to -ōmand.
6. -war (-wl) and -wār (-wʾl) derive adjectives from nouns, expressing some kind of connection to what the noun designates, and these adjectives may in turn be converted into nouns. E.g. kēn (kyn) 'revenge' > kēnwar (kynwl) 'vengeful', asp (ŠWŠYA) 'horse' > aswār (PLŠYA, ʾspwʾl, aswbʾl) 'equestrian > horseman'.
  According to some descriptions, -wār (-wʾl) also derives adverbs from adjectives and nouns: sazagwār (sckwʾl) 'fittingly', xwadāywār (hwtʾdwʾl) 'in a lordly manner'.
7. -ēn (-yn') is a productive suffix that derives adjectives expressing the material something is made of: zarr (ZHBA) 'gold' > zarrēn (ZHBA-yn') 'golden'
8. -ag (-k'): besides forming nouns, this suffix also derives adjectives from nouns and the past stem of verbs: tišn (tyšn') 'thirst' > tišnag (tyšnk') 'thirsty'. Sometimes it is also productively added to an existing adjective with no apparent change of meaning: wad, sp. SLYA > wadag, sp. wtk' 'bad, evil'
9. -ōg (-wk') is a rare suffix which, like the previous one, is added to existing adjectives without a noticeable change in meaning, although they may also be converted into nouns.
10. -ān (-ʾn') forms possessive adjectives of names and, in particular, patronymics: ayādgār ī Zarērān (ʾbydʾt Y zryrʾn) 'memoir of Zarēr'; Ardaxšīr (ʾrthšyr) > Ardaxšīrān (ʾrthšyrʾn) 'son of Ardaxšīr'; not to be confused with the present participle suffix;
11. The suffix -agān (-kʾn') form patronymics as well: Pābag (pʾpk') > Pābagān (pʾpkʾn') 'son of Pābag/Pāpak';
12. As already mentioned, -gānag derives adjectives from numerals with the meaning '-fold'.
13. The suffix -ak (-k') formed diminutive adjectives: and (ʾnd) 'so much' > andak (ʾndk') 'a little'.

===== Suffixes that derive adjectives from verbs =====
1. -āg (-ʾk') is a productive suffix that derives adjectives from the present stems of verbs to describe the performer of the action of the verb; these adjectives are often used as nouns and have been described as agent nouns as well. For example, dānistan (YDOYTWNstn') 'to know' > dānāg (dʾnʾk') 'a knowing one, a wise man'.
2. -(a/e)ndag (-ndk', -yndk') is an unproductive suffix that has the same meaning as the above: zī(wi)stan zywstn' 'to live' > zīndag zywndk' 'alive, living'.
3. As already mentioned, there is also a present active participle ending in -ān (-ʾn'), with the same meaning as the above two. The boundary between participles and derived adjectives is not clear.

==== Suffixes that form verbs ====
1. The suffix -ēn- (-yn-) and less commonly -ān-, whose past stem always ends in -īd yt), has the following functions:

– It transforms nominal parts of speech into verbs with factitive meaning: pērōz (pylwc) 'victorious' > pērōzēnīdan (pylwcynytn') 'to make victorious';

– It makes verbs, to whose present stem it is added, into transitive verbs with causative meaning: tarsīdan (tlsytn') 'to be afraid' > tarsēnīdan (tlsynytn') 'to scare'

Apart from that, factitive verbs could be formed simply by creating a new past stem in -īdan: nām (ŠM) 'name' > nāmīdan 'to name'. More commonly, phrasal verbs were used instead as in nām kardan. On the other hand, there still survived some intransitive-transitive verb pairs with quality and quantity differences in the root, where the transitive one usually has the vowel ā: intr. nibastan (ŠKBHWNstn'), nibay- 'to lie down' – tr. nibāstan (npʾstn'), nibāy- 'to lay down'; intr. nišastan, nišīn- 'to sit (down) – tr. nišāstan, nišān- 'to seat' (both spelt with the Armaeogram YTYBWNstn', but distinguished in the phonetic spellings nšstn' – nšʾstn').

2. There is also a suffix that forms intransitive verbs from transitive ones. Specifically, it derives present verb stems from transitive past stems in -ft and -xt, but apparently leaves the two verbs identical in the past stem. In Manichaean, the suffix is -s and removes the preceding dental of the past stem: buxtan (present stem bōz-) 'save' > present stem buxs- 'be saved'. In Pahlavi, the suffix is -t-; in other words, the new present stem coincides with the past one: bōxtan, sp. bwhtn', (present stem bōz-) 'save' > present stem bōxt- 'be saved'

==== Prefixes ====
===== Nominal prefixes =====
1. a(n)-, sp. ʾ(n)-, expresses negation or absence of something. Simple negation is found in examples like purnāy (pwlnʾd) 'adult' > aburnāy (ʾpwlnʾd) 'non-adult', dōstīh (dwstyh) 'friendship, amity' > adōstīh (ʾdwstyh) 'enmity', ēr (ʾyl) 'Iranian, Zoroastrian' > anēr (ʾnyl), 'non-Iranian', 'non-Zoroastrian'.

However, when added to most nouns, the prefix a(n)- converts them into adjectives or nouns meaning 'lacking something': kanārag (knʾlk') 'border' > akanārag (ʾknʾlk') 'borderless' It can also produce adjectives when added to present verb stems, indicating non-performance of the action: dānistan (YDOYTWNstn') 'to know' > adān (ʾdʾn') 'ignorant'.

2. abē-, sp. ʾp̄y is added to nouns to form adjectives expressing the lack of something, which also one of the functions of the previous suffix. Hence, they can even occur with the same stems and more or less the same meanings: bīm 'fear' > abēbīm (ʾp̄ypym) as well as simply abīm (ʾp̄ym) 'fearless'.

3. ham- (hm-) expresses togetherness and sameness. It, too converts nouns into adjectives or nouns meaning 'having / belonging to the same X': e.g. kār (kʾl) 'deed, labour' > hamkār (hmkʾl) 'collaborator'.

4. ǰud- (ywdt-) has partly the opposite meaning to ham-, transforming nouns into adjectives or nouns meaning 'having / belonging to a different/opposite X', e.g. kāmag (kʾmk') 'desire' > ǰudkāmag (ywdt' kʾmk') 'disagreeing', lit. 'having a different desire'. However, it can also have the meaning 'keeping X away', as in dēw (ŠDYA 'demon') > ǰud-dēw (ywdtŠDYA) 'keeping the demons away', 'anti-demonic'. Finally, it has a meaning akin to abē- in cases like ǰud-āb (ywdt'MYA) 'waterless'. It is also an independent word meaning 'separate', 'different', so it can be viewed as the first member of a compound as well.

5. hu- (hw-) can derive nouns from other nouns to express the meaning 'good X', e.g. pādixšāy (ŠLYTA) 'king' > hupādixšāy (hwpʾthšʾd) 'good king'. Far more commonly, however, it forms adjectives and nouns meaning 'having good X': e.g. bōy (bwd) 'smell' > hubōy (hwbwd) 'fragrant'; sraw (slwb') 'word' > husraw (hwslwb') 'having good fame'.

6. duš- / dus / duǰ- (sp. dwš-, dw(s)-), with the second allomorph occurring before /s/ and the third one before voiced stops, has the opposite meaning to the previous prefix: it forms adjectives and nouns meaning 'having bad X', or rarely, simply 'bad X'. For example, dušpādixšāy (dwšpʾthšʾd) 'bad king', dusraw (dwslwb') 'infamous', dēn (dyn') > duǰdēn (Pahlavi dwšdyn', Manichaean dwjdyn) 'infidel'

7. Finally, a few adjectives begin in pad- (PWN-) and meaning 'having' or 'associated with': e.g. parrag (plk') 'wing' > pad-parrag (PWN plk') 'having wings'; drō (KDBA, dlwb') 'a lie' > pad-drō (PWN dlwb) 'lying'.

===== Verbal prefixes =====
Some adverbial particles can co-occur with verbs, but remain separate words; on these, see the section Preverbs. Earlier Indo-European verbal prefixes have coalesced with the following roots and their original meaning is hardly ever discernible, even though they are very frequent. Thus, we have the following elements:

1. ā- expressing approaching something: burdan (YBLWMtn') 'carry' > āwurdan (YHYTYWNtn') 'bring', āmadan (YATWNtn') and madan (mtn'), both meaning 'to come'.
2. ab(e)/ap- expressing movement away from something: : burdan (YBLWMtn') 'carry' > appurdan (YHNCLWNtn') 'steal'
3. fra- expressing movement forward: franaftan (plnptn') 'go (forth), proceed, depart'.
4. gu- expressing togetherness: gumēxtan (gwmyhtn') '(co-)mix'.
5. ham- and han- (the latter variant before non-labial consonants), also expressing togetherness or connection, 'with'. This prefix still occurs with the same form in nouns, but in verbs its meaning is seldom obvious: bastan (ASLWNtn') 'bind, tie' > hambastan (hnbstn') 'bind together, encircle, compose', but also hambastan (hnbstn') 'collapse', hanǰāftan (hncʾptn') 'complete, conclude'.
6. ni- expressing movement downwards: nišastan (YTYBWNstn') 'sit (down)', nibastan (ŠKBHWNstn'), 'lie (down)', nibištan (YKTYBWNstn') 'write (down)'
7. ō- expressing bringing an action to completion: zadan (MHYTWNtn') 'hit' > ōzadan (YKTLWNtn') 'kill'
8. par- expressing movement 'around': bastan (ASLWNtn') 'bind, tie' > parwastan (plwatn') 'surround, enclose'; pargandan (plkndn') 'scatter, disperse'.
9. pay- expressing direction towards something: bastan (ASLWNtn') 'bind, tie' > paywastan (ptwstn') 'join, connect'
10. us-, uz- expressing direction upwards or outwards: uzīdan (ʾwcytn') 'go out, end, expend', uzmūdan (ʾzmwtn') 'try out, experiment'
11. wi- expressing movement away or apart from something: rēxtan (lyhtn') 'flow' > wirēxtan (OLYKWNtn') 'escape, run away'.

==== Compounds ====
Compounding is very productive. The following types are common:

1. bahuvrihi or possessive compound, a compound adjective or noun of the structure Modifier + Noun, designating the possessor of what the second member designates:

- wad-baxt (wt' bʾxt'), lit. 'bad' (SLYA) + 'fortune' = 'who has ill fortune', i.e. 'unfortunate';

pād-uzwān (pʾtʾwzwʾn'), lit. 'protected' (NTLWNt') + 'tongue' (ŠNA) = 'who has protected tongue', i.e. 'reticent';
čahār-pāy (chʾlpʾd), lit. 'four' (ALBA) + 'leg' (LGLE), 'which has four legs', i.e. 'quadruped, animal'.

The modifier is usually an adjective or another part of speech that typically modifies nouns.

2. A determinative compound noun of the structure Modifier + Noun, designating a subset of the class that the second member designates:

kār-nāmag (kʾl nʾmk'), lit. 'deed' + 'book', a 'book of deeds', i.e. a biography. The modifier is usually a noun, less cderived/ borrowed words from Middle Persian

commonly an adjective as in weh-dēn (ŠPYLdyn'), lit. 'good' + 'religion' = 'Zoroastrianism'.

3. A determinative compound adjective or noun of the structure Modifier + Deverbal Noun or Participle:

anāg-kerdār (ʾnʾk' kltʾl), lit. 'evil' + 'doer' = 'evildoer';
Ōhrmazd-dād (ʾwhrmzd dʾt), lit. 'Ahuramazda' + 'given' (YHBWNt') = 'given, created by Ahuramazda'.

4. A determinative compound adjective or noun of the structure Modifier + Present Verb Stem. The meaning is of an agent noun:

axtar (ʾhtl) 'star', āmārdan (ʾmʾldn') 'calculate' > axtar-(ā)mār, lit. 'star' + 'calculate' = 'astrologer'

An uncommon type is the copulative (dvandva) type that combines two stems on equal terms – some possible examples are:

rōz-šabān (lwc špʾn), lit. 'day' (YWM) + 'night' (LYLYA) + -ān = 'a 24-hour period'; and
uštar-gāw-palang (wštlgʾwp̄plng), lit. 'camel' (GMRA) + 'ox' (TWRA) + 'leopard' (płng).

=== Numerals ===
The numeral system is decimal. The numerals usually do not inflect, but may take the plural ending when preceding the noun they modify, e.g. Manichaean sēnān anōšagān 'the three immortals'. The numerals are usually spelt in Pahlavi as digits, but there are also Aramaeograms for the cardinals from 1 to 10.

==== Cardinal numerals ====
The cardinal ones from one to ten are:

number	pronunciation	Aramaeogram
1	ē(w) yak (Manichaean yk)	none for yak; 'phonetic' ʾdwk' HD for ē(w)
2	dō	TLYN
3	sē	TLTA
4	čahār	ALBA
5	panǰ (Manichaean panz)	HWMŠA, HWMŠYA
6	šaš	ŠTA
7	haft	ŠBA
8	hašt	TWMNYA
9	nō	TŠA, TŠYA
10	dah	ASLA, ASLYA

The teens are mostly formed by combining the relevant number of units and the word dah 'ten', but there are some voicings, epentheses of /z/, elisions and unpredictable alternations at the morpheme boundaries.

number	pronunciation
11	yāzdah
12	dwāzdah
13	sēzdah
14	čahārdah
15	panzdah, pānzdah
16	šazdah, šāzdah
17	hafdah
18	hašdah
19	nōzdah

The tens often bear some resemblance to the corresponding units and sometimes end in -ād or -ad, but often are not synchronically analysable:

number	pronunciation
10	dah
20	wīst
30	sīh
40	čihl or čihil
50	panǰah
60	šast
70	haftād
80	aštād, haštād
90	nawad
100	sad

The hundreds combine the relevant unit and the word sad 'hundred' (e.g. hašt sad for 800), except for 200, which is duwēst. One thousand is hazār, and multiples of it are formed again on the pattern hašt hazār and so on, but there is also a special numeral for 10 000, bēwar (spelt bywl). Compound numerals may be formed with or without the conjunction ud 'and': čihl ud čahār or čihl čahār.

Fractions simply conjoin the cardinal numerals of the denominator and the numerator: sē-yak (ī ...) 'one third (of ...)', and may also take the 'indefinite article' -ēw. Another notable derivation is the one in -gānag meaning '-fold', e.g. sēgānag (3-kʾnk) 'triple'.

Cardinal numerals may precede or follow the noun; the noun is usually in the singular, but may be in the plural, too.

==== Ordinal numerals ====
Ordinal numerals are formed regularly by adding the ending -om (sp. -wm) to the corresponding cardinal numeral: e.g. haft-om (7-wm) 'seven-th'. After vowels, a semivowel is inserted before -om: -y- after the front vowels e and i, and -w- after the back vowel o: thus, 3rd can be sē-y-om, 30th is sī-y-om, 2nd is dō-w-om.

While this regular pattern can be applied even to the first three numerals, they also have more common irregular variants: fradom (pltwm) 'first', dudīgar or didīgar (dtykl) 'second', sidīgar (stykl) 'third'. The final ar may be absent in Manichaean texts: dudīg (dwdyg) and sidīg (sdyg). Furthermore, 'first' may also occur as naxust (nhwst') and nazdist (nzdst') and 'second' may also occur as did (TWB, dt'), which also means 'another', and didom. 'Fourth' can also be tasom (tswm).

Like the cardinal numbers, the ordinal ones can occur before or after the noun, and in the latter case, they may be linked to it by the relative particle ī.

=== Syntax ===
The usual word order is subject – object – verb, although there are deviations from it. As already mentioned, genitive and adjective modifiers usually precede their heads if unmarked as such, but adjectives can also be placed after their heads, and a modifier introduced by the relative particle ī is placed after its head, unless appended to a demonstrative pronoun modifying the phrase head (pronoun + ī + modifier + head). The language uses prepositions, but they may end up as postpositions if their logical complements are enclitic pronouns or relative pronouns. The enclitic pronouns are normally appended to the first word of the clause. Yes/no questions are only distinguished from statements by means of intonation. Wh-questions do not need to be introduced by the interrogative word either: war ... kū kard ēstēd? (wl ... AYK krt' YKOYMWNyt') 'Where has the shelter been made?'

Certain verbs are used impersonally: the logical subject is absent or oblique, and the action is expressed by an infinitive or a dependent clause with a verb in the subjunctive. Thus the present tense of abāyistan 'be necessary, fitting' is used as follows: abāyēd raftan (ʾp̄ʾdt' SGYTWNtn' ), 'it is necessary to go'. Other verbs used like this, obligatorily or optionally, are sahistan (MDMENstn') 'seem', saz- (sc) 'be proper' (present tense only), šāyistan (šʾdstn') 'be possible', kāmistan (YCBENstn') 'want' (constructed like 'be desirable to s.o.') and wurrōyistan (HYMNN-stn') 'believe' (constructed like 'seem credible to s.o.'). So are some nouns such as tuwān 'might, power': tuwān raftan (twbʾn' SGYTWNtn') 'one can go'.

There are many phrasal verbs consisting of a nominal part of speech and a relatively abstract verb, most commonly kardan (OBYDWNtn' / krtn') 'do', sometimes also dādan (YHBWNtn') 'to give', burdan (YBLWNtn') 'to bear', zadan (MHYTWNtn') 'to hit', etc. Some examples are duz kardan (dwc krtn') 'to steal', lit. 'to do a theft', framān dādan (plmʾn' YHBWNtn'), 'to command', lit. 'to give a command', āgāh kardan (ʾkʾs krtn') 'inform', lit. 'make informed'.

The plural number was used in reference to kings, both in the first person (by the kings themselves), in the second person (when addressing a king) and in the third person (when referring to kings, e.g. awēšān bayān, sp. OLEšʾn' ORHYAʾn, 'Their Majesty', originally only the oblique case form). An action performed by a superior was introduced by the dummy verb framūdan 'order' governing an infinitive of the main verb: framāyē xwardan! (prmʾdyd OŠTENʾn) 'deign eat!'.

=== Lexis ===
In contrast to the numerous Arameograms in Pahlavi spelling, there are not many actual borrowings from Aramaic in Middle Persian; indeed, the number of borrowings in the language in general is remarkably small. An exception is the Middle Persian Psalter, which is a relatively literal translation of the Peshitta and does contain a sizable number of theology-related loans from Syriac: e.g. purkānā 'redemption'.

Pahlavi often has more forms borrowed from Parthian than Manichaean does: e.g. Pahlavi zamestān (zmstʾn') vs Manichaean damestān (dmstʾn) 'winter'. Naturally, theological terms borrowed from Avestan occur in Zoroastrian Pahlavi, sometimes even in the original script, but often in 'Pahlavised' form or as loan translations:

Avestan	Pahlavi	approximate translation
aṣ̌awwan (cf. Old Persian artāvan)	ahlaw, sp. ʾhlwb' (but ardā, sp. ʾltʾy as an epithet)	'righteous'
daēnā	dēn, sp. dyn'	'religion'
frauuaṣ̌i-	frawahr, sp. plwʾhl fraward, sp. plwlt'	'fravashi; immortal soul/guardian angel'
gaēθiia-	gētīy / gētīg, sp. gytyd, late gytyk, Manichaean gytyg; but note: gēhān, sp. gyhʾn' 'world (of mortals)'	'material'
gāθā	gāh, sp. gʾs	'Gatha, hymn'
mainiiu-	mēnōy / mēnōg, sp. mynwd, late mynwk, Manichaean mynwg	'spirit', 'spiritual'

== Samples ==
=== A sample of Inscriptional Middle Persian: Kartir's inscription (Kartir KZ 1) on the Ka'ba-ye Zartosht ===
Transliteration	Transcription	Translation
W ANE kltyl ZY mgwpt yzd’n shpwhry MLKA’n MLKA hwplsťy W hwk’mky HWYTNn.	ud az Kirdīr ī mowbed, yazdān ud šābuhr šāhān šāh huparistāy ud hukāmag anēn.	And I, Kartir, the Magus priest, have been of good service and benevolent to the Gods and to Shapur, the King of Kings.
APm PWN ZK sp’sy ZYm PWN yzďn W Shpwhry MLKA’n MLKA krty HWYTNt	u-m pad ān spās ī-m pad yazdān ud šābuhr šāhān šāh kard anād	And for that service that I had done to the Gods and to Shapur, the King of Kings
ZKm OBYDWN šhpwhry MLKA’n MLKA PWN kltk’n ZY yzďn	ān-im kunēd šābuhr šāhān šāh pad kardagān ī yazdān,	Shapur, the King of Kings, makes me, when it comes to the divine matters,
PWN BBA W štry OL štry gyw’k OL gyw’k h’mštry PWN mgwstn k’mk’ly W p’thš’y	pad dar ud šahr ō šahr, gyāg ō gyāg hām-šahr pad mōwestān kāmgār ud pādixšāy.	at court and in kingdom after kingdom, place after place, in the whole empire, powerful and authoritative over the Magian estate.
W PWN plm’n ZY šhpwhry MLKA’n MLKA W pwšty ZY yzďn W MLKA’n MLKA	ud pad framān ī šābuhr šāhān šāh ud pušt ī yazdān ud šāhān šāh	And by order of Shapur, King of Kings, and with the support of the Gods and the King of Kings
štry OL štry gyw’k OL gyw’k KBYR krtk’n yzďn ’pz’dyhy W KBYR ’twry ZY wlhľn YTYBWNd	šahr ō šahr, gyāg ō gyāg was kardagān ī yazdān abzāyīh ud was ādur ī warharān nišānīh/nišinēnd	in kingdom after kingdom, place after place, many services to the Gods were increased and many Wahrām fires were instituted
W KBYR mgw GBRA ’wlw’hmy W ptyhwy YHWWNt	ud was moγ-mard urwāhm ud padēx būd	and many magi became joyful and prosperous
W KBD ’twr’n W mgwny p’thštly HTYMWNd	ud was ādurān ud magūn pādixšīr āwāšend/āwāšīh/āwišt	and many contracts for fires and magi were sealed.
W ’whrmzdy W yzďn LBA swty YHMTWN	ud ōhrmazd ud yazdān wuzurg sūd rasīd,	And great benefit came to Ahura Mazda and the Gods,
’hlmny W ŠDYA’n LBA mhyk’ly YHWWNt.	ud ahrēman ud dēwān wuzurg mihkār būd.	and there was great damage to Ahriman and the demons.

=== A sample of Manichaean Middle Persian: excerpt from the Shābuhragān ===
Transliteration	Transcription	Translation
՚wrwr, ՙsprhm, ՚wd mrw, wd ՚՚cyhr, ՚wd gwng-gwng ՚rwy kyšt ՚wd rwst.	urwar, isprahm, ud marw, ud *āzihr, ud gōnag-gōnag arōy kišt ud rust.	plants, flowers and herbs and seedless plants (?) and various growing things were sown and grew.
՚wš՚n xwd ՚՚z xwyš gryw ՚ndr ՚myxt.	u-šān xwad āz xwēš grīw andar āmixt.	And (the demon) Âz herself mixed her own self into them.
՚wd h՚n yk bhr ՙy ՚w dry՚b ՚wbyst, h՚nyš mzn ՙyw dwšcyhr ՚pr ՚wd shmyyn ՚cyš bwd.	ud ān yak bahr ī ō daryāb ōbist, hān-iš mazan ēw duščihr appar ud sahmēn aziš būd.	And that one part that fell into the sea—an ugly, predatory, and horrifying monster arose from it...
ps myhryzd, ՚c h՚n pnz yzd ՙy xwd ՚pwr	pas mihryazd, az hān panz yazd ī xwad āfur	Then the god Mihr, from among those five gods of his own creation,
h՚n yzd ՙyw ṯskyrb pryst՚d	hān yazd ēw taskirb frēstād	sent that four-shaped one,
ky ՚wy mzn ՚ndr ՚brg p՚dgws, ՚c xwr՚s՚n d՚ ՚w xwrnw՚r, pd hm՚g ՚brg pr՚r՚st	kē awē (= ōy) mazan andar abarag pādgōs, az xwarāsān dā ō xwarniwār, pad hamāg abarag frārāst	who stretched out that monster in the northern region, from east to west, in the entire north,
p՚y ՙspwxt ՚wd ՚bgnd, ՚wš ՚br ՙyst՚d, kw ՚ndr šhr wyn՚ẖ ny qwn՚d.	pāy ispōxt ud abgand, ō-š abar ēstād, ku andar šahr wināh nē kunād.	stamped his foot (on it), and hurled (it down), and stood on it, so that it could do no harm in the Realm (=world).
՚wd ՚wy yzd ՚br hm՚g zmyg ՚wd ՚sm՚n h՚mqyšwr, ՚br ՚brg ՚wd xwr՚s՚n, ՚yrg ՚wd xwrpr՚n ...	ud awē (= ōy) yazd abar hamāg zamīg ud āsmān hāmkišwar, abar abarag ud xwarāsān, ērag ud xwarparān ...	Over the entire earth, the sky, the universe, [over] north and east, south and west, that god ...
wysbyd qyrd kw šhr p՚y՚d.	wisbed kird ku šahr pāyād.	was made village-master so that that he should protect the Realm (world).

=== A sample of Psalter Pahlavi Middle Persian: Psalm 130 ===
Transliteration	Transcription	Translation
MNm (z)[pl](ʾ)dy KLYTNt HWEW MRWHY yzdty ZY LˊY	az-im zofrāy xwand, ay xwadāy yazd ī man.	Out of the depths have I cried, o Lord, my God.
APmyt OŠMENt wʾngy, l7 ʾywt nydwhšyˊt gwšy wʾngy ZYm l8 swtyklyhy.	u-m-it ašnūd wāng, ēw-t niyōxšēd gōš wāng ī-m sūdgarīh.	And my voice (be) heard by you, may your ear hear the voice of my prayer.
HT sydʾ NTLWNydy MRWHYʺ MNW twbʾn YKOYMWNt	agar syā(?) pāyē, xwadāy, kē tuwān estād?	If you watch for sinners, Lord, who can stand?
M)E MN LK ʾwlwny A(Y)TY hylšn[y] ptsʾš tlsy	čē az tō ōrōn ast hilišn padisā-š tars	But from you there is pardon, for the sake of fear of him.
pndy NTLWNt HYA ZY LY OL MRWHY; W pndy NTLWNt HYA ZY LY OLš MRYA	pand pād gyān ī man ō xwadāy; ud pand pād gyān ī man ō-š saxwan.	My soul attends to the advice of the Lord, and my soul attends to the advice of his word.
pndm NTLWNt ʿL MRWHY MN pʾsy ZY špk[y WOD O]L pʾsy ZY špky.	pand-am pād ō xwadāy az pās ī šabag tā ō pās ī šabag.	It attends to the advice of the Lord from one morning watch to another morning watch.
pndy N[TLW]Nt ʾdyly ʿL MRWHY MEš ʾcšy ʾwlwny HWEnd LHMYdy. APš KBYR ʾYTY LWTE pwlknʾ.	pand pād ēl ō xwadāy čē-š aziš ōrōn hēnd abaxšāyīh. U-š was ast abāg purkānā,	Israel shall attend to the advice of the Lord: for from him there is mercy for us. And with him there is great redemption.
W BNPŠE bwcʾt OL ʾdyly MNš hʾmd(wy)n dlwby	ud xwad bōzēd ō ēl aziš hāmēwēn drō.	And he himself shall save Israel from all of its Lies.

=== A sample of Book Pahlavi Middle Persian (historical narrative): Beginning of The Book of Ardā Wirāz ===
Transliteration	Transcription	Translation
PWN ŠM Y yzd’n	pad nām ī yazdān	In the name of the Gods:
’ytwn' YMRRWNd AYK ’yw b’l ’hlwb' zltwhšt ...	ēdōn gōwēnd kū ēw-bār ahlaw zardušt ...	Thus they have said that once the righteous Zoroaster ...
dyn' Y MKBLWNt BYN gyh’n lwb’k BRA krt	dēn ī padīrift andar gēhān rawāg be kard.	propagated in the world the religion that he had received.
W OD bwndkyh 300 ŠNT dyn' BYN ’p̄yckyh W ANŠWTA BYN ’pygwm’nyh YHWWNt HWHd	ud tā bawandagīh [ī] sē sad sāl dēn andar abēzagīh ud mardōm andar abē-gumānīh būd hēnd	And within a period of 300 years (the) religion remained in purity and the people were without any doubt.
W AHL gcstk' gn’k mynwg dlwnd ...	ud pas gizistag gannāg mēnōg [ī] druwand ...	And then, the accursed, foul and deceitful spirit ...
gwm’n' krtn' Y ANŠWTA’n' PWN ZNE dyn' l’d	gumān kardan ī mardōmān pad ēn dēn rāy,	in order to cause people to doubt this religion,
ZK gcstk ’lkskdl Y hlwm’dyk Y mwcl’dyk m’nšn' wyd’p’nynyt	ān gizistag *alek/sandar ī *hrōmāyīg ī muzrāyīg-mānišn wiyābānēnīd	led astray that Alexander the Roman, resident of Egypt,
Y PWN gl’n szd W nplt' W dhyyk OL ’yl’nštr' YATWNt ...	ī pad garān sezd ud *nibard ud *wišēg ō ērān-šahr āmad ...	who came to Iran with grave tyranny and violence and distress ...
APš OLE ’уl’n dhywpt YKTLWNt W BBA W hwťyh wšwpt W ’pyl’n krt	u-š ōy ērān dahibed ōzad ud dar ud xwadāyīh wišuft ud awērān kard.	and murdered the ruler of Iran and ruined the court and the lordship and made them desolate.
W ZNE dyn' cygwn hm’k ’pst’k W znd QDM TWRA pwstyh’ Y wyl’stk' PWN MYA Y ZHBA npštk	ud ēn dēn čiyōn hamāg abestāg ud zand [ī] abar gāw pōstīhā ī wirāstag pad āb ī zarr nibištag	and the (scriptures of the) religion, as all the Avesta and Zand, which were written on ox-hides decorated with water-of-gold (gold leaves)
BYN sťhl p’pk’n' PWN KLYTA npšt HNHTWNt YKOYMWN’t'	andar staxr [ī] pābagān pad diz [ī] *nibišt nihād ēstād –	and had been placed in Stakhr of Papak in the 'citadel of the writings' –
OLE ptyďlk Y SLYA bht Y ’hlmwk Y dlwnd Y ’n’k krťl ’lkskdl hlwm’dyk	ōy petyārag ī wad-baxt ī ahlomōγ ī druwand ī anāg-kardār *aleksandar [ī] hrōmāyīg	that evil, ill-fated, heretical, false, maleficent Alexander, the Roman,
mwcl’dyk m’nšn' QDM YHYTYWNt W BRA swht	[ī] muzrāyīg-mānišn abar āwurd ud be sōxt.	who was dwelling in Egypt, stole them and burned them up.

=== A sample of Book Pahlavi Middle Persian (legendary narrative): an excerpt from the Lesser Bundahišn ===
Transliteration	Transcription	Translation
s’m l’d YMRRWNyt AYK ’hwš YHWWNyt'.	sām rāy gōwēd kū ahōš būd.	Concerning Sam, it (the religious tradition) says that he was immortal.
PWN ZK AMTš tlmynyt' dyn' Y m’zdsn’n'	pad ān ka-š tar-menīd dēn ī māzdēsnān,	At the time when he scorned the Mazdayasnian religion,
twlk-1 Y nwhyn' KLYTWNynd' AMT' HLMWNt' YKOYMWN’t', PWN tgl BRA wn’syt TME PWN dšt' Y pyš’nsyd	turk-ē ī nōhīn xwānēnd, ka xuft ēstād, pad tigr be wināhīd, ānōh pad dašt ī pēšānsē;	a Turk whom they call Nohīn wounded him with an arrow, when he was asleep there, in the plain of Pēšānsē;
APš ZK y ’p’lwn' bwš’sp QDM YBLWNt' YKOYMWN’t.	u-š ān ī abārōn Būšāsp abar burd ēstād.	and it had brought upon him sinful Lethargy (Būšāsp).
mdy’n' Y dlmk' ŠKBHWNt	mayān ī darmag {*dramanag} nibast	In the midst of the wormwood bush he lay
APš wpl ’cpl nšst YKOYMWNyt'	u-š wafr azabar nišast ēstēd,	and snow has settled on him,
PWN ZK k’l AYK AMT' ’<u>c</u>ydh’k hl<u>c</u>k' bwyt	pad ān kār kū ka azdahāg harzag bawēd,	so that when Azdahāg is freed,
OLE ’h(y)cyt' APš YKTLWNyt'	ōy āxēzēd u-š ōzanēd	he may arise and slay him;
APš bywl plw’hl ’hlwb’n' p’nk' HWEynd.	u-š bēwar frawahr ī ahlawān pānag hēnd.	and a myriad guardian spirits of the righteous protect him.
dh’k MNW bywlspc KRYTWNd l’d YMRRWNyt'	dahāg kē bēwarasp-iz xwānēnd rāy, gōwēd	Of Dahāg, whom they also call Bēwarāsp, it says this:
AYK plytwn' AMTš OHDWNt' PWN kwštn' LA š’yst',	kū frēdōn ka-š dahāg be grift pad kuštan nē šāyist,	that when Frēdōn captured him, it was not possible to kill him,
APš AHL PWN kwp y dwmbwnd BRA bst'	u-š pas pad kōf ī dumbāwand be bast.	and he afterwards bound him to Mount Dumbāwand.
AMT' hlck' YHWWNyt' s’m ’hycyt' APš gd znyt' W YKTLWYNyt'	ka harzag bawēd sām axēzēd u-š gad zanēd ud ōzanēd.	When he is freed, Sām will rise up and strike him with his mace and kill him.

=== Sample of Book Pahlavi Middle Persian (theological discourse): excerpt from the Lesser Bundahišn 2 ===
Transliteration	Transcription	Translation
KRA 2 mynwd knʾlkʾwmnd W ʾknʾlkʾwmnd.	har dō mēnōg kanāragōmand ud a-kanāragōmand.	Both spirits (Ohrmazd and Ahriman) are limited and unlimited.
bʾɫyst ZK Y ʾsl lwšnyh YMRRWNd W zwpʾy ZK ʾsl tʾlyk	bālist ān ī a-sar-rōšnīh gōwēnd ud zofāy ān a-sar-tārīg.	(For) the supreme is that which they call endless light, and the abyss that which is endlessly dark,
AYKšʾn mdyʾn twhyk W ʾywk LWTE TWB LA ptwst YKWYMWNyt.	kū-šān mayān tuhīg ud ēk abāg did nē paywast ēstēd.	so that between them is a void, and one has not been connected with the other;
W TWB KRA 2 mynwd PWN NPŠE tn' knʾlkʾwmnd HWEd.	ud did har dō mēnōg pad xwēš-tan kanāragōmand hēnd.	and, again, both spirits are limited as to their own bodies.
W TWB hlwsp ʾkʾsyh (Y) whrmzd lʾd	ud did harwisp-āgāhīh (ī) ohrmazd rāy,	And, further, on account of the omniscience of Ohrmazd,
KRA 2 MNDOM BYN dʾnšn Y whrmzd, knʾlkʾwmnd W ʾknʾlkʾwmnd	har dō čiš andar dānišn ī ohrmazd, kanāragōmand ud akanāragōmand;	both things are within the knowledge of Ohrmazd, finite and infinite;
MNW ZNE ZK Y BYN KRA 2ʾn mynwd ptmʾn YDOYTWNnd	čē ān ī andar har dōwān mēnōg paymān dānēnd.	for that which is in the covenant of both spirits, they (both) know.
W TWB bwndk pʾthšʾdyh dʾm Y ʾwhrmzd PWN tn' (Y) psyn YHWWNyt'	ud did bowandag pādixšāyīh ī dām ī ohrmazd pad tan <ī> pasēn bawēd,	And, further, the perfect dominion of the creation of Ohrmazd shall be in the Ultimate Incarnation,
ZKyc AYT [Y] OD hmʾk hmʾk lwbšnyh ʾknʾlkʾwmnd	ān-iz ast tā hamē-hamē-rawišnīh a-kanāragōmand.	and that also is unlimited for ever and everlasting.
W dʾm Y ʾhlmn PWN ZK zmʾn BRA ʾp̄sy[n](h)yt, MNW tn' (Y) psyn YHWWNyt. ZKyc AYT ʾknʾlkyh	ud dām ī ahreman pad ān zamān be abesīhēd, ka tan (ī) pasēn bawēd. ān-iz ast akanāragīh.	And the creation of Ahriman will be destroyed at the time when the Ultimate Incarnation occurs, and that also is eternity.

=== Poetry ===
A sample Middle Persian poem from manuscript of Jamasp Asana:

Original in Middle Persian: Dārom andarz-ē az dānāgān Az guft-ī pēšēnīgān Ō šmāh bē wizārom Pad rāstīh andar gēhān Agar ēn az man padīrēd Bavēd sūd-ī dō gēhān	Near literal translation into Modern Persian: Dāram andarz-i az dānāyān دارم اندرزی از دانایان Az gofte-ye pišiniyān از گفتهٔ پیشینیان Be šomā be-gozāram به شما بگزارم Be rāstī andar jahān به راستی اندر جهان Agar īn az man pazīrid اگر این از من پذیرید Bovad sūd-e dō jahān بوَد سود دو جهان	Translation into English: I have a counsel from the wise, from the advises of the ancients, I will pass it upon you By truth in the world If you accept this counsel It will be your benefits for this life and the next

== Vocabulary ==
=== Affixes ===
There are a number of affixes in Middle Persian:

Middle Persian	English	Other Indo-European	Example(s)
A-	Privative prefix, un-, non-, not-	Greek a- (e.g. atom)	a-spās 'ungrateful', a-bim 'fearless', a-čār 'inevitable', a-dād 'unjust'
An-	Prevocalic privative prefix, un-, non-	English -un, German ant-	an-ērān 'non-Iranian', an-ast 'non-existent'
-ik (-ig in Late Middle Persian)	Having to do with, having the nature of, made of, caused by, similar to	English -ic, Latin -icus, Greek –ikos, Slavic -ьkъ/-ьcь	Pārsīk 'Persian', Āsōrik 'Assyrian', Pahlavik 'Parthian', Hrōmāyīk/Hrōmīk 'Byzantine, Roman'

=== Location suffixes ===
Middle Persian	Other Indo-European	Example(s)
-gerd	Slavic gorod/grad	Mithradatgerd "Mithridates City", Susangerd (City of Susan), Darabgerd "Darius City", Bahramjerd "Bahram City", Dastgerd, Virugerd, Borujerd
-vīl		Ardabil "Holy City", Kabul and Zabol
-āpāt (later -ābād)		Ashkābād > Ashgabat "Land of Arsaces"
-stān	English stead 'town', Russian stan 'settlement', common root with Germanic stand	Tapurstan, Sakastan

=== Comparison of Middle Persian and Modern Persian vocabulary ===
There are some phonological differences between Middle Persian and New Persian. Initial consonant clusters were very common in Middle Persian (e.g. سپاس spās "thanks"). However, New Persian does not allow initial consonant clusters, whereas final consonant clusters are common (e.g. اسب asb "horse").

Early Middle Persian	English	Early New Persian	Notes	Indo-European derived/ borrowed words from Middle Persian
Ambar ('mbl, 'nbl)	Amber, Ambergris	–	Borrowed in Arabic as: ʿanbar عَنْبَر	
Arjat	Silver	sīm (سیم)		Latin: argentum (French: argent), Armenian: arsat, Old Irish: airget, PIE: h₂erǵn̥t-, an n-stem
Arž	Silver coinage	Arj (ارج) 'value/worth'	Same as Arg (АргЪ) 'price' in Ossetian	
Asēm 𐭠𐭮𐭩𐭬	Iron	Āhan (آهن)	German Eisen	
Az 𐭬𐭭	From	Az (از),		
Brād, Brādar 𐭡𐭥𐭠𐭣𐭥	Brother	Barādar (برادر)		Old Ch. Slavonic brat(r)u, Lithuanian brolis, Latin: frāter, Old Irish brathair, O. H. German bruoder
Duxtar 𐭣𐭥𐭧𐭲𐭫	Daughter	Duxtar (دختر)	Gothic dauhtar, O. H. German tochter, Old Prussian duckti, Armenian dowstr, Lithuanian dukte	
Drōd 𐭣𐭫𐭥𐭣	Hello (lit. 'health')	Durōd (درود)		Russian здорово
Ēvārak	Evening	Extinct in Modern Persian	Luri ēvār (ایوار)	
Fradāk	Tomorrow	Fardā (فردا)	Fra- 'towards'	Greek pro-, Lithuanian pra, etc.
Fradom	First	Fardum (فردم)	Pronin in Sangsari language	First, primary, Latin: primus, Greek πρίν, Sanskrit प्रथम prathama
Hāmīn 𐭧𐭠𐭬𐭩𐭭	Summer	-	Hāmīn exists in Balochi.	
Mātar 𐭬𐭠𐭲𐭥	Mother	Mādar (مادر)		Latin: māter, Old Church Slavonic mater, Lithuanian motina
Murd 𐭬𐭥𐭫𐭣	Died	Murd (مرد)		Latin: morta, English murd-er, Old Russian mirtvu, Lithuanian mirtis
Nē 𐭫𐭠	No	Na (نه)		
Ōhāy 𐭠𐭧𐭠𐭩	Yes	ārē (آری)		
Pad 𐭯𐭥𐭭	To, at, in, on	Ba (به)		
Pad-drōt 𐭯𐭥𐭭 𐭣𐭫𐭥𐭣	Goodbye	Ba durōd (به درود), later badrōd (بدرود)		
Pidar 𐭯𐭣𐭫	Father	Pidar (پدر)		Latin: pater (Italian padre), Old High German fater
Rōz 𐭩𐭥𐭬	Day	Rōz (روز)	From rōšn 'light'. rōč (رُوچ) in Balochi	Armenian lois 'light', Latin: lux 'light', Spanish luz 'light'
Šagr𐭱𐭢𐭫, Šēr^{1}	Lion	Šēr (شیر)	From Old Persian *šagra-. Tajiki Persian шер šer	
Sāl 𐭱𐭭𐭲	Year	Sāl (سال)		Armenian sārd 'sun', German Sonne, Russian солнце
Šīr𐭱𐭩𐭫 ^{1}	Milk	Šīr (شیر)	From Old Persian **xšīra-. Tajiki шир šir	from PIE: *swēyd-
Spās 𐭮𐭯𐭠𐭮	Thanks	Sipās (سپاس)	PIE: *speḱ-	
Stārag 𐭮𐭲𐭠𐭫𐭪, Star 𐭮𐭲𐭫	Star	Sitāra (ستاره)	Latin: stella, Old English: steorra, Gothic: stairno, Old Norse: stjarna	
Tābestān 𐭲𐭠𐭯𐭮𐭲𐭠𐭭	(adjective for) summer	Tābistān (تابستان)		
Xwāh(ar) 𐭧𐭥𐭠𐭧	Sister	Xwāhar (خواهر)		Armenian: khoyr

^{1} Since some vowels of Middle Persian did not continue in Modern Persian, a number of homophones were created in New Persian. For example, šir and šer, meaning "milk" and "lion", respectively, are now both pronounced šir. In this case, the older pronunciation is maintained in Dari and Tajiki Persian.

=== Middle Persian cognates in other languages ===
There is a number of Persian loanwords in English, many of which can be traced to Middle Persian. The lexicon of Classical Arabic also contains many borrowings from Middle Persian. In such borrowings Iranian consonants that sound foreign to Arabic, g, č, p, and ž, have been replaced by q/k, j, š, f/b, and s/z. The exact Arabic renderings of the suffixes -ik/-ig and -ak/-ag is often used to deduce the different periods of borrowing. The following is a parallel word list of cognates:

Middle Persian	English	Other Languages	Possible Arabic Borrowing	English
Srat	Street	Latin strata 'street', Welsh srat 'plain'; from PIE root stere- 'to spread, extend, stretch out' (Avestan star-, Latin sternere, Old Church Slavonic stira)	Sirāt (صراط)	Path
Burg	Tower	Germanic burg 'castle' or 'fort'	Burj (برج)	Tower
Tāk	Arch, vault, window	Borrowed into Anatolian Turkish and Standard Azerbaijani in taqča 'a little window, a niche'	Tāq (طاق)	Arch
Nav-xudā	Master of a ship, captain	From PIE root *nau-; cognates with Latin navigia. Borrowed into Indonesian nakhoda	Nāxu𝛿ā (نوخذة)	Captain
Nargis	Narcissus		Narjis (نرجس)	Narcissus
Gōš	Hearer, listener, ear	Of the same root is Aramaic gūšak 'prognosticator, informer' (From Middle Persian gōšak with -ak as a suffix of nomen agentis)	Jāsūs (جاسوس)	Spy
A-sar; A- (negation prefix) + sar (end, beginning)	Infinite, endless	A- prefix in Greek; Sanskrit siras, Hittite harsar 'head'	Azal (أزل)	Infinite
A-pad; a- (prefix of negation) + pad (end)	Infinity		Abad (أبد)	Infinity, forever
Dēn	Religion	From Avestan daena	Dīn (دين)	Religion
Bōstān (bō 'aroma, scent' + -stan place-name element)	Garden		Bustān (بستان)	Garden
Čirāg	Lamp		Sirāj (سراج)	Lamp
Tāg	Crown, tiara		Tāj (تاج)	Crown
Pargār	Compass		Firjār (فرجار)	Compass (drawing tool)
Ravāg	Current		Rawāj (رواج)	Popularity
Ravāk (older form of ravāg; from the root rav (v. raftan) 'to go')	Current		Riwāq (رواق)	Place of passage, corridor
Gund	Army, troop		Jund (جند)	Army
Šalwār	Trousers		Sirwāl (سروال)	Trousers
Rōstāk	Village, district, province		Ruzdāq (رزداق)	Village
Zar-parān	Saffron		Zaʿfarān (زعفران)	Saffron
Sādag	Simple		Sa𝛿ij (ساذج)	Simple
Banafšag	Violet		Banafsaj (بنفسج)	Violet
Pahrist	List, register, index		Fihris (فهرس)	List, index
Tašt	Basin, washtub		Tašt (طشت)	Basin, washtub
Dāyak	Nurse, midwife		Daya (داية)	Midwife
Xandak	Ditch, trench		Xandaq (خندق)	Ditch, trench

=== Comparison of Middle Persian and Modern Persian names ===
Middle Persian	New Persian	Old Persian	English
Anāhid	Nāhid	Anāhitā	Anahita
Artaxšēr	Ardašir	Artaxšaça	Artaxerxes
Mihr	Mehr	Miça	Mithra
Rokhsāna	Roksāne		Roxana
Pāpak	Bābak		Pabag
Āleksandar, Sukandar	Eskandar		Alexander
Pērōz, Pērōč	Pīruz		Feroze
Mihrdāt	Mehrdād	Miθradāta	Mithridates
Borān	Borān		Borān
Husraw, Xusraw	Khosrow		Chosroes
Zaratu(x)št	Zartōšt		Zoroaster
Ōhrmazd	Hormizd	A(h)uramazdā	Ahura Mazda, astr. Jupiter

== See also ==
- Avestan
- Old Persian
- New Persian
- Parthian language
- Persian language
- Persian language#History
- Middle Persian literature
- Nikabad
- Bandari
- Achomi
