= Bardsir Refugee Camp =

Refugee camp in Kerman province, Iran

Bardsir Refugee Camp Persian: اردوگاه افاغنه
- Refugee Camp
- Country: Iran
- Province: Kerman
- County: Bardsir
- District: Negar
- Rural District: Narp

Population (2016)
  - Total: 3,504
- Time zone: UTC+3:30 (IRST)

Bardsir Refugee Camp (Persian: اردوگاه افاغنه, romanized: Orgodah Afagheneh) (Note: Romanized as Ardūgāh Afāghaneh) is a refugee camp in Narp Rural District of Negar District, Bardsir County, Kerman province, Iran.

== Demographics ==
=== Population ===
At the time of the 2006 National Census, the village's population was 7,679 in 1,545 households, when it was in Mashiz Rural District of the Central District. The following census in 2011 counted 3,912 people in 863 households, by which time the Afghan Refugee Camp had been separated from the district in the establishment of Negar District. It was transferred to Narp Rural District, created in the new district. The 2016 census measured the population of the village as 3,504 people in 823 households. It was the most populous locality in its rural district.

In 2009 a number of refugees were repatriated from the camp, most of them Kochis who fled the Soviet occupation of Afghanistan.

In 2013 the Norwegian Refugee Council started a program to improve the shelters in the camp.

In 2023 the camp had a population of over 5500 Afghan refugees.
