= Mahtu =

Mahtu ماه تو
- Village
- Location within Iran
- Coordinates: 29°53′00″N 57°00′00″E
- Country: Iran
- Province: Kerman
- County: Bardsir
- Bakhsh: Central
- Rural District: Negar

Population (2006)
  - Total: 58
- Time zone: UTC+3:30 (IRST)
  - Summer (DST): UTC+4:30 (IRDT)

Mahtu (Persian: ماه تو, also Romanized as Māhtū) is a village in Negar Rural District, in the Central District of Bardsir County, Kerman Province, Iran. At the 2006 census, its population was 58, in 14 families.
