= Ghobeyra =

Ghobeyra غبيرا
- Village
- Location within Iran
- Coordinates: 29°50′45″N 56°57′28″E
- Country: Iran
- Province: Kerman
- County: Bardsir
- Bakhsh: Central
- Rural District: Negar

Population (2006)
  - Total: 335
- Time zone: UTC+3:30 (IRST)
  - Summer (DST): UTC+4:30 (IRDT)

Ghobeyra (Persian: غبيرا, also Romanized as Ghobeyrā and Ghobīrā’; also known as Ghoveyrā, Ghubera, Qabīrā, and Qobeyrā) is a village in Negar Rural District, in the Central District of Bardsir County, Kerman Province, Iran. At the 2006 census, its population was 335, in 69 families.
