= Narp, Iran =

Village in Kerman province, Iran

Narp Persian: نارپ
- Village
- Location within Iran
- Coordinates: 29°45′25″N 56°40′28″E
- Country: Iran
- Province: Kerman
- County: Bardsir
- District: Negar
- Rural District: Narp

Population (2016)
  - Total: 768
- Time zone: UTC+3:30 (IRST)

Narp (Persian: نارپ) (Note: Also romanized as Nārp; also known as Nārb and Qal‘eh Nārp) is a village in, and the capital of, Narp Rural District of Negar District, Bardsir County, Kerman province, Iran.

== Demographics ==
=== Population ===
At the time of the 2006 National Census, the village's population was 653 in 138 households, when it was in Mashiz Rural District of the Central District. The following census in 2011 counted 626 people in 154 households, by which time the village had been separated from the district in the formation of Negar District. Narp was transferred to Narp Rural District created in the district. The 2016 census measured the population of the village as 768 people in 227 households.
