= Bahramjerd =

Village in Kerman province, Iran

Bahramjerd Persian: بهرام جرد
- Village
- Location within Iran
- Coordinates: 29°52′38″N 56°57′30″E
- Country: Iran
- Province: Kerman
- County: Bardsir
- District: Negar
- Rural District: Negar

Population (2016)
  - Total: 493
- Time zone: UTC+3:30 (IRST)

Bahramjerd (Persian: بهرام جرد) (Note: Also romanized as Bahrāmjerd; also known as Bahrāmjird) is a village in Negar Rural District of Negar District, Bardsir County, Kerman province, Iran.

== Demographics ==
=== Population ===
At the time of the 2006 National Census, the village's population was 219 in 70 households, when it was in the Central District of Bardsir County. The following census in 2011 counted 272 people in 83 households, by which time the rural district had been separated from the district in the formation of Negar District. The 2016 census measured the population of the village as 493 people in 151 households. It was the most populous village in its rural district.
