= Negar =

City in Kerman province, Iran

Negar Persian: نگار
- City
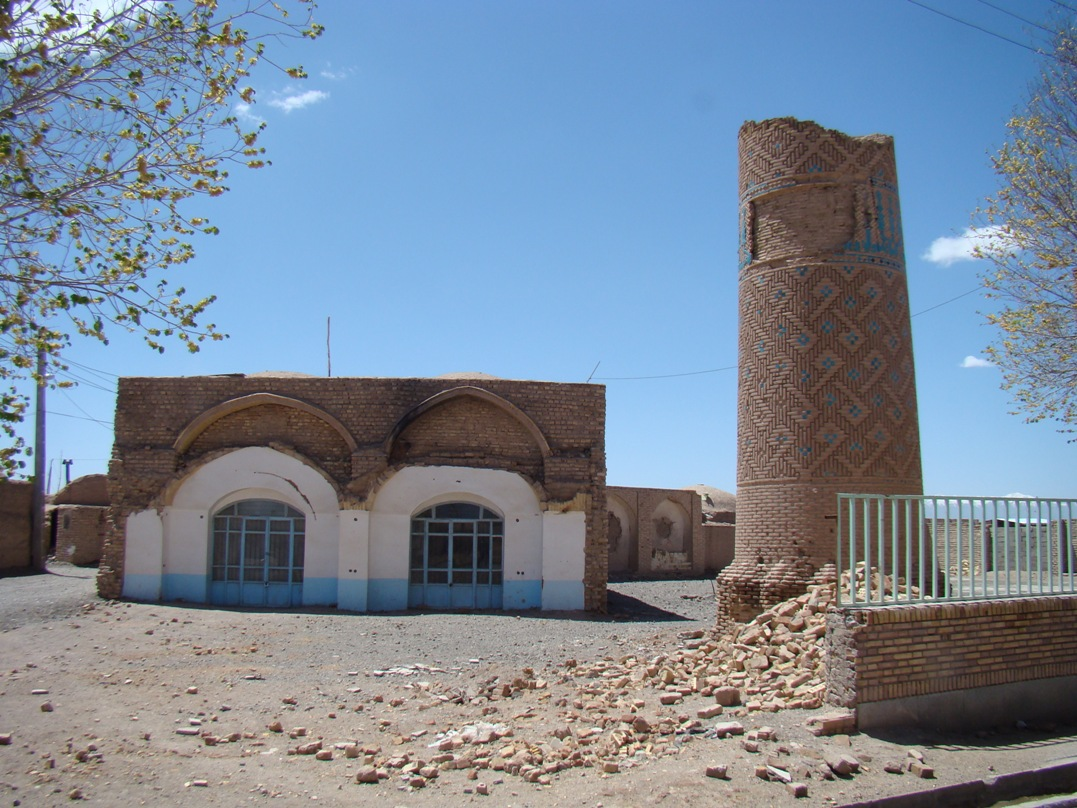
- Jameh Mosque of Negar

- Location within Iran
- Coordinates: 29°51′25″N 56°48′03″E
- Country: Iran
- Province: Kerman
- County: Bardsir
- District: Negar

Population (2016)
  - Total: 7,600
- Time zone: UTC+3:30 (IRST)

Negar (Persian: نگار) (Note: Also romanized as Negār; also known as Nīgār and Qanāt Bāgh) is a city in, and the capital of, Negar District of Bardsir County, Kerman province, Iran. It also serves as the administrative center for Negar Rural District.

== Demographics ==
=== Population ===
At the time of the 2006 National Census, the city's population was 9,291 in 1,583 households, when it was in the Central District. The following census in 2011 counted 5,731 people in 1,503 households, by which time the rural district had been separated from the district in the formation of Negar District. The 2016 census measured the population of Negar as 7,600 people in 2,441 households, when the city had been transferred to the district.
