= Negar District =

District in Kerman province, Iran

Negar District Persian: بخش نگار
- District
- Location within Iran
- Coordinates: 29°51′48″N 56°50′32″E
- Country: Iran
- Province: Kerman
- County: Bardsir
- Capital: Negar

Population (2016)
  - Total: 17,171
- Time zone: UTC+3:30 (IRST)

Negar District (Persian: بخش نگار) is in Bardsir County, Kerman province, Iran. Its capital is the city of Negar.

== History ==
After the 2006 National Census, Negar Rural District, and later the city of Negar, were separated from the Central District in the establishment of Negar District, which was divided into two rural districts, including the new Narp Rural District.

== Demographics ==
=== Population ===
At the time of the 2011 census, the district's population was 8,509 in 2,112 households. The 2016 census measured the population of the district as 17,171 inhabitants in 5,122 households.

=== Administrative divisions ===
Negar District Population
Administrative Divisions	2011	2016
Narp RD	6,100	6,112
Negar RD	2,409	3,459
Negar (city)		7,600
Total	8,509	17,171
RD = Rural District
