= Negar Rural District =

Rural district in Kerman province, Iran

Negar Rural District Persian: دهستان نگار
- Rural District
- Location within Iran
- Coordinates: 29°53′09″N 56°53′57″E
- Country: Iran
- Province: Kerman
- County: Bardsir
- District: Negar
- Capital: Negar

Population (2016)
  - Total: 3,459
- Time zone: UTC+3:30 (IRST)

Negar Rural District (Persian: دهستان نگار) is in Negar District of Bardsir County, Kerman province, Iran. It is administered from the city of Negar.

== Demographics ==
=== Population ===
At the time of the 2006 National Census, the rural district's population (as a part of the Central District of Bardsir County) was 2,807 in 679 households. There were 2,409 inhabitants in 644 households at the following census of 2011, by which time the rural district had been separated from the district in the formation of Negar District. The 2016 census measured the population of the rural district as 3,459 in 1,042 households. The most populous of its 123 villages was Bahramjerd, with 493 people.
