= Abdolabad =

Abdolabad or Abdol Abad (Persian: عبدل‌آباد) may refer to:

== Alborz Province ==
- Abdolabad, Alborz, a village in Nazarabad County

== East Azerbaijan Province ==
- Abdolabad, East Azerbaijan, a village in Malekan County
- Abdolabad, Sarab, a village in Sarab County

== Fars Province ==
- Abdolabad, Arsanjan, a village in Arsanjan County
- Abdolabad, Sepidan, a village in Sepidan County

== Hamadan Province ==
- Abdolabad, Hamadan, a village in Kabudarahang County

== Isfahan Province ==
- Abdolabad, Isfahan, a village in Buin va Miandasht County

== Kerman Province ==
- Abdolabad, Bardsir, a village in Bardsir County
- Abdolabad, Lalehzar, a village in Bardsir County
- Abdolabad, Jiroft, a village in Jiroft County
- Abdolabad, Kerman, a village in Kerman County
- Abdolabad, Narmashir, a village in Narmashir County
- Abdolabad, Rafsanjan, a village in Rafsanjan County
- Abdolabad, Rudbar-e Jonubi, a village in Rudbar-e Jonubi County
- Abdolabad, Shahr-e Babak, a village in Shahr-e Babak County
- Abdolabad, Zarand, a village in Zarand County
- Abdolabad, Vahdat, a village in Zarand County

== Kurdistan Province ==
- Abdolabad, Kurdistan, a village in Qorveh County

== Lorestan Province ==
- Abdolabad, Selseleh, a village in Selseleh County
- Abdolabad-e Kani Kabud, a village in Delfan County

== North Khorasan Province ==
- Abdolabad, alternate name of Abdollahabad, Garmkhan, a village in Bojnord County

== Qazvin Province ==
- Abdolabad, Abyek, a village in Abyek County
- Abdolabad, Qazvin, a village in Qazvin County

== Qom ==
- Abdolabad-e Pain, in Qom County

== Razavi Khorasan Province ==
- Abdolabad, Bardaskan, a village in Bardaskan County
- Abdolabad, Firuzeh, a village in Firuzeh County
- Abdolabad, Joghatai, a village in Joghatai County
- Abdolabad, Khoshab, a village in Khoshab County
- Abdolabad, Mahvelat, a village in Mahvelat County
- Abdolabad, Mashhad, a village in Mashhad County
- Abdolabad, Nishapur, a village in Nishapur County
- Abdol Abad, Torbat-e Heydarieh, a village in Torbat-e Heydarieh County
- Abdolabad, Torbat-e Jam, a village in Torbat-e Jam County

== Semnan Province ==
- Abdolabad, Semnan, in Damghan County
- Abdolabad, Amirabad, in Damghan County

== Tehran Province ==
- Abdolabad, Tehran, a village in Pakdasht County
- Abdolabad-e Gardaneh, a village in Rey County

== West Azerbaijan Province ==
- Abdolabad, Maku, a village in Maku County
- Abdolabad, West Azerbaijan, a village in Salmas County

== See also ==
- Abdalabad (disambiguation)
