= Abdollahabad =

Abdollahabad or Abbdollahabad (Persian: عبداللّه آباد) may refer to:

== East Azerbaijan Province ==
- Abdollahabad, East Azerbaijan, a village in Sarab County

== Fars Province ==
- Abdollahabad, Fars, a village in Arsanjan County

== Hamadan Province ==
- Abdollahabad, Hamadan, a village in Kabudarahang County

== Hormozgan Province ==
- Abdollahabad, Hormozgan, a village in Minab County

== Kerman Province ==
- Abdollahabad, Anbarabad, a village in Anbarabad County
- Abdollahabad, Bardsir, a village in Bardsir County
- Abdollahabad 1, a village in Bardsir County
- Abdollahabad 2, a village in Bardsir County
- Abdollahabad, Narmashir, a village in Narmashir County
- Abdollahabad, Rafsanjan, a village in Rafsanjan County
- Abdollahabad, Rudbar-e Jonubi, a village in Rudbar-e Jonubi County
- Abdollahabad, Shahr-e Babak, a village in Shahr-e Babak County
- Abdollahabad, Zarand, a village in Zarand County

== Mazandaran Province ==
- Abdollahabad, Mahmudabad, a village in Mahmudabad County
- Abdollahabad, Nur, a village in Nur County
- Abdollahabad, Tonekabon, a village in Tonekabon County

== North Khorasan Province ==
- Abdollahabad, Garmkhan, North Khorasan Province
- Abdollahabad, Raz and Jargalan, North Khorasan Province

== Qom Province ==
- Abdollahabad, Qom

== Razavi Khorasan Province ==
- Abdollahabad, Bardaskan, Razavi Khorasan Province
- Abdollahabad, Firuzeh, Razavi Khorasan Province
- Abdollahabad, Khoshab, Razavi Khorasan Province
- Abdollahabad, Mahvelat, Razavi Khorasan Province
- Abdollahabad, Mashhad, Razavi Khorasann Province
- Abdollahabad, Nishapur, Razavi Khorasann Province

== Semnan Province ==
- Abdollahabad, Damghan, in Damghan County
- Abdollahabad, Amirabad, in Damghan County
- Abdollahabad-e Bala, in Semnan County

== Tehran Province ==
- Abdollahabad, Tehran
- Abdollahabad-e Ojaq, Tehran Province

== West Azerbaijan Province ==
- Abdollahabad, Bukan, a village in Bukan County
- Abdollahabad, Mahabad, a village in Mahabad County

== Yazd Province ==
- Abdollahabad, Yazd, a village in Mehriz County
