= Javadiyeh (disambiguation) =

Javadiyeh is a neighborhood of Tehran.

Javadiyeh or Javadieh (Persian: جواديه) may refer to:

- Javadiyeh, Arsanjan, Fars Province
- Javadiyeh, Eqlid, Fars Province
- Javadieh, Shiraz, Fars Province
- Javadiyeh, Hamadan
- Javadiyeh ol Hiyeh, Kerman Province
- Javadiyeh-ye Mortazavi, Kerman Province
- Javadiyeh-ye Zeydabad, Kerman province
- Javadiyeh, Markazi
- Javadiyeh, Mashhad, Razavi Khorasan Province
- Javadiyeh, Nishapur, Razavi Khorasan Province
- Javadiyeh, Torbat-e Heydarieh, Razavi Khorasan Province
- Javadiyeh, South Khorasan
