= Safarabad =

Safarabad (Persian: صفراباد) may refer to:

- Safarabad, Ardabil
- Safarabad, Fars
- Safarabad, Kermanshah
- Safarabad, Kohgiluyeh and Boyer-Ahmad
- Safarabad, Aligudarz, Lorestan Province
- Safarabad, Khorramabad, Lorestan Province
- Safarabad, Kuhdasht, Lorestan Province
- Safarabad, Miandorud, Mazandaran Province
- Safarabad, Sari, Mazandaran Province
- Safarabad, Qom
