= Do Kuhak =

Do Kuhak or Dow Kuhak or Dokoohak or Dukuhak (Persian: دوكوهك) may refer to:

- Do Kuhak, Arsanjan, Fars Province
- Do Kuhak, Shiraz, Fars Province
- Do Kuhak, Kerman
- Do Kuhak, Khuzestan
- Do Kuhak, Kohgiluyeh and Boyer-Ahmad
