= Deh-e Bid =

Deh-e Bid or Deh Bid (Persian: ده بيد) may refer to:

- Deh Bid, alternate name of Safashahr, Fars Province
- Deh Bid, Arsanjan, Fars Province
- Dehbid, Marvdasht, Fars Province
- Deh Bid, Sepidan, Fars Province
- Deh Bid, Kohgiluyeh and Boyer-Ahmad
- Deh-e Bid Pichab, Kohgiluyeh and Boyer-Ahmad Province

== See also ==
- Dahbed, Uzbekistan
