= Emam Kandi =

Emam Kandi or Emamkandi (Persian: امام كندي) may refer to various places in Iran:

- Emam Kandi, Khoy, West Azerbaijan Province
- Emam Kandi, Anzal, Urmia County, West Azerbaijan Province
- Emam Kandi, Sumay-ye Beradust, Urmia County, West Azerbaijan Province
- Emam Kandi, Torkaman, Urmia County, West Azerbaijan Province
- Emam Kandi, Khodabandeh, Zanjan Province
- Emam Kandi, Mahneshan, Zanjan Province
