= Jafarabad, Arsanjan =

Village in Fars, Iran

Jafarabad جعفرآباد
- Village
- Location within Iran
- Coordinates: 29°45′27″N 53°14′16″E
- Country: Iran
- Province: Fars
- County: Arsanjan
- Bakhsh: Central
- Rural District: Khobriz

Population (2006)
  - Total: 204
- Time zone: UTC+3:30 (IRST)
  - Summer (DST): UTC+4:30 (IRDT)

Jafarabad (Persian: جعفرآباد, also Romanized as Ja‘farābād) is a village in Khobriz Rural District, in the Central District of Arsanjan County, Fars province, Iran. At the 2006 census, its population was 204, in 40 families.
