= Salehabad, Arsanjan =

Salehabad صالح اباد
- Village
- Location within Iran
- Coordinates: 29°47′47″N 53°16′51″E
- Country: Iran
- Province: Fars
- County: Arsanjan
- Bakhsh: Central
- Rural District: Aliabad-e Malek

Population (2006)
  - Total: 519
- Time zone: UTC+3:30 (IRST)
  - Summer (DST): UTC+4:30 (IRDT)

Salehabad (Persian: صالح اباد, also Romanized as Şāleḩābād and Salāhābād; also known as Şāleḩābād-e Bālā and Şāleḩābād-e Pā’īn) is a village in Aliabad-e Malek Rural District, in the Central District of Arsanjan County, Fars province, Iran. At the 2006 census, its population was 519, in 127 families.
