= Chasht Khor =

Chasht Khvor چاشت خور
- Village
- Location within Iran
- Coordinates: 29°43′44″N 53°13′02″E
- Country: Iran
- Province: Fars
- County: Arsanjan
- Bakhsh: Central
- Rural District: Shurab

Population (2006)
  - Total: 264
- Time zone: UTC+3:30 (IRST)
  - Summer (DST): UTC+4:30 (IRDT)

Chasht Khvor (Persian: چاشت خور, also Romanized as Chāsht Khvor, Chāsht Khur, and Chāshtkhvār; also known as Chāsht Khowd and Jāsht Khowr) is a village in Shurab Rural District, in the Central District of Arsanjan County, Fars province, Iran. At the 2006 census, its population was 264, in 62 families.

A rock-cut Achaemenid monument called Qadamgah is located near the village.
