= Ezzabad, Arsanjan =

Ezzabad عزاباد
- Village
- Location within Iran
- Coordinates: 29°47′17″N 53°10′16″E
- Country: Iran
- Province: Fars
- County: Arsanjan
- Bakhsh: Central
- Rural District: Khobriz

Population (2006)
  - Total: 178
- Time zone: UTC+3:30 (IRST)
  - Summer (DST): UTC+4:30 (IRDT)

Ezzabad (Persian: عزاباد, also Romanized as 'Ezzābād; also known as Ez Abad Marvdasht and 'Ezzābād-e Marvdasht) is a village in Khobriz Rural District, in the Central District of Arsanjan County, Fars province, Iran. At the 2006 census, its population was 178, in 38 families.
