= Dehak-e Aliabad =

Dehak-e Aliabad دهک علی‌آباد
- Village
- Location within Iran
- Coordinates: 29°51′53″N 53°19′42″E
- Country: Iran
- Province: Fars
- County: Arsanjan
- Bakhsh: Central
- Rural District: Aliabad-e Malek

Population (2006)
  - Total: 206
- Time zone: UTC+3:30 (IRST)
  - Summer (DST): UTC+4:30 (IRDT)

Dehak-e Aliabad (Persian: دهک علی‌آباد, also Romanized as Dehak-e ʿAlīābād; also known as Dehak) is a village in Aliabad-e Malek Rural District, in the Central District of Arsanjan County, Fars province, Iran. At the 2006 census, its population was 206, in 50 families.
