= Sang Kar =

Sang Kar or Sang-e Kar (Persian: سنگ كر) may refer to:

- Sang Kar, Fars
- Sang Kar, Kerman
- Sang Kar, Lorestan
