= Jamalabad, Arsanjan =

Jamalabad جمال اباد
- Village
- Location within Iran
- Coordinates: 29°59′53″N 53°46′59″E
- Country: Iran
- Province: Fars
- County: Arsanjan
- Bakhsh: Central
- Rural District: Aliabad-e Malek

Population (2006)
  - Total: 1,191
- Time zone: UTC+3:30 (IRST)
  - Summer (DST): UTC+4:30 (IRDT)

Jamalabad (Persian: جمال اباد, also Romanized as Jamālābād; also known as Jamālābād-e Chār Rāh) is a village in Aliabad-e Malek Rural District, in the Central District of Arsanjan County, Fars province, Iran. At the 2006 census, its population was 1,191 across 313 families.
