= Fijan, Fars =

Fijan فيجان
- Village
- Location within Iran
- Coordinates: 29°56′24″N 53°15′00″E
- Country: Iran
- Province: Fars
- County: Arsanjan
- Bakhsh: Central
- Rural District: Aliabad-e Malek

Population (2006)
  - Total: 35
- Time zone: UTC+3:30 (IRST)
  - Summer (DST): UTC+4:30 (IRDT)

Fijan (Persian: فيجان, also Romanized as Fījān) is a village in Aliabad-e Malek Rural District, in the Central District of Arsanjan County, Fars province, Iran. At the 2006 census, its population was 35, in 8 families.
