= Qalat-e Khvar =

Qalat-e Khvar قلات خوار
- Village
- Location within Iran
- Coordinates: 29°50′16″N 53°19′23″E
- Country: Iran
- Province: Fars
- County: Arsanjan
- Bakhsh: Central
- Rural District: Aliabad-e Malek

Population (2006)
  - Total: 466
- Time zone: UTC+3:30 (IRST)
  - Summer (DST): UTC+4:30 (IRDT)

Qalat-e Khvar (Persian: قلات خوار, also Romanized as Qalāt-e Khvār and Qalātkhvār; also known as Ghalatkhar) is a village in Aliabad-e Malek Rural District, in the Central District of Arsanjan County, Fars province, Iran. At the 2006 census, its population was 466, in 119 families.
