= Anarak, Arsanjan =

Anarak انارك
- Village
- Location within Iran
- Coordinates: 29°47′36″N 53°14′25″E
- Country: Iran
- Province: Fars
- County: Arsanjan
- Bakhsh: Central
- Rural District: Khobriz

Population (2006)
  - Total: 206
- Time zone: UTC+3:30 (IRST)
  - Summer (DST): UTC+4:30 (IRDT)

Anarak (Persian: انارك, also Romanized as Anārak; also known as Nārak) is a village in Khobriz Rural District, in the Central District of Arsanjan County, Fars province, Iran. At the 2006 census, its population was 206, in 60 families.
