= Hoseynabad-e Arab Sheybani =

Hoseynabad-e Arab Sheybani حسين ابادعرب شيباني
- Village
- Location within Iran
- Coordinates: 29°45′28″N 53°12′34″E
- Country: Iran
- Province: Fars
- County: Arsanjan
- Bakhsh: Central
- Rural District: Khobriz

Population (2006)
  - Total: 187
- Time zone: UTC+3:30 (IRST)
  - Summer (DST): UTC+4:30 (IRDT)

Hoseynabad-e Arab Sheybani (Persian: حسين ابادعرب شيباني, also Romanized as Ḩoseynābād-e ʿArab Sheybānī; also known as Ḩoseynābād) is a village in Khobriz Rural District, in the Central District of Arsanjan County, Fars province, Iran. At the 2006 census, its population was 187, in 40 families.
