= Rafiabad, Fars =

Rafiabad رفيع اباد
- Village
- Location within Iran
- Coordinates: 29°50′23″N 53°18′55″E
- Country: Iran
- Province: Fars
- County: Arsanjan
- Bakhsh: Central
- Rural District: Aliabad-e Malek

Population (2006)
  - Total: 383
- Time zone: UTC+3:30 (IRST)
  - Summer (DST): UTC+4:30 (IRDT)

Rafiabad (Persian: رفيع اباد, also Romanized as Rafī‘ābād) is a village in Aliabad-e Malek Rural District, in the Central District of Arsanjan County, Fars province, Iran. At the 2006 census, its population was 383, in 94 families.
