= Bazam-e Ahuchar =

Bazam-e Ahuchar بزم اهوچر
- Village
- Country: Iran
- Province: Fars
- County: Arsanjan
- Bakhsh: Central
- Rural District: Aliabad-e Malek

Population (2006)
  - Total: 45
- Time zone: UTC+3:30 (IRST)
  - Summer (DST): UTC+4:30 (IRDT)

Bazam-e Ahuchar (Persian: بزم اهوچر, also Romanized as Bazam-e Āhūchar) is a village in Aliabad-e Malek Rural District, in the Central District of Arsanjan County, Fars province, Iran. At the 2006 census, its population was 45, in 10 families.
