= Kuroshabad =

Kuroshabad كورش اباد
- Village
- Location within Iran
- Coordinates: 29°42′01″N 53°13′12″E
- Country: Iran
- Province: Fars
- County: Arsanjan
- Bakhsh: Central
- Rural District: Shurab

Population (2006)
  - Total: 96
- Time zone: UTC+3:30 (IRST)
  - Summer (DST): UTC+4:30 (IRDT)

Kuroshabad (Persian: كورش اباد, also Romanized as Kūroshābād, Koorosh Abad, and Kūreshābād) is a village in Shurab Rural District, in the Central District of Arsanjan County, Fars province, Iran. At the 2006 census, its population was 96, in 27 families.
