= Qarah Darreh =

Qarah Darreh or Qareh Darreh or Qareh Dareh or Qarahdarreh (Persian: قره دره) may refer to:

- Qareh Darreh, East Azerbaijan
- Qarah Darreh, Fars
- Qarah Darreh, Kurdistan
- Qarah Darreh, Zanjan
- Qareh Darreh, Ijrud, Zanjan Province
