= Darreh Ahaki =

Darreh Ahaki دره اهكي
- Village
- Location within Iran
- Coordinates: 29°48′40″N 53°14′33″E
- Country: Iran
- Province: Fars
- County: Arsanjan
- Bakhsh: Central
- Rural District: Khobriz

Population (2006)
  - Total: 66
- Time zone: UTC+3:30 (IRST)
  - Summer (DST): UTC+4:30 (IRDT)

Darreh Ahaki (Persian: دره اهكي, also Romanized as Darreh Āhakī) is a village in Khobriz Rural District, in the Central District of Arsanjan County, Fars province, Iran. At the 2006 census, its population was 66, in 17 families.
