= Valiabad, Arsanjan =

Valiabad ولي اباد
- Village
- Location within Iran
- Coordinates: 29°47′33″N 53°12′37″E
- Country: Iran
- Province: Fars
- County: Arsanjan
- Bakhsh: Central
- Rural District: Khobriz

Population (2006)
  - Total: 91
- Time zone: UTC+3:30 (IRST)
  - Summer (DST): UTC+4:30 (IRDT)

Valiabad (Persian: ولي اباد, also Romanized as Valīābād) is a village in Khobriz Rural District, in the Central District of Arsanjan County, Fars province, Iran. At the 2006 census, its population was 91, in 21 families.
