= Eslamabad, Arsanjan =

Islamabad اسلام اباد
- Village
- Location within Iran
- Coordinates: 29°57′01″N 53°35′38″E
- Country: Iran
- Province: Fars
- County: Arsanjan
- Bakhsh: Central
- Rural District: Aliabad-e Malek

Population (2006)
  - Total: 208
- Time zone: UTC+3:30 (IRST)
  - Summer (DST): UTC+4:30 (IRDT)

Islamabad (Persian: اسلام آباد, also Romanized as Islāmābād) is a village in Aliabad-e Malek Rural District, in the Central District of Arsanjan County, Fars province, Iran. At the 2006 census, its population was 208, in 39 families.
