= Bikehdan =

Bikehdan بيكهدان
- Village
- Location within Iran
- Coordinates: 29°59′57″N 53°33′51″E
- Country: Iran
- Province: Fars
- County: Arsanjan
- Bakhsh: Central
- Rural District: Aliabad-e Malek

Population (2006)
  - Total: 65
- Time zone: UTC+3:30 (IRST)
  - Summer (DST): UTC+4:30 (IRDT)

Bikehdan (Persian: بيكهدان, also Romanized as Bīkehdān; also known as Bekahdān) is a village in Aliabad-e Malek Rural District, in the Central District of Arsanjan County, Fars province, Iran. At the 2006 census, its population was 65, in 13 families.
