= Kuhanjan, Arsanjan =

Kuhanjan كوهنجان
- Village
- Location within Iran
- Coordinates: 29°44′55″N 53°19′52″E
- Country: Iran
- Province: Fars
- County: Arsanjan
- Bakhsh: Central
- Rural District: Shurab

Population (2006)
  - Total: 809
- Time zone: UTC+3:30 (IRST)
  - Summer (DST): UTC+4:30 (IRDT)

Kuhanjan (Persian: كوهنجان, also Romanized as Kūhanjān) is a village in Shurab Rural District, in the Central District of Arsanjan County, Fars province, Iran. At the 2006 census, its population was 809, in 179 families. Its area code is 712526.
