= Bekahdan =

Bekahdan بكهدان
- Village
- Location within Iran
- Coordinates: 29°49′45″N 53°19′33″E
- Country: Iran
- Province: Fars
- County: Arsanjan
- Bakhsh: Central
- Rural District: Aliabad-e Malek

Population (2006)
  - Total: 817
- Time zone: UTC+3:30 (IRST)
  - Summer (DST): UTC+4:30 (IRDT)

Bekahdan (Persian: بكهدان, also Romanized as Bekahdān; also known as Bekdūn and Qeshlāq) is a village in Aliabad-e Malek Rural District, in the Central District of Arsanjan County, Fars province, Iran. At the 2006 census, its population was 817, in 190 families.
