= Qasr-e Jamal =

Qasr-e Jamal قصرجمال
- Village
- Location within Iran
- Coordinates: 29°46′43″N 53°16′18″E
- Country: Iran
- Province: Fars
- County: Arsanjan
- Bakhsh: Central
- Rural District: Khobriz

Population (2006)
  - Total: 93
- Time zone: UTC+3:30 (IRST)
  - Summer (DST): UTC+4:30 (IRDT)

Qasr-e Jamal (Persian: قصرجمال, also Romanized as Qaşr-e Jamāl and Qasr-i-Jamāl) is a village in Khobriz Rural District, in the Central District of Arsanjan County, Fars province, Iran. At the 2006 census, its population was 93, in 17 families.
