= Deh Now, Arsanjan =

Deh Now ده نو
- Village
- Location within Iran
- Coordinates: 29°46′10″N 53°12′15″E
- Country: Iran
- Province: Fars
- County: Arsanjan
- Bakhsh: Central
- Rural District: Khobriz

Population (2006)
  - Total: 211
- Time zone: UTC+3:30 (IRST)
  - Summer (DST): UTC+4:30 (IRDT)

Deh Now (Persian: ده نو, also Romanized as Deh-e Now; also known as Deh Now Naşīrābād) is a village in Khobriz Rural District, in the Central District of Arsanjan County, Fars province, Iran. At the 2006 census, its population was 211, in 50 families.
