= Bagh-e Tir-e Hajjiabad =

Bagh-e Tir-e Hajjiabad باغ تيرحاجي اباد
- Village
- Location within Iran
- Coordinates: 29°47′34″N 53°13′45″E
- Country: Iran
- Province: Fars
- County: Arsanjan
- Bakhsh: Central
- Rural District: Khobriz

Population (2006)
  - Total: 82
- Time zone: UTC+3:30 (IRST)
  - Summer (DST): UTC+4:30 (IRDT)

Bagh-e Tir-e Hajjiabad (Persian: باغ تيرحاجي اباد, also Romanized as Bāgh-e Tīr-e Ḩājjīābād; also known as Bāgh-e Tīr and Bāgh Tīr) is a village in Khobriz Rural District, in the Central District of Arsanjan County, Fars province, Iran. At the 2006 census, its population was 82, in 21 families.
