= Jolow Dar =

Jolow Dar جلودر
- Village
- Location within Iran
- Coordinates: 29°47′19″N 53°09′24″E
- Country: Iran
- Province: Fars
- County: Arsanjan
- Bakhsh: Central
- Rural District: Khobriz

Population (2006)
  - Total: 657
- Time zone: UTC+3:30 (IRST)
  - Summer (DST): UTC+4:30 (IRDT)

Jolow Dar (Persian: جلودر, also Romanized as Jolow Dār and Jelow Dar) is a village in Khobriz Rural District, in the Central District of Arsanjan County, Fars province, Iran. At the 2006 census, its population was 657, in 148 families.
