= Hasanabad, Arsanjan =

Hasanabad حسن اباد
- Village
- Location within Iran
- Coordinates: 29°47′28″N 53°10′48″E
- Country: Iran
- Province: Fars
- County: Arsanjan
- Bakhsh: Central
- Rural District: Khobriz

Population (2006)
  - Total: 452
- Time zone: UTC+3:30 (IRST)
  - Summer (DST): UTC+4:30 (IRDT)

Hasanabad (Persian: حسن اباد, romanized: Ḩasanābād) is a village in Khobriz Rural District, in the Central District of Arsanjan County, Fars province, Iran. At the 2006 census, its population was 452, across 92 families.
