= Aliabad-e Salar =

Aliabad-e Salar علی‌آباد سالار
- Village
- Location within Iran
- Coordinates: 29°46′16″N 53°11′05″E
- Country: Iran
- Province: Fars
- County: Arsanjan
- Bakhsh: Central
- Rural District: Khobriz

Population (2006)
  - Total: 527
- Time zone: UTC+3:30 (IRST)
  - Summer (DST): UTC+4:30 (IRDT)

Aliabad-e Salar (Persian: علی‌آباد سالار, also Romanized as 'Alīābād-e Sālār; also known as 'Alīābād) is a village in Khobriz Rural District, in the Central District of Arsanjan County, Fars province, Iran. At the 2006 census, its population was 527, in 120 families.
