= Ziadabad =

Ziadabad or Zeyadabad (Persian: زياداباد) may refer to:

- Ziadabad, Arsanjan, Fars Province
- Ziadabad, Fasa, Fars Province
- Ziadabad, Sepidan, Fars Province
- Ziadabad, Isfahan
- Ziadabad, Kerman
- Ziadabad, Markazi
