= Ziadabad, Arsanjan =

Ziadabad زياداباد
- Village
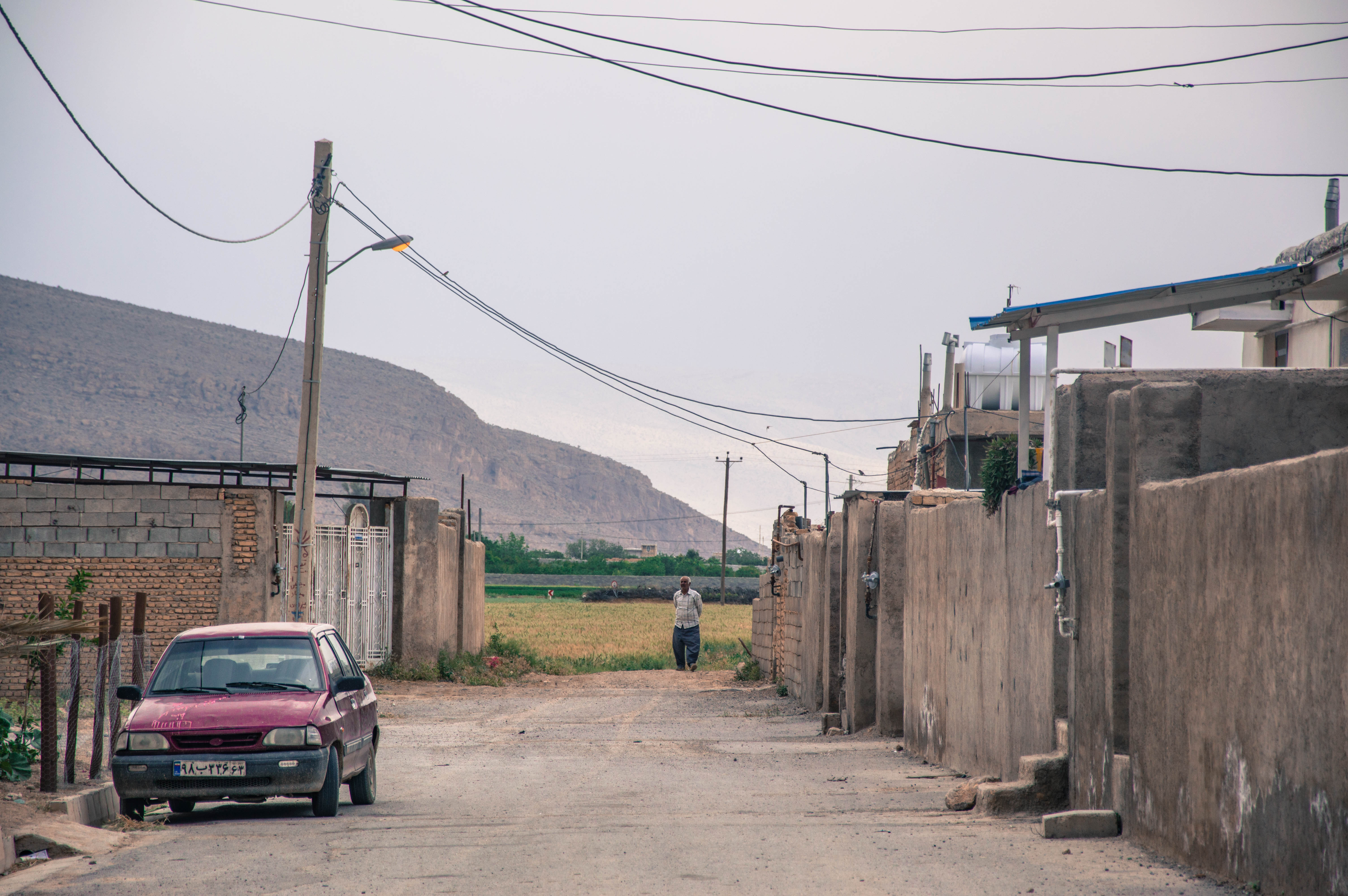

- Location within Iran
- Coordinates: 29°48′28″N 53°15′05″E
- Country: Iran
- Province: Fars
- County: Arsanjan
- Bakhsh: Central
- Rural District: Khobriz

Population (2006)
  - Total: 387
- Time zone: UTC+3:30 (IRST)
  - Summer (DST): UTC+4:30 (IRDT)

Ziadabad (Persian: زياداباد, also Romanized as Zīādābād and Zeyādābād) is a village in Khobriz Rural District, in the Central District of Arsanjan County, Fars province, Iran. At the 2006 census, its population was 387, in 110 families.
