= Moqbelabad, Fars =

Moqbelabad مقبل اباد
- Village
- Location within Iran
- Coordinates: 29°42′32″N 53°15′27″E
- Country: Iran
- Province: Fars
- County: Arsanjan
- Bakhsh: Central
- Rural District: Shurab

Population (2006)
  - Total: 272
- Time zone: UTC+3:30 (IRST)
  - Summer (DST): UTC+4:30 (IRDT)

Moqbelabad (Persian: مقبل اباد, also Romanized as Moqbelābād; also known as Moghbel Abad) is a village in Shurab Rural District, in the Central District of Arsanjan County, Fars province, Iran. At the 2006 census, its population was 272, in 64 families.
