= Do Kuhak, Arsanjan =

Village in Fars, Iran

Do Kuhak دوكوهك
- Village
- Location within Iran
- Coordinates: 29°40′46″N 53°15′47″E
- Country: Iran
- Province: Fars
- County: Arsanjan
- Bakhsh: Central
- Rural District: Shurab

Population (2006)
  - Total: 261
- Time zone: UTC+3:30 (IRST)
  - Summer (DST): UTC+4:30 (IRDT)

Do Kuhak (Persian: دوكوهك, also Romanized as Do Kūhak) is a village in Shurab Rural District, in the Central District of Arsanjan County, Fars province, Iran. At the 2006 census, its population was 261, in 60 families.
