= Kalagh Jiru =

Kalagh Jiru كلاغ جيرو
- Village
- Location within Iran
- Coordinates: 29°44′03″N 53°21′18″E
- Country: Iran
- Province: Fars
- County: Arsanjan
- Bakhsh: Central
- Rural District: Shurab

Population (2006)
  - Total: 515
- Time zone: UTC+3:30 (IRST)
  - Summer (DST): UTC+4:30 (IRDT)

Kalagh Jiru (Persian: كلاغ جيرو, also Romanized as Kalāgh Jīrū; also known as Jerū and Kalāgh) is a village in Shurab Rural District, in the Central District of Arsanjan County, Fars province, Iran. At the 2006 census, its population was 515, in 116 families. According to 2006 census, the area had a population of 515.
