= Aliabad-e Malek =

Village in Fars province, Iran

Aliabad-e Malek Persian: علی‌آباد ملک
- Village
- Location within Iran
- Coordinates: 29°51′41″N 53°19′49″E
- Country: Iran
- Province: Fars
- County: Arsanjan
- District: Central
- Rural District: Aliabad-e Malek

Population (2016)
  - Total: 1,877
- Time zone: UTC+3:30 (IRST)

Aliabad-e Malek (Persian: علی‌آباد ملک) (Note: Also romanized as ‘Alīābād-e Malek; also known as ‘Alīābād) is a village in, and the capital of, Aliabad-e Malek Rural District (Note: Formerly Arsanjan Rural District) of the Central District of Arsanjan County, Fars province, Iran.

== Demographics ==
=== Population ===
At the time of the 2006 National Census, the village's population was 1,592 in 392 households. The following census in 2011 counted 1,807 people in 513 households. The 2016 census measured the population of the village as 1,877 people in 596 households. It was the most populous village in its rural district.
