= Safarabad, Fars =

Safarabad صفراباد
- Village
- Location within Iran
- Coordinates: 29°46′09″N 53°16′49″E
- Country: Iran
- Province: Fars
- County: Arsanjan
- Bakhsh: Central
- Rural District: Khobriz

Population (2006)
  - Total: 143
- Time zone: UTC+3:30 (IRST)
  - Summer (DST): UTC+4:30 (IRDT)

Safarabad (Persian: صفراباد, also Romanized as Şafarābād and Safarābād) is a village in Khobriz Rural District, in the Central District of Arsanjan County, Fars province, Iran. At the 2006 census, its population was 143, in 36 families.
