= Khobriz =

Village in Fars province, Iran

Khobriz Persian: خبريز
- Village
- Location within Iran
- Coordinates: 29°46′37″N 53°14′40″E
- Country: Iran
- Province: Fars
- County: Arsanjan
- District: Central
- Rural District: Khobriz

Population (2016)
  - Total: 1,733
- Time zone: UTC+3:30 (IRST)

Khobriz (Persian: خبريز) (Note: Also romanized as Khobrīz; also known as Khūb Rīz and Khūbrīz) is a village in, and the capital of, Khobriz Rural District of the Central District of Arsanjan County, Fars province, Iran.

== Demographics ==
=== Population ===
At the time of the 2006 National Census, the village's population was 1,384 in 316 households. The following census in 2011 counted 1,423 people in 380 households. The 2016 census measured the population of the village as 1,733 people in 525 households. It was the most populous village in its rural district.
