= Qarah Darreh, Fars =

Qarah Darreh قره دره
- Village
- Location within Iran
- Coordinates: 29°47′31″N 53°31′35″E
- Country: Iran
- Province: Fars
- County: Arsanjan
- Bakhsh: Central
- Rural District: Aliabad-e Malek

Population (2006)
  - Total: 26
- Time zone: UTC+3:30 (IRST)
  - Summer (DST): UTC+4:30 (IRDT)

Qarah Darreh (Persian: قره دره, also Romanized as Qarahdarreh) is a village in Aliabad-e Malek Rural District, in the Central District of Arsanjan County, Fars province, Iran. At the 2006 census, its population was 26, in 7 families.
