= Javadiyeh, Arsanjan =

Javadiyeh جواديه
- Village
- Country: Iran
- Province: Fars
- County: Arsanjan
- Bakhsh: Central
- Rural District: Shurab

Population (2006)
  - Total: 1,021
- Time zone: UTC+3:30 (IRST)
  - Summer (DST): UTC+4:30 (IRDT)

Javadiyeh (Persian: جواديه, also Romanized as Javādīyeh) is a village in Shurab Rural District, in the Central District of Arsanjan County, Fars province, Iran. At the 2006 census, its population was 1,021, in 214 families.
