= Deh Bid, Arsanjan =

Deh Bid ده بيد
- Village
- Location within Iran
- Coordinates: 29°47′37″N 53°11′33″E
- Country: Iran
- Province: Fars
- County: Arsanjan
- Bakhsh: Central
- Rural District: Khobriz

Population (2006)
  - Total: 483
- Time zone: UTC+3:30 (IRST)
  - Summer (DST): UTC+4:30 (IRDT)

Deh Bid (Persian: ده بيد, also Romanized as Deh Bīd and Deh-e Bīd) is a village in Khobriz Rural District, in the Central District of Arsanjan County, Fars province, Iran. At the 2006 census, its population was 483, in 105 families.
