= Sang Kar, Fars =

Village in Fars province, Iran

Sang Kar سنگ كر
- Village
- Location within Iran
- Coordinates: 29°47′42″N 53°25′54″E
- Country: Iran
- Province: Fars
- County: Arsanjan
- District: Central
- Rural District: Aliabad-e Malek

Population (2006)
  - Total: 220
- Time zone: UTC+3:30 (IRST)
  - Summer (DST): UTC+4:30 (IRDT)

Sang Kar (Persian: سنگ كر, also Romanized as Sang-e Kar; also known as Sangar) is a village in Aliabad-e Malek Rural District, Central District, Arsanjan County, Fars province, Iran.

At the 2006 census, its population was 220, in 51 families.
