= Abdalabad =

Abdalabad or Ebdalabad (Persian: ابدال اباد) may refer to:

- Ebdalabad, Chaharmahal and Bakhtiari
- Abdalabad, Razavi Khorasan

== See also ==
- Abdolabad (disambiguation)
