= Abdullahabad =

Abdullahabad may refer to:

- Abdolabad (disambiguation)
- Abdollahabad (disambiguation)
