= Mehrian, Arsanjan =

Mehrian مهريان
- Village
- Location within Iran
- Coordinates: 29°48′14″N 53°14′47″E
- Country: Iran
- Province: Fars
- County: Arsanjan
- Bakhsh: Central
- Rural District: Khobriz

Population (2006)
  - Total: 246
- Time zone: UTC+3:30 (IRST)
  - Summer (DST): UTC+4:30 (IRDT)

Mehrian (Persian: مهريان, also romanized as Mehrīān) is a village in Khobriz Rural District, in the Central District of Arsanjan County, Fars province, Iran. At the 2006 census, its population was 246, in 66 families.
