= Shurab, Arsanjan =

Village in Fars province, Iran

Shurab Persian: شوراب
- Village
- Location within Iran
- Coordinates: 29°44′34″N 53°16′06″E
- Country: Iran
- Province: Fars
- County: Arsanjan
- District: Central
- Rural District: Shurab

Population (2016)
  - Total: 1,325
- Time zone: UTC+3:30 (IRST)

Shurab (Persian: شوراب) (Note: Also romanized as Shūrāb) is a village in, and the capital of, Shurab Rural District of the Central District of Arsanjan County, Fars province, Iran.

== Demographics ==
=== Population ===
At the time of the 2006 National Census, the village's population was 765 in 171 households. The following census in 2011 counted 662 people in 202 households. The 2016 census measured the population of the village as 1,325 people in 405 households. It was the most populous village in its rural district.
