= Moqbelabad =

Moqbelabad (Persian: مقبل اباد) may refer to:

- Moqbelabad, Fars
- Moqbelabad, Qom
