= Shurab Rural District =

Shurab Rural District (Persian: دهستان شوراب) may refer to:

- Shurab Rural District (Fars Province)
- Shurab Rural District (Lorestan Province)
