= Gud Qalat Castle =

Castle in Fars province, Iran

Gud Qalat castle
- قلعه گود قلات

General information
- Type: Castle
- Location: Arsanjan County, Iran

Gud Qalat castle (Persian: قلعه گود قلات) is a historical castle located in Arsanjan County in Fars province, The longevity of this fortress dates back to the Sasanian Empire.
