= Gachi Castle =

Castle in Fars province, Iran

Gachi castle
- قلعه گچی
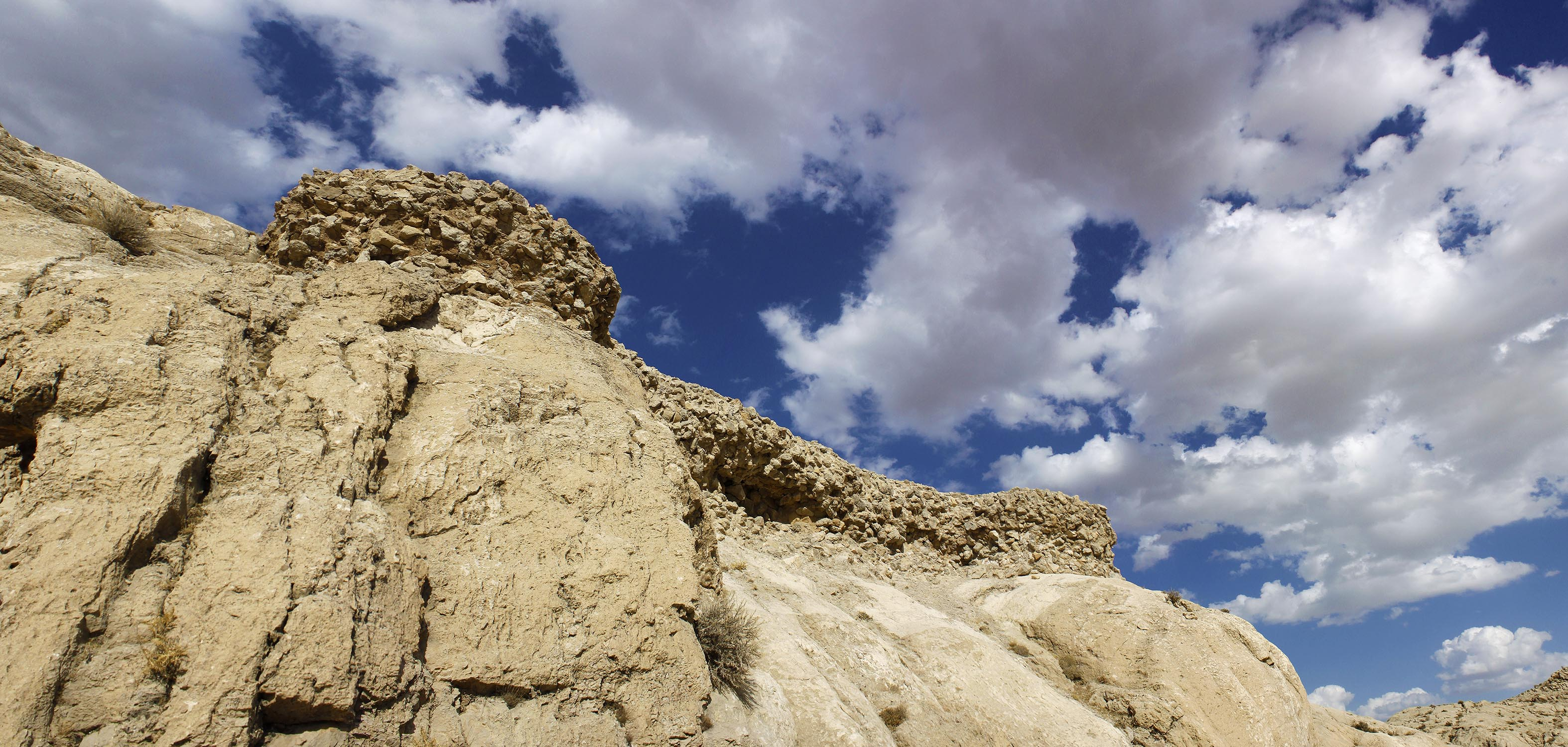

General information
- Type: Castle
- Location: Arsanjan County, Iran

Gachi castle (Persian: قلعه گچی) is a historical castle located in Arsanjan County in Fars province, The longevity of this fortress dates back to the Early centuries of historical periods after Islam.
