= Qalat Khawari Castle =

Castle in Fars province, Iran

Qalat Khawari castle
- قلعه قلات خواری

General information
- Type: Castle
- Location: Arsanjan County, Iran

Qalat Khawari castle (Persian: قلعه قلات خواری) is a historical castle located in Arsanjan County in Fars province, The longevity of this fortress dates back to the Sasanian Empire.
