= Abdollahabad, Fars =

Abdollahabad عبدالله‌آباد
- Village
- Location within Iran
- Coordinates: 29°45′03″N 53°13′54″E
- Country: Iran
- Province: Fars
- County: Arsanjan
- Bakhsh: Central
- Rural District: Khobriz

Population (2006)
  - Total: 197
- Time zone: UTC+3:30 (IRST)
  - Summer (DST): UTC+4:30 (IRDT)

Abdollahabad (Persian: عبدالله‌آباد, also Romanized as 'Abdollahābād; also known as 'Abdolābād) is a village in Khobriz Rural District, in the Central District of Arsanjan County, Fars province, Iran. At the 2006 census, its population was 197, in 49 families.
