= Sorkhabad =

Sorkhabad (Persian: سرخ اباد), also rendered as Surkhabad, may refer to:

- Sorkhabad, Fars
- Sorkhabad, Hamadan
- Sorkhabad, Mazandaran
- Sorkhabad, Razavi Khorasan
- Sorkhabad, Zanjan
