= Jeru =

Jeru may refer to:

- Gerry Mulligan or Jeru, American musician (1927–1996)
- Jeru the Damaja, American musician (born 1972)
- Jeru people, an indigenous tribe of the Andaman Islands
- Jeru language or Aka-Jeru, spoken by the Jeru
- Jeru, Iran, a village in Fars Province, Iran
- Jeru (album), a 1962 album recorded by American jazz saxophonist and bandleader Gerry Mulligan
