= Mehrian =

Mehrian or Mehreyan or Mehriyan (Persian: مهريان) may refer to:

- Mehrian, Arsanjan, Fars Province
- Mehrian, Shiraz, Fars Province
- Mehrian, Kohgiluyeh and Boyer-Ahmad
