= Qohab-e Sarsar Rural District =

Rural district in Semnan province, Iran

Qohab-e Sarsar Rural District Persian: دهستان قهاب صرصر
- Rural District
- Location within Iran
- Coordinates: 36°02′N 54°08′E
- Country: Iran
- Province: Semnan
- County: Damghan
- District: Amirabad
- Established: 1987
- Capital: Seydabad

Population (2016)
  - Total: 1,863
- Time zone: UTC+3:30 (IRST)

Qohab-e Sarsar Rural District (Persian: دهستان قهاب صرصر) is in Amirabad District of Damghan County, Semnan province, Iran. Its capital is the village of Seydabad.

== Demographics ==
=== Population ===
At the time of the 2006 National Census, the rural district's population was 1,559 in 531 households. There were 1,429 inhabitants in 495 households at the following census of 2011. The 2016 census measured the population of the rural district as 1,863 in 684 households. The most populous of its 55 villages was Seydabad, with 521 people.

=== Other villages in the rural district ===
- Abdollahabad
- Amravan
- Dowlatabad
- Firuzabad
- Hajjaji
- Raziabad
