= Qarah Qeshlaq, Zanjan =

Village in Zanjan province, Iran

Qarah Qeshlaq Persian: قره‌قشلاق
- Village
- Location within Iran
- Coordinates: 36°26′51″N 47°43′42″E
- Country: Iran
- Province: Zanjan
- County: Mahneshan
- District: Anguran
- Rural District: Qaleh Juq

Population (2016)
  - Total: 147
- Time zone: UTC+3:30 (IRST)

Qarah Qeshlaq (Persian: قره‌قشلاق) (Note: Also romanized as Qarah Qeshlāq; also known as Qal‘eh Qeshlāq and Qiz Qeshlaq (قیز قشلاق)) is a village in Qaleh Juq Rural District of Anguran District in Mahneshan County, Zanjan province, Iran.

== Demographics ==
=== Population ===
At the time of the 2006 National Census, the village's population was 211 in 42 households. The following census in 2011 counted 158 people in 53 households. The 2016 census measured the population of the village as 147 people in 45 households.
