= Qaleh Juq Rural District =

Rural district in Zanjan province, Iran

Qaleh Juq Rural District Persian: دهستان قلعه جوق
- Rural District
- Location within Iran
- Coordinates: 36°28′N 47°48′E
- Country: Iran
- Province: Zanjan
- County: Mahneshan
- District: Anguran
- Established: 1987
- Capital: Suntu

Population (2016)
  - Total: 4,496
- Time zone: UTC+3:30 (IRST)

Qaleh Juq Rural District (Persian: دهستان قلعه جوق) is in Anguran District of Mahneshan County, Zanjan province, Iran. Its capital is the village of Suntu.

== Demographics ==
=== Population ===
At the time of the 2006 National Census, the rural district's population was 5,795 in 1,288 households. There were 4,997 inhabitants in 1,542 households at the following census of 2011. The 2016 census measured the population of the rural district as 4,496 in 1,437 households. The most populous of its 32 villages was Duzkand, with 556 people.

=== Other villages in the rural district ===
- Chahar Taq
- Ebrahimabad
- Emam Kandi
- Eymir
- Gav Gol
- Hamzehabad
- Idahlu
- Kahriz Beyk
- Moghanlu
- Owchtash
- Owgholbeyk-e Olya
- Qaleh Juq-e Siah Mansur
- Qarah Darreh
- Qarah Qeshlaq
- Qarayi
- Qasemabad
- Tabrizak
- Tutaghaji
- Vazmak
