= Idahlu, Mahneshan =

Village in Zanjan province, Iran

Idahlu Persian: ايده لو
- Village
- Location within Iran
- Coordinates: 36°28′13″N 47°49′59″E
- Country: Iran
- Province: Zanjan
- County: Mahneshan
- District: Anguran
- Rural District: Qaleh Juq

Population (2016)
  - Total: 222
- Time zone: UTC+3:30 (IRST)

Idahlu (Persian: ايده لو) (Note: Also romanized as Eydehlū, Īdahlū, Idahlū, Idehloo, and Īdehlū; also known as Eydlū and Īdalu) is a village in Qaleh Juq Rural District of Anguran District in Mahneshan County, Zanjan province, Iran.

== Demographics ==
=== Population ===
At the time of the 2006 National Census, the village's population was 217 in 42 households. The following census in 2011 counted 221 people in 66 households. The 2016 census measured the population of the village as 222 people in 65 households.
