= Gav Gol =

Village in Zanjan province, Iran

Gav Gol Persian: گاوگل
- Village
- Location within Iran
- Coordinates: 36°24′27″N 47°46′34″E
- Country: Iran
- Province: Zanjan
- County: Mahneshan
- District: Anguran
- Rural District: Qaleh Juq

Population (2016)
  - Total: 76
- Time zone: UTC+3:30 (IRST)

Gav Gol (Persian: گاوگل) (Note: Also romanized as Gāv Gol; also known as Gāf Gol and Gāvkol) is a village in Qaleh Juq Rural District of Anguran District in Mahneshan County, Zanjan province, Iran.

== Demographics ==
=== Population ===
At the time of the 2006 National Census, the village's population was 135 in 30 households. The following census in 2011 counted 81 people in 28 households. The 2016 census measured the population of the village as 70 people in 21 households.
