= Moghanlu, Anguran =

Village in Zanjan province, Iran

Moghanlu Persian: مغانلو
- Village
- Location within Iran
- Coordinates: 36°28′27″N 47°43′54″E
- Country: Iran
- Province: Zanjan
- County: Mahneshan
- District: Anguran
- Rural District: Qaleh Juq

Population (2016)
  - Total: 92
- Time zone: UTC+3:30 (IRST)

Moghanlu (Persian: مغانلو) (Note: Also romanized as Moghānlū) is a village in Qaleh Juq Rural District of Anguran District in Mahneshan County, Zanjan province, Iran.

== Demographics ==
=== Population ===
At the time of the 2006 National Census, the village's population was 193 in 42 households. The following census in 2011 counted 122 people in 39 households. The 2016 census measured the population of the village as 92 people in 27 households.
