= Chahar Taq, Zanjan =

Village in Zanjan province, Iran

Chahar Taq Persian: چهارطاق
- Village
- Location within Iran
- Coordinates: 36°25′40″N 47°45′32″E
- Country: Iran
- Province: Zanjan
- County: Mahneshan
- District: Anguran
- Rural District: Qaleh Juq

Population (2016)
  - Total: 76
- Time zone: UTC+3:30 (IRST)

Chahar Taq (Persian: چهارطاق) (Note: Also romanized as Chahār Ţāq) is a village in Qaleh Juq Rural District of Anguran District in Mahneshan County, Zanjan province, Iran.

== Demographics ==
=== Population ===
At the time of the 2006 National Census, the village's population was 121 in 24 households. The following census in 2011 counted 82 people in 22 households. The 2016 census measured the population of the village as 76 people in 22 households.
