= Owgholbeyk-e Olya =

Village in Zanjan province, Iran

Owgholbeyk-e Olya Persian: اوغلبيک عليا
- Village
- Location within Iran
- Coordinates: 36°30′04″N 47°56′36″E
- Country: Iran
- Province: Zanjan
- County: Mahneshan
- District: Anguran
- Rural District: Qaleh Juq

Population (2016)
  - Total: 287
- Time zone: UTC+3:30 (IRST)

Owgholbeyk-e Olya (Persian: اوغلبيک عليا) (Note: Formerly known as Ogholbeyk-e Duzkand (اوغلبيك دوزكند), also romanized as Ogholbeyk-e Dūzkand; also known as Oghlībeyk and Ogholbeyk) is a village in Qaleh Juq Rural District of Anguran District in Mahneshan County, Zanjan province, Iran.

== Demographics ==
=== Population ===
At the time of the 2006 National Census, the village's population was 480 in 109 households. The following census in 2011 counted 404 people in 126 households. The 2016 census measured the population of the village as 287 people in 95 households.
