= Hamzehabad, Zanjan =

Village in Zanjan province, Iran

Hamzehabad Persian: حمزه اباد
- Village
- Location within Iran
- Coordinates: 36°32′12″N 47°48′16″E
- Country: Iran
- Province: Zanjan
- County: Mahneshan
- District: Anguran
- Rural District: Qaleh Juq

Population (2016)
  - Total: 49
- Time zone: UTC+3:30 (IRST)

Hamzehabad (Persian: حمزه اباد) (Note: Also romanized as Ḩamzehābād; formerly known as Ḩamzeh Khān (حمزه‌خان)) is a village in Qaleh Juq Rural District of Anguran District in Mahneshan County, Zanjan province, Iran.

== Demographics ==
=== Population ===
At the time of the 2006 National Census, the village's population was 49 in 10 households. The following census in 2011 counted 34 people in nine households. The 2016 census measured the population of the village as 49 people in 18 households.
