= Vazmak =

Village in Zanjan province, Iran

Vazmak Persian: گاوگل
- Village
- Location within Iran
- Coordinates: 36°24′00″N 47°48′13″E
- Country: Iran
- Province: Zanjan
- County: Mahneshan
- District: Anguran
- Rural District: Qaleh Juq

Population (2016)
  - Total: 187
- Time zone: UTC+3:30 (IRST)

Vazmak (Persian: وزمك) (Note: Also known as Vīzmak) is a village in Qaleh Juq Rural District of Anguran District in Mahneshan County, Zanjan province, Iran.

== Demographics ==
=== Population ===
At the time of the 2006 National Census, the village's population was 201 in 42 households. The following census in 2011 counted 197 people in 52 households. The 2016 census measured the population of the village as 187 people in 48 households.
