= Firuzabad, Amirabad =

Village in Semnan province, Iran

Firuzabad Persian: فيروز آباد
- Village
- Location within Iran
- Country: Iran
- Province: Semnan
- County: Damghan
- District: Amirabad
- Rural District: Qohab-e Sarsar

Population (2016)
  - Total: 119
- Time zone: UTC+3:30 (IRST)

Firuzabad (Persian: فيروز آباد) (Note: Also romanized as Fīrūzābād) is a village in Qohab-e Sarsar Rural District of Amirabad District in Damghan County, Semnan province, Iran.

== Demographics ==
=== Population ===
At the time of the 2006 National Census, the village's population was 26 in 16 households. The following census in 2011 counted 12 people in five households. The 2016 census measured the population of the village as 119 people in 50 households.
