= Hajjaji =

Village in Semnan province, Iran

Hajjaji Persian: حجاجي
- Village
- Location within Iran
- Coordinates: 36°03′48″N 54°10′27″E
- Country: Iran
- Province: Semnan
- County: Damghan
- District: Amirabad
- Rural District: Qohab-e Sarsar

Population (2016)
  - Total: 140
- Time zone: UTC+3:30 (IRST)

Hajjaji (Persian: حجاجي) (Note: Also romanized as Ḩajjājī) is a village in Qohab-e Sarsar Rural District of Amirabad District in Damghan County, Semnan province, Iran.

== Demographics ==
=== Population ===
At the time of the 2006 National Census, the village's population was 96 in 29 households. The following census in 2011 counted 47 people in 18 households. The 2016 census measured the population of the village as 140 people in 53 households.
