= Arsanjan =

City in Fars province, Iran

Arsanjan Persian: ارسنجان
- City
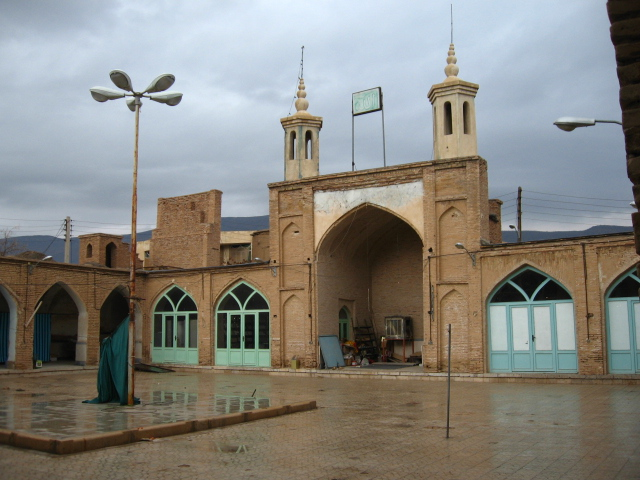
- Jameh Mosque of Arsanjan

- Location within Iran
- Coordinates: 29°54′51″N 53°18′21″E
- Country: Iran
- Province: Fars
- County: Arsanjan
- District: Central
- Elevation: 1,638 m (5,374 ft)

Population (2016)
  - Total: 17,706
- Time zone: UTC+3:30 (IRST)
- Area code: 071-4352

Arsanjan (Persian: ارسنجان) (Note: Also romanized as Arsanjān and Arsenjān; also known as Arsinjān) is a city in the Central District of Arsanjan County, Fars province, Iran, serving as capital of both the county and the district. Prior to the establishment of the county, it was the capital of the former Arsanjan District in Marvdasht County. It is at an altitude of 1,638 metres (5,374 ft).

== Demographics ==
=== Population ===
At the time of the 2006 National Census, the city's population was 17,642 in 4,397 households. The following census in 2011 counted 17,382 people in 4,674 households. The 2016 census measured the population of the city as 17,706 people in 5,284 households.

== Notable people ==
- Ali Akbar Kalantari, Shia cleric
