= Tutaghaji =

Village in Zanjan province, Iran

Tutaghaji Persian: توت اغاجي
- Village
- Location within Iran
- Coordinates: 36°33′43″N 47°47′07″E
- Country: Iran
- Province: Zanjan
- County: Mahneshan
- District: Anguran
- Rural District: Qaleh Juq

Population (2016)
  - Total: 34
- Time zone: UTC+3:30 (IRST)

Tutaghaji (Persian: توت اغاجي) (Note: Also romanized as Tūtāghājī; also known as Tūt Āqā Jānī) is a village in Qaleh Juq Rural District of Anguran District in Mahneshan County, Zanjan province, Iran.

== Demographics ==
=== Population ===
At the time of the 2006 National Census, the village's population was 41 in 10 households. The following census in 2011 counted 38 people in nine households. The 2016 census measured the population of the village as 34 people in 10 households.
