= Suntu =

Village in Zanjan province, Iran

Suntu Persian: سونتو
- Village
- Location within Iran
- Coordinates: 36°29′03″N 47°46′44″E
- Country: Iran
- Province: Zanjan
- County: Mahneshan
- District: Anguran
- Rural District: Qaleh Juq

Population (2016)
  - Total: 466
- Time zone: UTC+3:30 (IRST)

Suntu (Persian: سونتو) (Note: Also romanized as Seventū and Sūntū) is a village in, and the capital of, Qaleh Juq Rural District in Anguran District of Mahneshan County, Zanjan province, Iran.

== Demographics ==
=== Population ===
At the time of the 2006 National Census, the village's population was 465 in 98 households. The following census in 2011 counted 410 people in 127 households. The 2016 census measured the population of the village as 466 people in 144 households.
