= Qaleh Juq-e Siah Mansur =

Village in Zanjan province, Iran

Qaleh Juq-e Siah Mansur Persian: قلعه جوق سياه منصور
- Village
- Location within Iran
- Coordinates: 36°25′11″N 47°51′01″E
- Country: Iran
- Province: Zanjan
- County: Mahneshan
- District: Anguran
- Rural District: Qaleh Juq

Population (2016)
  - Total: 437
- Time zone: UTC+3:30 (IRST)

Qaleh Juq-e Siah Mansur (Persian: قلعه جوق سياه منصور) (Note: Also romanized as Qal‘eh Jūq-e Sīāh Mansūr) is a village in Qaleh Juq Rural District of Anguran District in Mahneshan County, Zanjan province, Iran.

== Demographics ==
=== Population ===
At the time of the 2006 National Census, the village's population was 634 in 166 households. The following census in 2011 counted 558 people in 187 households. The 2016 census measured the population of the village as 437 people in 153 households.
