= Kahriz Beyk =

Village in Zanjan province, Iran

Kahriz Beyk Persian: كهريزبيك
- Village
- Location within Iran
- Coordinates: 36°33′22″N 47°53′39″E
- Country: Iran
- Province: Zanjan
- County: Mahneshan
- District: Anguran
- Rural District: Qaleh Juq

Population (2016)
  - Total: 318
- Time zone: UTC+3:30 (IRST)

Kahriz Beyk (Persian: كهريزبيك) (Note: Also romanized as Kahrīz Beyk; also known as Kahrīz) is a village in Qaleh Juq Rural District of Anguran District in Mahneshan County, Zanjan province, Iran.

== Demographics ==
=== Population ===
At the time of the 2006 National Census, the village's population was 444 in 105 households. The following census in 2011 counted 377 people in 122 households. The 2016 census measured the population of the village as 318 people in 103 households.
