= Qasemabad, Zanjan =

Village in Zanjan province, Iran

Qasemabad Persian: قاسم اباد
- Village
- Location within Iran
- Coordinates: 36°31′47″N 47°45′11″E
- Country: Iran
- Province: Zanjan
- County: Mahneshan
- District: Anguran
- Rural District: Qaleh Juq

Population (2016)
  - Total: 33
- Time zone: UTC+3:30 (IRST)

Qasemabad (Persian: قاسم اباد) (Note: Also romanized as Qāsemābād) is a village in Qaleh Juq Rural District of Anguran District in Mahneshan County, Zanjan province, Iran.

== Demographics ==
=== Population ===
At the time of the 2006 National Census, the village's population was 58 in 15 households. The following census in 2011 counted 50 people in 15 households. The 2016 census measured the population of the village as 33 people in 11 households.
