= Qadamgah (ancient site) =

Rock-cut monument in Fars, Iran

- قدمگاه (Persian)
- Chasht-Khor
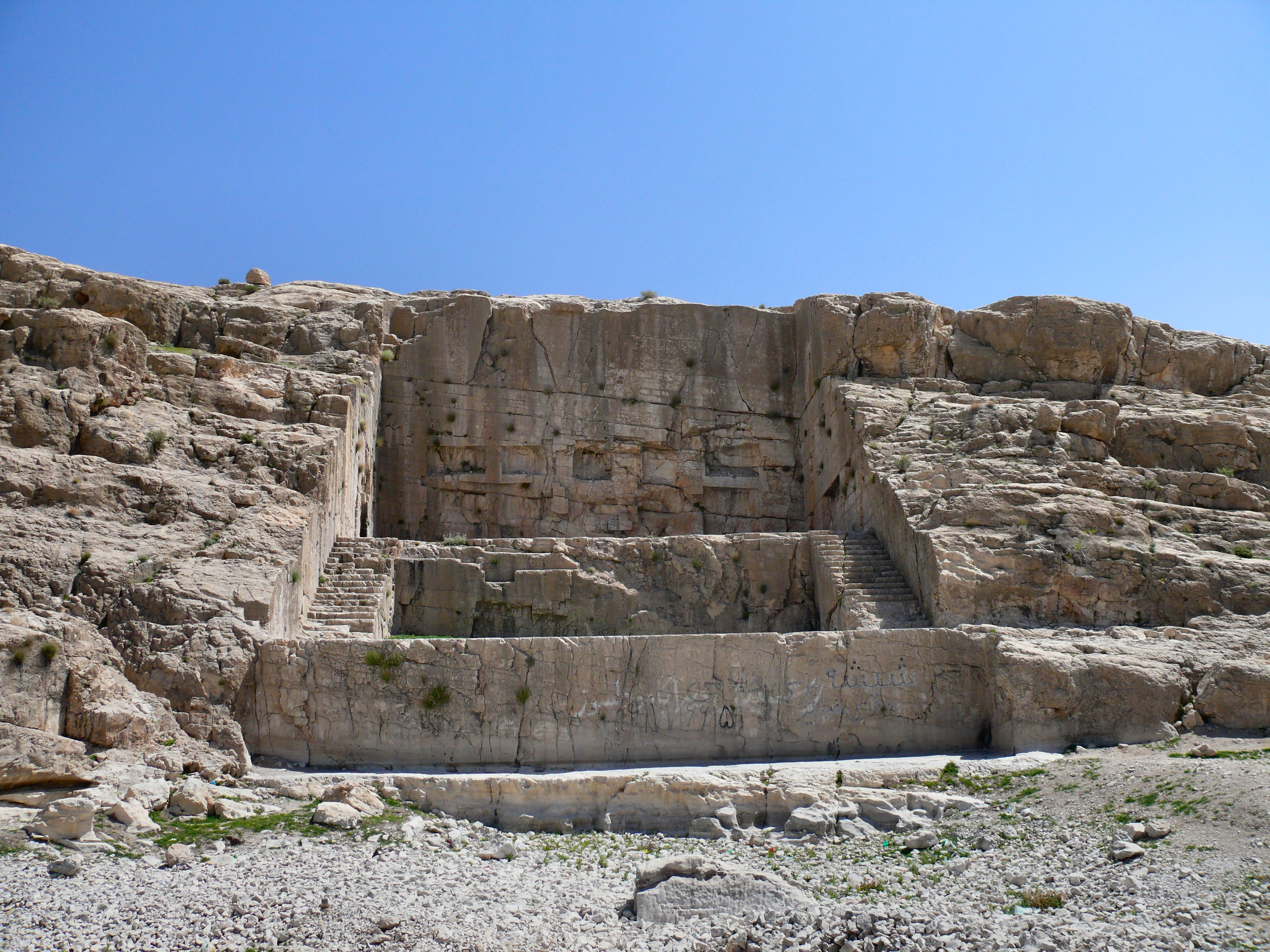
- Qadamgah monument

- Location within Iran
- 29°44′2.508″N 53°12′44.0568″E
- Type: Monument of probable cultic function
- Periods: Achaemenid or post-Achaemenid
- Cultures: Persian
- Location: Kuh-e Rahmat mountain, north of Chasht Khvor village, Arsanjan County, Fars province, Iran

Site notes
- Height: 16.50 metres (54.1 ft)
- Length: 20.30 metres (66.6 ft)
- Width: 13.50 metres (44.3 ft)
- Architectural style: Achaemenid
- Excavation dates: None
- Discovered: 1881
- Condition: Decaying
- Management: Cultural Heritage, Handicrafts and Tourism Organization of Iran
- Public access: yes

Qadamgah (Persian: قدمگاه) or Chasht-Khor (چاشت خور) is an Achaemenid rock-cut monument at the southeastern part of the Kuh-e Rahmat mountain in Fars province of Iran, about 40 km south of Persepolis. It consists of three platforms with rear walls and staircases, and features cavities on the back wall and a now-dry spring and pond at the bottom. Its function has been a matter of debate, with latest research pointing to a religious function related to the holy element water.

== Name ==
Qadamgah, also transliterated as Kadam Gah (Persian: قدمگاه Qadamgāh, Persian pronunciation: [ɢædæmˈgɒːh]), is the modern Persian word for "footprint". Another local name is Qadamgāh-e Ali (قدمگاه علی, literally "the footprint of Ali"). The structure is also called Īvān-e Qadmgāh (ایوان قدمگاه, literally "the iwan of Qadamgah").

Another name is Chāsht-Khār (چاشت خوار or چاشتخوار [tʃɒːʃtˈxɒːɾ]), or Chāsht-Khor (چاشت خور or چاشتخور [tʃɒːʃtˈxoɾ]), which is also the name of the village nearby.

== Early studies ==
External images
- Plan of Qadamgah by Wells (a)
- Plan of Qadamgah by Wells (b)

The monument was first discovered by Capt. H. L. Wells (from the Royal Engineers) in 1881 who published a drawing of the plan and section of it, but did not describe it. The structure and its purpose was later discussed by Forsat-od-Dowleh (1854–1920), Louis Vanden Berghe (1954), Giorgio Gullini (1964), Mohammad Taqi Mostafavi (1964), Calmeyer (1975), Rémy Boucharlat (1979), Kleiss (1993), and Jean-Claude Bessac (2007).

== Description ==
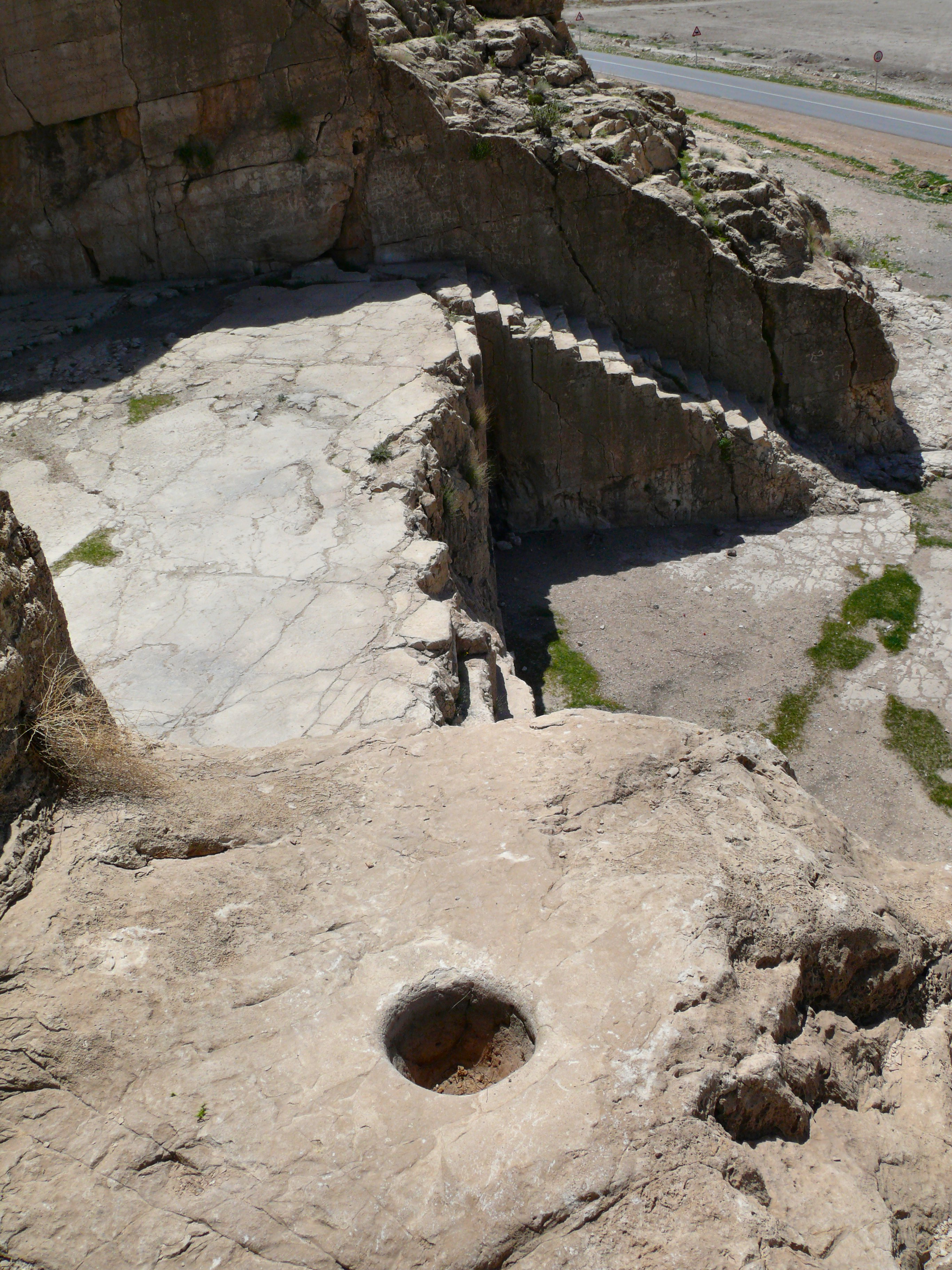
The right-hand staircase and one of the holes (in foreground)

The structure has been built by cutting two deep terraces vertically from the top of the rocky limestone slope, forming three superimposed platforms with vertical rear walls. The monument lacks any built structures. Underneath the lower terrace there has been a now-dry spring feeding a pool which overlooked the monument. The terraces are 13.50 metres (44.3 ft) wide. The lower terrace is 3 metres (9.8 ft) above the ground. The upper terrace, which is 4.25 metres (13.9 ft) higher, is linked to the lower one by two rock-cut staircases on the sides. Three rows of five shallow cavities have been cut in rectangular form into the back wall above the upper terrace. Several shallow, hemispherical holes are also cut along the edge of the upper terrace.

== Purpose ==
The structure dates back to the Achaemenid or post-Achaemenid period. Several hypotheses have been proposed for its function, including an unfinished Royal tomb (it is compared to the two tombs near Persepolis; the construction would have been abandoned like the so-called "unfinished tomb of Darius III" at Persepolis South), a funerary function (with the cavities functioning as a place for bones (astōdān)), or a cultural function. Later observations suggest the work was finished, and the cavities were likely covered with hypothetical stone slabs (which may have contained inscriptions or reliefs for aesthetic purposes). Latest research by Jean-Claude Bessac favors a "cultic function related to water" (Aban) and the presence of the spring and the pool, and dismisses the funerary function. This would make Qadamgah a unique Achaemenid cultic place known to the date. There are also cuneiform clay-tablets in the Persepolis Administrative Archives with possible references to this site.

== Current status ==
The monument is fragile and is slowly decaying. The only published drawing of the plan and section of the monument is that of H. L. Wells. Rémy Boucharlat in Encyclopædia Iranica advises "a complete and careful survey ... and some excavation at its foot".

== See also ==
- Temples of Anahita
- Anahita
- Mithra
- Naqsh-e Rostam
- Pasargadae
