= Raziabad, Damghan =

Village in Semnan province, Iran

Raziabad Persian: رضي آباد
- Village
- Location within Iran
- Coordinates: 36°06′52″N 54°12′43″E
- Country: Iran
- Province: Semnan
- County: Damghan
- District: Amirabad
- Rural District: Qohab-e Sarsar

Population (2016)
  - Total: 150
- Time zone: UTC+3:30 (IRST)

Raziabad (Persian: رضي آباد) (Note: Also romanized as Raẕīābād) is a village in Qohab-e Sarsar Rural District of Amirabad District in Damghan County, Semnan province, Iran.

== Demographics ==
=== Population ===
At the time of the 2006 National Census, the village's population was 45 in 18 households. The following census in 2011 counted 29 people in 13 households. The 2016 census measured the population of the village as 150 people in 52 households.
