= Seydabad, Semnan =

Village in Semnan province, Iran

Seydabad Persian: صيد آباد
- Village
- Location within Iran
- Coordinates: 36°03′13″N 54°08′59″E
- Country: Iran
- Province: Semnan
- County: Damghan
- District: Amirabad
- Rural District: Qohab-e Sarsar

Population (2016)
  - Total: 521
- Time zone: UTC+3:30 (IRST)

Seydabad (Persian: صيد آباد) (Note: Also romanized as Şeydābād) is a village in, and the capital of, Qohab-e Sarsar Rural District in Amirabad District of Damghan County, Semnan province, Iran.

== Demographics ==
=== Population ===
At the time of the 2006 National Census, the village's population was 443 in 148 households. The following census in 2011 counted 448 people in 128 households. The 2016 census measured the population of the village as 521 people in 171 households, the most populous in its rural district.
