= Amravan =

Village in Semnan province, Iran

Amravan Persian: عمروان
- Village
- Location within Iran
- Coordinates: 35°56′38″N 54°09′48″E
- Country: Iran
- Province: Semnan
- County: Damghan
- District: Amirabad
- Rural District: Qohab-e Sarsar

Population (2016)
  - Total: 132
- Time zone: UTC+3:30 (IRST)

Amravan (Persian: عمروان) (Note: Also romanized as Amravān, ‘Amrevān, and Amrevān) is a village in Qohab-e Sarsar Rural District of Amirabad District in Damghan County, Semnan province, Iran.

== Demographics ==
=== Population ===
At the time of the 2006 National Census, the village's population was 141 in 45 households. The following census in 2011 counted 124 people in 41 households. The 2016 census measured the population of the village as 132 people in 51 households.
