= Tabrizak =

Village in Zanjan province, Iran

Tabrizak Persian: تبريزك
- Village
- Location within Iran
- Coordinates: 36°26′36″N 47°53′07″E
- Country: Iran
- Province: Zanjan
- County: Mahneshan
- District: Anguran
- Rural District: Qaleh Juq

Population (2016)
  - Total: 155
- Time zone: UTC+3:30 (IRST)

Tabrizak (Persian: تبريزك) (Note: Also romanized as Tabrīzak) is a village in Qaleh Juq Rural District of Anguran District in Mahneshan County, Zanjan province, Iran.

== Demographics ==
=== Population ===
At the time of the 2006 National Census, the village's population was 271 in 64 households. The following census in 2011 counted 234 people in 74 households. The 2016 census measured the population of the village as 155 people in 57 households.
