= Qarayi, Zanjan =

Village in Zanjan province, Iran

Qarayi Persian: قرآیی
- Village
- Location within Iran
- Coordinates: 36°32′04″N 47°56′47″E
- Country: Iran
- Province: Zanjan
- County: Mahneshan
- District: Anguran
- Rural District: Qaleh Juq

Population (2016)
  - Total: 58
- Time zone: UTC+3:30 (IRST)

Qarayi (Persian: قرآیی) (Note: Also romanized as Qarā’ī; formerly known as Qareh’ī (قره آيي)) is a village in Qaleh Juq Rural District of Anguran District in Mahneshan County, Zanjan province, Iran.

== Demographics ==
=== Population ===
At the time of the 2006 National Census, the village's population was 119 in 22 households. The following census in 2011 counted 102 people in 27 households. The 2016 census measured the population of the village as 58 people in 18 households.
