= Eymir, Zanjan =

Village in Zanjan province, Iran

Eymir Persian: ايمير
- Village
- Location within Iran
- Coordinates: 36°35′43″N 47°46′28″E
- Country: Iran
- Province: Zanjan
- County: Mahneshan
- District: Anguran
- Rural District: Qaleh Juq

Population (2016)
  - Total: 150
- Time zone: UTC+3:30 (IRST)

Eymir (Persian: ايمير) (Note: Also romanized as Eymīr; also known as Eymer (ايمر)) is a village in Qaleh Juq Rural District of Anguran District in Mahneshan County, Zanjan province, Iran.

== Demographics ==
=== Population ===
At the time of the 2006 National Census, the village's population was 143 in 32 households. The following census in 2011 counted 128 people in 36 households. The 2016 census measured the population of the village as 150 people in 47 households.
