= Dowlatabad, Damghan =

Village in Semnan province, Iran

Dowlatabad Persian: دولت آباد
- Village
- Location within Iran
- Coordinates: 36°04′23″N 54°10′50″E
- Country: Iran
- Province: Semnan
- County: Damghan
- District: Amirabad
- Rural District: Qohab-e Sarsar

Population (2016)
  - Total: 121
- Time zone: UTC+3:30 (IRST)

Dowlatabad (Persian: دولت آباد) (Note: Also romanized as Daulatābād and Dowlatābād) is a village in Qohab-e Sarsar Rural District of Amirabad District in Damghan County, Semnan province, Iran.

== Demographics ==
=== Population ===
At the time of the 2006 National Census, the village's population was 54 in 28 households. The following census in 2011 counted 73 people in 28 households. The 2016 census measured the population of the village as 121 people in 49 households.
