= Owchtash =

Village in Zanjan province, Iran

Owchtash Persian: اوچ تاش
- Village
- Location within Iran
- Coordinates: 36°26′00″N 47°41′17″E
- Country: Iran
- Province: Zanjan
- County: Mahneshan
- District: Anguran
- Rural District: Qaleh Juq

Population (2016)
  - Total: 216
- Time zone: UTC+3:30 (IRST)

Owchtash (Persian: اوچ تاش) (Note: Also romanized as Owchţāsh and Ūchtāsh) is a village in Qaleh Juq Rural District of Anguran District in Mahneshan County, Zanjan province, Iran.

== Demographics ==
=== Population ===
At the time of the 2006 National Census, the village's population was 294 in 62 households. The following census in 2011 counted 219 people in 72 households. The 2016 census measured the population of the village as 216 people in 73 households.
