= Duzkand =

Village in Zanjan province, Iran

Duzkand Persian: دوزكند
- Village
- Location within Iran
- Coordinates: 36°30′49″N 47°53′53″E
- Country: Iran
- Province: Zanjan
- County: Mahneshan
- District: Anguran
- Rural District: Qaleh Juq

Population (2016)
  - Total: 556
- Time zone: UTC+3:30 (IRST)

Duzkand (Persian: دوزكند) (Note: Also romanized as Dūzkand) is a village in Qaleh Juq Rural District of Anguran District in Mahneshan County, Zanjan province, Iran.

== Demographics ==
=== Population ===
At the time of the 2006 National Census, the village's population was 725 in 162 households. The following census in 2011 counted 680 people in 213 households. The 2016 census measured the population of the village as 556 people in 187 households. It was the most populous village in its rural district.
