= Javadieh, Shiraz =

Javadieh جواديه
- Village
- Location within Iran
- Coordinates: 29°42′18″N 52°29′29″E
- Country: Iran
- Province: Fars
- County: Shiraz
- Bakhsh: Central
- Rural District: Derak

Population (2006)
  - Total: 6,314
- Time zone: UTC+3:30 (IRST)
  - Summer (DST): UTC+4:30 (IRDT)

Javadieh (Persian: جواديه, also Romanized as Javādīeh) is a village in Derak Rural District, in the Central District of Shiraz County, Fars province, Iran. At the 2006 census, its population was 6,314, living in 1,546 families.
