= Abdolabad, West Azerbaijan =

Abdolabad عبدل اباد
- Village
- Location within Iran
- Coordinates: 38°07′29″N 44°42′24″E
- Country: Iran
- Province: West Azerbaijan
- County: Salmas
- Bakhsh: Central
- Rural District: Zulachay

Population (2006)
  - Total: 138
- Time zone: UTC+3:30 (IRST)
  - Summer (DST): UTC+4:30 (IRDT)

Abdolabad (Persian: عبدل اباد, also Romanized as ‘Abdolābād) is a village in Zulachay Rural District, in the Central District of Salmas County, West Azerbaijan Province, Iran. According to the 2006 census, its population was 138, residing in 32 families.
