= Deh Bid-e Charbiyun =

Deh Bid-e Charbiyun ده بيدچربيون
- Village
- Location within Iran
- Coordinates: 31°15′12″N 50°42′02″E
- Country: Iran
- Province: Kohgiluyeh and Boyer-Ahmad
- County: Boyer-Ahmad
- Bakhsh: Margown
- Rural District: Zilayi

Population (2006)
  - Total: 22
- Time zone: UTC+3:30 (IRST)
  - Summer (DST): UTC+4:30 (IRDT)

Deh Bid-e Charbiyun (Persian: ده بيدچربيون, also Romanized as Deh Bīd-e Charbīyūn; also known as Deh Bīd) is a village in Zilayi Rural District, Margown District, Boyer-Ahmad County, Kohgiluyeh and Boyer-Ahmad Province, Iran. At the 2006 census, its population was 22, in 4 families.
