= Javadieh, Razavi Khorasan =

Javadieh جواديه
- Village
- Location within Iran
- Coordinates: 36°29′44″N 59°27′01″E
- Country: Iran
- Province: Razavi Khorasan
- County: Mashhad
- Bakhsh: Central
- Rural District: Miyan Velayat

Population (2006)
  - Total: 423
- Time zone: UTC+3:30 (IRST)
  - Summer (DST): UTC+4:30 (IRDT)

Javadieh (Persian: جواديه, also Romanized as Javādīeh; also known as Chambar Ghorbāl) is a village in Miyan Velayat Rural District, in the Central District of Mashhad County, Razavi Khorasan Province, Iran. At the 2006 census, its population was 423, in 121 families.
