= Do Kuhak, Shiraz =

Do Kuhak دوكوهك
- Village
- Location within Iran
- Coordinates: 29°47′32″N 52°24′54″E
- Country: Iran
- Province: Fars
- County: Shiraz
- Bakhsh: Central
- Rural District: Derak

Population (2006)
  - Total: 4,453
- Time zone: UTC+3:30 (IRST)
  - Summer (DST): UTC+4:30 (IRDT)

Do Kuhak (Persian: دوكوهك, also Romanized as Do Kūhak, Dow Kūhak, and Dūkūhak; also known as Dūdehak) is a village in Derak Rural District, in the Central District of Shiraz County, Fars province, Iran. At the 2006 census, its population was 4,453, in 1,115 families.
