= Safarabad, Kermanshah =

Village in Kermanshah, Iran

Safarabad صفراباد
- Village
- Location within Iran
- Coordinates: 34°28′48″N 46°44′07″E
- Country: Iran
- Province: Kermanshah
- County: Kermanshah
- Bakhsh: Kuzaran
- Rural District: Sanjabi

Population (2006)
  - Total: 40
- Time zone: UTC+3:30 (IRST)
  - Summer (DST): UTC+4:30 (IRDT)

Safarabad (Persian: صفراباد, also Romanized as Şafarābād) is a village in Sanjabi Rural District, Kuzaran District, Kermanshah County, Kermanshah Province, Iran. At the 2006 census, its population was 40, in 11 families.
