= Qaleh-ye Abdollah Beygi =

Qaleh-ye Abdollah Beygi قلعه عبدالله بیگی
- village
- Location within Iran
- Coordinates: 30°17′45″N 52°04′29″E
- Country: Iran
- Province: Fars
- County: Sepidan
- Bakhsh: Hamaijan
- Rural District: Shesh Pir

Population (2006)
  - Total: 56
- Time zone: UTC+3:30 (IRST)
  - Summer (DST): UTC+4:30 (IRDT)

Qaleh-ye Abdollah Beygi (Persian: قلعه عبدالله بیگی, also Romanized as Qal‘eh-ye 'Abdollah Beygī; also known as 'Abdolābād, Qal‘eh-ye 'Abdollāh, and Qal‘eh-ye 'Abdollāh Beyk) is a village in Shesh Pir Rural District, Hamaijan District, Sepidan County, Fars province, Iran. At the 2006 census, its population was 56, in 17 families.
