= Emam Kandi, Anzal =

Emam Kandi امامكندي
- Village
- Location within Iran
- Coordinates: 37°50′52″N 45°00′41″E
- Country: Iran
- Province: West Azerbaijan
- County: Urmia
- Bakhsh: Anzal
- Rural District: Anzal-e Jonubi

Population (2006)
  - Total: 366
- Time zone: UTC+3:30 (IRST)
  - Summer (DST): UTC+4:30 (IRDT)

Emam Kandi (Persian: امامكندي, also Romanized as Emām Kandī and Emāmkandī) is a village in Anzal-e Jonubi Rural District, Anzal District, Urmia County, West Azerbaijan Province, Iran. At the 2006 census, its population was 366, in 71 families.
