= Emam Kandi, Mahneshan =

Village in Zanjan province, Iran

Emam Kandi Persian: امام كندي
- Village
- Location within Iran
- Coordinates: 36°35′04″N 47°47′00″E
- Country: Iran
- Province: Zanjan
- County: Mahneshan
- District: Anguran
- Rural District: Qaleh Juq

Population (2016)
  - Total: 157
- Time zone: UTC+3:30 (IRST)

Emam Kandi (Persian: امام كندي) (Note: Also romanized as Emām Kandī) is a village in Qaleh Juq Rural District of Anguran District in Mahneshan County, Zanjan province, Iran.

== Demographics ==
=== Population ===
At the time of the 2006 National Census, the village's population was 167 in 40 households. The following census in 2011 counted 157 people in 49 households. The 2016 census measured the population of the village as 157 people in 56 households.
