= Abdolabad, Bardsir =

Abdolabad عبدل‌آباد
- village
- Location within Iran
- Coordinates: 29°31′12″N 56°59′24″E
- Country: Iran
- Province: Kerman
- County: Bardsir
- Bakhsh: Central
- Rural District: Golzar

Population (2006)
  - Total: 28
- Time zone: UTC+3:30 (IRST)
  - Summer (DST): UTC+4:30 (IRDT)

Abdolabad (Persian: عبدل‌آباد, also Romanized as ‘Abdolābād) is a village in Golzar Rural District, in the Central District of Bardsir County, Kerman Province, Iran. At the 2006 census, its population was 28, in 8 families.
