= Zeydabad, Fahraj =

Zeydabad زيداباد
- Village
- Location within Iran
- Coordinates: 28°52′58″N 58°52′04″E
- Country: Iran
- Province: Kerman
- County: Fahraj
- Bakhsh: Central
- Rural District: Borj-e Akram

Population (2006)
  - Total: 489
- Time zone: UTC+3:30 (IRST)
  - Summer (DST): UTC+4:30 (IRDT)

Zeydabad (Persian: زيداباد, also Romanized as Zeydābād and Zeid Abad; also known as Javādīyeh-ye Zeydābād) is a village in Borj-e Akram Rural District, in the Central District of Fahraj County, Kerman Province, Iran. At the 2006 census, its population was 489, in 123 families.
