= Abdollahabad-e Do =

Abdollahabad-e Do عبداله اباد
- village
- Location within Iran
- Coordinates: 29°59′21″N 56°32′03″E
- Country: Iran
- Province: Kerman
- County: Bardsir
- Bakhsh: Central
- Rural District: Mashiz

Population (2006)
  - Total: 154
- Time zone: UTC+3:30 (IRST)
  - Summer (DST): UTC+4:30 (IRDT)

Abdollahabad-e Do (Persian: عبداله اباد2, also Romanized as ‘Abdollāhābād-e Do; also known as ‘Abdollāhābād) is a village in Mashiz Rural District, in the Central District of Bardsir County, Kerman Province, Iran. At the 2006 census, its population was 154, in 33 families.
