= Ziadabad, Sepidan =

Ziadabad زياداباد
- Village
- Location within Iran
- Coordinates: 30°02′21″N 52°24′37″E
- Country: Iran
- Province: Fars
- County: Sepidan
- Bakhsh: Beyza
- Rural District: Beyza

Population (2006)
  - Total: 226
- Time zone: UTC+3:30 (IRST)
  - Summer (DST): UTC+4:30 (IRDT)

Ziadabad (Persian: زياداباد, also Romanized as Zīādābād) is a village in Beyza Rural District, Beyza District, Sepidan County, Fars province, Iran. At the 2006 census, its population was 226, in 54 families.
