= Abdollahabad-e Ojaq =

Abdollahabad-e Ojaq عبداله اباداجاق
- Village
- Location within Iran
- Coordinates: 35°28′23″N 51°22′56″E
- Country: Iran
- Province: Tehran
- County: Rey
- Bakhsh: Kahrizak
- Rural District: Kahrizak

Population (2006)
  - Total: 25
- Time zone: UTC+3:30 (IRST)
  - Summer (DST): UTC+4:30 (IRDT)

Abdollahabad-e Ojaq (Persian: عبداله اباداجاق, also Romanized as ‘Abdollāhābād-e Ojāq; also known as ‘Abdollāhābād-e Reẕā’īyeh) is a village in Kahrizak Rural District, Kahrizak District, Ray County, Tehran Province, Iran. At the 2006 census, its population was 25, in 7 families.
