= Abdollahabad, Hormozgan =

Abdollahabad عبداله آباد
- Village
- Country: Iran
- Province: Hormozgan
- County: Minab
- Bakhsh: Senderk
- Rural District: Senderk

Population (2006)
  - Total: 335
- Time zone: UTC+3:30 (IRST)
  - Summer (DST): UTC+4:30 (IRDT)

Abdollahabad (Persian: عبداله آباد, also Romanized as ʿAbdollahābād) is a village in Senderk Rural District, Senderk District, Minab County, Hormozgan Province, Iran. At the 2006 census, its population was 335, in 65 families.
