= Ebdalabad, Chaharmahal and Bakhtiari =

Ebdalabad ابدال اباد
- Village
- Location within Iran
- Coordinates: 32°25′32″N 50°19′38″E
- Country: Iran
- Province: Chaharmahal and Bakhtiari
- County: Kuhrang
- Bakhsh: Central
- Rural District: Dasht-e Zarrin

Population (2006)
  - Total: 103
- Time zone: UTC+3:30 (IRST)
  - Summer (DST): UTC+4:30 (IRDT)

Ebdalabad (Persian: ابدال اباد, also Romanized as Ebdālābād) is a village in Dasht-e Zarrin Rural District, in the Central District of Kuhrang County, Chaharmahal and Bakhtiari Province, Iran. At the 2006 census, its population was 103, in 17 families.
