= Do Kuhak, Khuzestan =

Do Kuhak دوكوهك
- Village
- Location within Iran
- Coordinates: 31°12′38″N 49°38′48″E
- Country: Iran
- Province: Khuzestan
- County: Ramhormoz
- Bakhsh: Central
- Rural District: Howmeh-ye Sharqi

Population (2006)
  - Total: 464
- Time zone: UTC+3:30 (IRST)
  - Summer (DST): UTC+4:30 (IRDT)

Do Kuhak (Persian: دوكوهك, also Romanized as Do Kūhak, Dokoohak, and Dow Kūhak; also known as Dahkak and Do Kahak) is a village in Howmeh-ye Sharqi Rural District, in the Central District of Ramhormoz County, Khuzestan Province, Iran. At the 2006 census, its population was 464, in 93 families.
