= Abdollahabad, Anbarabad =

Abdollahabad عبداله اباد
- Village
- Location within Iran
- Coordinates: 28°22′36″N 57°52′34″E
- Country: Iran
- Province: Kerman
- County: Anbarabad
- Bakhsh: Central
- Rural District: Jahadabad

Population (2006)
  - Total: 148
- Time zone: UTC+3:30 (IRST)
  - Summer (DST): UTC+4:30 (IRDT)

Abdollahabad (Persian: عبداله اباد, also romanized as ‘Abdollāhābād; also known as ‘Abdollahābād-e Hūmeh and Abdollah Abad Hoomeh) is a village in Jahadabad Rural District, in the Central District of Anbarabad County, Kerman Province, Iran. At the 2006 census, its population was 148, in 34 families.
