= Abdol Deh =

Abdol Deh عبدل ده
- Village
- Location within Iran
- Coordinates: 36°30′43″N 52°08′20″E
- Country: Iran
- Province: Mazandaran
- County: Nur
- Bakhsh: Chamestan
- Rural District: Natel-e Restaq

Population (2006)
  - Total: 464
- Time zone: UTC+3:30 (IRST)
  - Summer (DST): UTC+4:30 (IRDT)

Abdol Deh (Persian: عبدل ده, also Romanized as ‘Abdol Deh; also known as ‘Abdollāhābād, ‘Abdullāhābād, ‘Andal Deh, and Chalusān) is a village in Natel-e Restaq Rural District, Chamestan District, Nur County, Mazandaran Province, Iran. At the 2006 census, its population was 464, in 113 families.
