= Abdollahabad-e Yek =

Abdollahabad-e Yek عبدالله اباد1
- Village
- Location within Iran
- Coordinates: 29°53′28″N 56°32′15″E
- Country: Iran
- Province: Kerman
- County: Bardsir
- Bakhsh: Central
- Rural District: Mashiz

Population (2006)
  - Total: 20
- Time zone: UTC+3:30 (IRST)
  - Summer (DST): UTC+4:30 (IRDT)

Abdollahabad-e Yek (Persian: عبدالله اباد1, also Romanized as ‘Abdollāhābād-e Yek; also known as ‘Abdollāhābād) is a village in Mashiz Rural District, in the Central District of Bardsir County, Kerman Province, Iran. At the 2006 census, its population was 20, in 6 families.
