= Motasemabad =

Motasemabad معتصم آباد
- Village
- Location within Iran
- Coordinates: 34°27′17″N 48°10′39″E
- Country: Iran
- Province: Hamadan
- County: Tuyserkan
- Bakhsh: Qolqol Rud
- Rural District: Miyan Rud

Population (2006)
  - Total: 265
- Time zone: UTC+3:30 (IRST)
  - Summer (DST): UTC+4:30 (IRDT)

Motasemabad (Persian: معتصم آباد, also Romanized as Mo‘taşemābād; also known as Javādīyeh) is a village in Miyan Rud Rural District, Qolqol Rud District, Tuyserkan County, Hamadan Province, Iran. At the 2006 census, its population was 265, in 57 families.
