= Emam Kandi, Sumay-ye Beradust =

Emam Kandi امام كندي
- Village
- Location within Iran
- Coordinates: 37°44′00″N 44°42′00″E
- Country: Iran
- Province: West Azerbaijan
- County: Urmia
- Bakhsh: Sumay-ye Beradust
- Rural District: Beradust

Population (2006)
  - Total: 77
- Time zone: UTC+3:30 (IRST)
  - Summer (DST): UTC+4:30 (IRDT)

Emam Kandi (Persian: امام كندي, also Romanized as Emām Kandī) is a village in Beradust Rural District, Sumay-ye Beradust District, Urmia County, West Azerbaijan Province, Iran. At the 2006 census, its population was 77, in 15 families.
