= Sang Kar, Kerman =

Sang Kar سنگ كر
- Village
- Location within Iran
- Coordinates: 29°21′19″N 56°38′37″E
- Country: Iran
- Province: Kerman
- County: Baft
- Bakhsh: Central
- Rural District: Kiskan

Population (2006)
  - Total: 113
- Time zone: UTC+3:30 (IRST)
  - Summer (DST): UTC+4:30 (IRDT)

Sang Kar (Persian: سنگ كر, also Romanized as Sang Kār and Sang-e Kar; also known as Sangar) is a village in Kiskan Rural District, in the Central District of Baft County, Kerman Province, Iran. At the 2006 census, its population was 113, in 27 families.
