= Abdollahabad, Tonekabon =

Abdollahabad عبدالله‌آباد
- Village
- Location within Iran
- Country: Iran
- Province: Mazandaran
- County: Tonekabon
- Bakhsh: Nashta
- Rural District: Tameshkol

Population (2006)
  - Total: 283
- Time zone: UTC+3:30 (IRST)
  - Summer (DST): UTC+4:30 (IRDT)

Abdollahabad (Persian: عبدالله‌آباد, also Romanized as ʿAbdollahābād) is a village in Tameshkol Rural District, Nashta District, Tonekabon County, Mazandaran Province, Iran. At the 2006 census, its population was 283, in 76 families.
