= Safarabad-e Chin =

Safarabad-e Chin صفرابادچين
- Village
- Location within Iran
- Coordinates: 31°00′21″N 50°54′51″E
- Country: Iran
- Province: Kohgiluyeh and Boyer-Ahmad
- County: Boyer-Ahmad
- Bakhsh: Ludab
- Rural District: Chin

Population (2006)
  - Total: 219
- Time zone: UTC+3:30 (IRST)
  - Summer (DST): UTC+4:30 (IRDT)

Safarabad-e Chin (Persian: صفرابادچين, also Romanized as Şafarābād-e Chīn; also known as Şafarābād and Z̧afarābād) is a village in Chin Rural District, Ludab District, Boyer-Ahmad County, Kohgiluyeh and Boyer-Ahmad Province, Iran. At the 2006 census, its population was 219, in 42 families.
