= Javadiyeh, South Khorasan =

Javadiyeh جواديه
- Village
- Location within Iran
- Coordinates: 33°39′56″N 56°51′21″E
- Country: Iran
- Province: South Khorasan
- County: Tabas
- Bakhsh: Central
- Rural District: Montazeriyeh

Population (2006)
  - Total: 54
- Time zone: UTC+3:30 (IRST)
  - Summer (DST): UTC+4:30 (IRDT)

Javadiyeh (Persian: جواديه, also Romanized as Javādīyeh; also known as Deh-e Kāshmarī) is a village in Montazeriyeh Rural District, in the Central District of Tabas County, South Khorasan Province, Iran. At the 2006 census, its population was 54, in 15 families.
