= Sang Kar (village) =

Sang Kar سنگ کر
- village
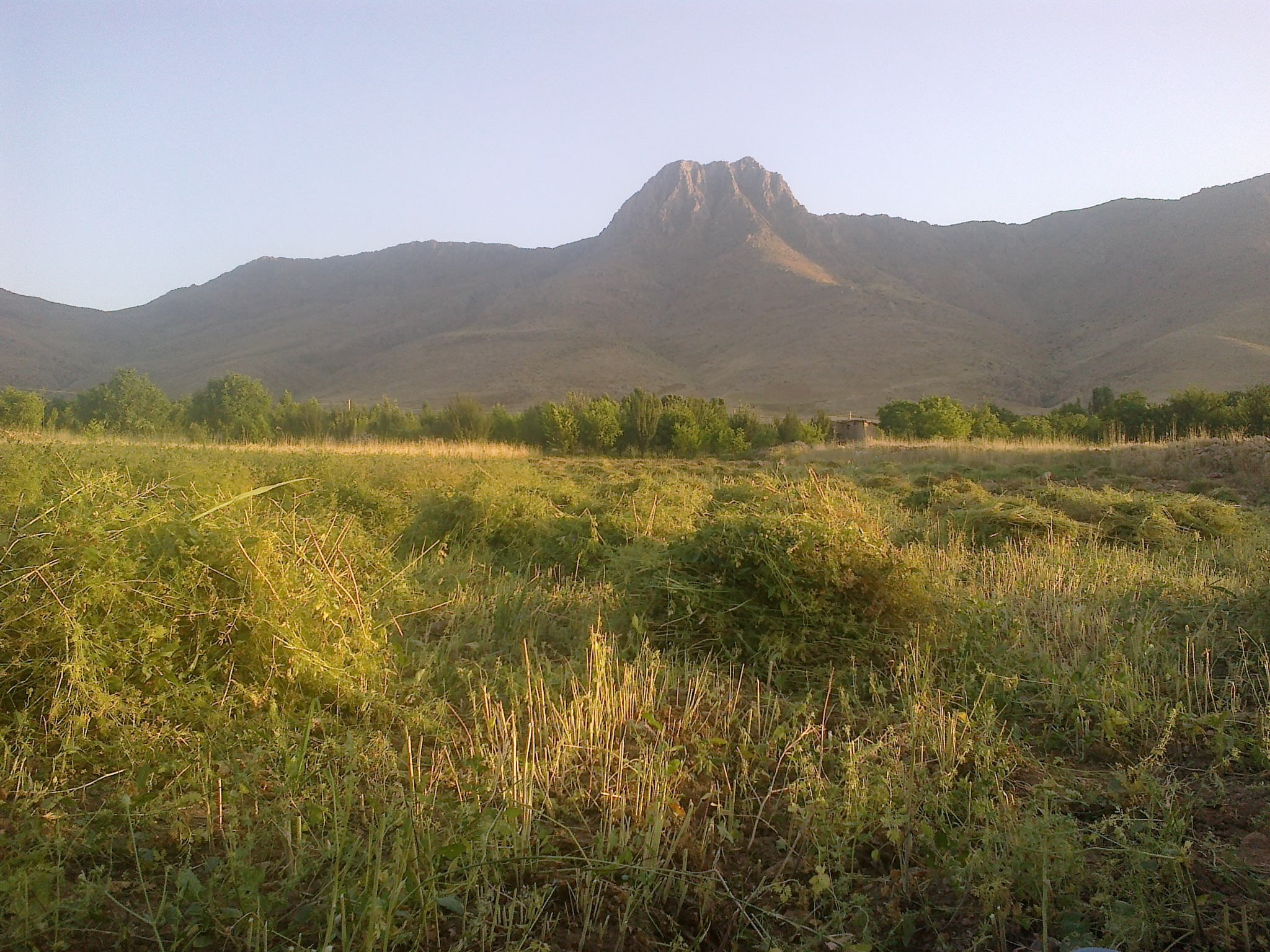

- Location within Iran
- Coordinates: 34°07′09″N 47°49′06″E
- Country: Iran
- Province: Lorestan
- County: Delfan
- Bakhsh: Central
- Rural District: Nurabad

Population (2006)
  - Total: 99
- Time zone: UTC+3:30 (IRST)
  - Summer (DST): UTC+4:30 (IRDT)

Sang Kar (Persian: سنگ کر; also known as Sang Kar-e ‘Olyā, Sang Kar-e Sofl n) is a village in Nurabad Rural District, in the Central District of Delfan County, Lorestan Province, Iran. At the 2006 census, its population was 99, in 21 families.
