= Qarah Darreh, Zanjan =

Village in Zanjan province, Iran

Qarah Darreh Persian: قره دره
- Village
- Location within Iran
- Coordinates: 36°30′29″N 47°43′06″E
- Country: Iran
- Province: Zanjan
- County: Mahneshan
- District: Anguran
- Rural District: Qaleh Juq

Population (2016)
  - Total: 465
- Time zone: UTC+3:30 (IRST)

Qarah Darreh (Persian: قره دره) (Note: Also romanized as Qareh Darreh) is a village in Qaleh Juq Rural District of Anguran District in Mahneshan County, Zanjan province, Iran.

== Demographics ==
=== Population ===
At the time of the 2006 National Census, the village's population was 463 in 96 households. The following census in 2011 counted 450 people in 130 households. The 2016 census measured the population of the village as 465 people in 134 households.
