= Emam Kandi, Khoy =

Emam Kandi امامكندي
- Village
- Location within Iran
- Coordinates: 38°28′25″N 44°56′30″E
- Country: Iran
- Province: West Azerbaijan
- County: Khoy
- Bakhsh: Central
- Rural District: Rahal

Population (2006)
  - Total: 240
- Time zone: UTC+3:30 (IRST)
  - Summer (DST): UTC+4:30 (IRDT)

Emam Kandi (Persian: امامكندي, also Romanized as Emām Kandī) is a village in Rahal Rural District, in the Central District of Khoy County, West Azerbaijan Province, Iran. At the 2006 census, its population was 240, in 64 families.
