= Safarabad, Ardabil =

Safarabad
- Village
- Location in Iran
- Coordinates: 38°59′20″N 47°29′27″E
- Country: Iran
- Province: Ardabil Province
- Time zone: UTC+3:30 (IRST)
  - Summer (DST): UTC+4:30 (IRDT)

Safarabad is a village in the Ardabil Province of Iran.
