= Abdollahabad, Bardsir =

Abdollahabad عبدالله اباد
- Village
- Location within Iran
- Coordinates: 29.928°N 56.574°E
- Country: Iran
- Province: Kerman
- County: Bardsir
- Bakhsh: Central
- Rural District: Negar

Population (2006)
  - Total: 27
- Time zone: UTC+3:30 (IRST)
  - Summer (DST): UTC+4:30 (IRDT)

Abdollahabad (Persian: عبدالله اباد, also Romanized as ʿAbdolllahābād) is a village in Negar Rural District, in the Central District of Bardsir County, Kerman Province, Iran. At the 2006 census, its population was 27, in 5 families.
