= Abdolabad, Zarand =

Abdolabad عبدل‌آباد
- village
- Location within Iran
- Coordinates: 30°36′38″N 56°23′16″E
- Country: Iran
- Province: Kerman
- County: Zarand
- Bakhsh: Central
- Rural District: Jorjafak

Population (2006)
  - Total: 95
- Time zone: UTC+3:30 (IRST)
  - Summer (DST): UTC+4:30 (IRDT)

Abdolabad (Persian: عبدل‌آباد, also Romanized as ‘Abdolābād; also known as ‘Abdolābād-e Bādīz and Abdol Abad Siloo’eyeh) is a village in Jorjafak Rural District, in the Central District of Zarand County, Kerman Province, Iran. At the 2006 census, its population was 95, in 36 families.
