= Abdolabad, Hamadan =

Abdolabad Persian: عبدل‌آباد
- village
- Location within Iran
- Coordinates: 35°27′53″N 48°27′52″E
- Country: Iran
- Province: Hamadan
- County: Kabudarahang
- Bakhsh: Shirin Su
- Rural District: Shirin Su

Population (2006)
  - Total: 435
- Time zone: UTC+3:30 (IRST)
  - Summer (DST): UTC+4:30 (IRDT)

Abdolabad (Persian: عبدل‌آباد, also Romanized as ‘Abdolābād; also known as ‘Abdollāhābād and ‘Abdulābād) is a village in Shirin Su Rural District, Shirin Su District, Kabudarahang County, Hamadan Province, Iran. At the 2006 census, its population was 435, in 87 families.
