= Abdollahabad, Zarand =

Abdollahabad عبدالله‌آباد
- village
- Location within Iran
- Coordinates: 30°43′58″N 56°37′44″E
- Country: Iran
- Province: Kerman
- County: Zarand
- Bakhsh: Central
- Rural District: Vahdat

Population (2006)
  - Total: 336
- Time zone: UTC+3:30 (IRST)
  - Summer (DST): UTC+4:30 (IRDT)

Abdollahabad (Persian: عبدالله‌آباد, also Romanized as ‘Abdollāhābād; also known as ‘Abdolābād) is a village in Vahdat Rural District, in the Central District of Zarand County, Kerman Province, Iran. At the 2006 census, its population was 336, in 85 families.
