= Abdollahabad, Garmkhan =

Abdollahabad عبدالله‌آباد
- village
- Location within Iran
- Coordinates: 37°34′47″N 57°23′46″E
- Country: Iran
- Province: North Khorasan
- County: Bojnord
- Bakhsh: Garmkhan
- Rural District: Garmkhan

Population (2006)
  - Total: 605
- Time zone: UTC+3:30 (IRST)
  - Summer (DST): UTC+4:30 (IRDT)

Abdollahabad (Persian: عبدالله‌آباد, also Romanized as ‘Abdollāhābād; also known as ‘Abdolābād and ‘Abdulābād) is a village in Garmkhan Rural District, Garmkhan District, Bojnord County, North Khorasan Province, Iran. At the 2006 census, its population was 605, in 144 families.
