= Abdollahabad, Rafsanjan =

Abdollahabad عبدالله‌آباد
- village
- Location within Iran
- Coordinates: 30°21′55″N 56°04′11″E
- Country: Iran
- Province: Kerman
- County: Rafsanjan
- Bakhsh: Central
- Rural District: Kabutar Khan

Population (2006)
  - Total: 1,614
- Time zone: UTC+3:30 (IRST)
  - Summer (DST): UTC+4:30 (IRDT)

Abdollahabad (Persian: عبدالله‌آباد, also Romanized as ‘Abdollāhābād; also known as ‘Abdolābād and ‘Abdullāhābād) is a village in Kabutar Khan Rural District, in the Central District of Rafsanjan County, Kerman Province, Iran. At the 2006 census, its population was 1,614, in 368 families.
