= Abdollahabad, Firuzeh =

Abdollahabad عبدالله‌آباد
- Village
- Location within Iran
- Coordinates: 36°14′31″N 58°36′19″E
- Country: Iran
- Province: Razavi Khorasan
- County: Firuzeh
- Bakhsh: Central
- Rural District: Takht-e Jolgeh

Population (2006)
  - Total: 20
- Time zone: UTC+3:30 (IRST)
  - Summer (DST): UTC+4:30 (IRDT)

Abdollahabad (Persian: عبدالله‌آباد, also Romanized as ‘Abdollahābād; also known as ‘Abdolābād) is a village in Takht-e Jolgeh Rural District, in the Central District of Firuzeh County, Razavi Khorasan Province, Iran. At the 2006 census, its population was 20, in 6 families.

== See also ==
- List of cities, towns and villages in Razavi Khorasan Province
