= Abdollahabad, Amirabad =

Village in Semnan province, Iran

Abdollahabad Persian: عبداله آباد
- Village
- Location within Iran
- Coordinates: 35°56′41″N 54°11′16″E
- Country: Iran
- Province: Semnan
- County: Damghan
- District: Amirabad
- Rural District: Qohab-e Sarsar

Population (2016)
  - Total: 408
- Time zone: UTC+3:30 (IRST)

Abdollahabad (Persian: عبداله آباد) (Note: Also romanized as ‘Abdollāhābād; also known as ‘Abdolābād) is a village in Qohab-e Sarsar Rural District of Amirabad District in Damghan County, Semnan province, Iran.

== Demographics ==
=== Population ===
At the time of the 2006 National Census, the village's population was 252 in 78 households. The following census in 2011 counted 240 people in 91 households. The 2016 census measured the population of the village as 408 people in 145 households.
