= Abdollahabad, Rudbar-e Jonubi =

Abdollahabad عبدالله‌آباد
- village
- Location within Iran
- Coordinates: 28°03′44″N 57°56′32″E
- Country: Iran
- Province: Kerman
- County: Rudbar-e Jonubi
- Bakhsh: Central
- Rural District: Rudbar

Population (2006)
  - Total: 637
- Time zone: UTC+3:30 (IRST)
  - Summer (DST): UTC+4:30 (IRDT)

Abdollahabad (Persian: عبدالله‌آباد, also Romanized as Abdollāhābād; also known as ‘Abdolābād) is a village in Rudbar Rural District, in the Central District of Rudbar-e Jonubi County, Kerman Province, Iran. At the 2006 census, its population was 637, in 125 families.
