= Abdollahabad, East Azerbaijan =

Abdollahabad عبدالله‌آباد
- village
- Location within Iran
- Coordinates: 37°52′10″N 47°44′44″E
- Country: Iran
- Province: East Azerbaijan
- County: Sarab
- Bakhsh: Central
- Rural District: Molla Yaqub

Population (2006)
  - Total: 78
- Time zone: UTC+3:30 (IRST)
  - Summer (DST): UTC+4:30 (IRDT)

Abdollahabad (Persian: عبدالله‌آباد, also Romanized as ‘Abdollāhābād; also known as ‘Abdolābād) is a village in Molla Yaqub Rural District, in the Central District of Sarab County, East Azerbaijan Province, Iran. At the 2006 census, its population was 78, in 16 families.
