= Abdalabad, Razavi Khorasan =

Village in Razavi Khorasan province, Iran

Abdalabad Persian: ابدال اباد
- Village
- Location within Iran
- Coordinates: 35°23′05″N 60°13′55″E
- Country: Iran
- Province: Razavi Khorasan
- County: Torbat-e Jam
- District: Nasrabad
- Rural District: Bala Jam

Population (2016)
  - Total: 2,296
- Time zone: UTC+3:30 (IRST)

Abdalabad (Persian: ابدال اباد) (Note: Also romanized as Abdālābād; also known as ‘Abdolābād and Adullāhābād) is a village in Bala Jam Rural District of Nasrabad District in Torbat-e Jam County, Razavi Khorasan province, Iran.

== Demographics ==
=== Population ===
At the time of the 2006 National Census, the village's population was 2,192 in 505 households. The following census in 2011 counted 2,392 people in 641 households. The 2016 census measured the population of the village as 2,296 people in 673 households. It was the most populous village in its rural district.
