= Shurab Rural District (Arsanjan County) =

Rural district in Fars province, Iran

Shurab Rural District Persian: دهستان شورآب
- Rural District
- Location within Iran
- Coordinates: 29°42′52″N 53°17′17″E
- Country: Iran
- Province: Fars
- County: Arsanjan
- District: Central
- Capital: Shurab

Population (2016)
  - Total: 9,187
- Time zone: UTC+3:30 (IRST)

Shurab Rural District (Persian: دهستان شورآب) is in the Central District of Arsanjan County, Fars province, Iran. Its capital is the village of Shurab.

== Demographics ==
=== Population ===
At the time of the 2006 National Census, the rural district's population was 8,279 in 1,829 households. There were 8,426 inhabitants in 2,315 households at the following census of 2011. The 2016 census measured the population of the rural district as 9,187 in 2,824 households. The most populous of its 29 villages was Shurab, with 1,325 people.
