= Khobriz Rural District =

Rural district in Fars province, Iran

Khobriz Rural District Persian: دهستان خبريز
- Rural District
- Location within Iran
- Coordinates: 29°47′14″N 53°12′52″E
- Country: Iran
- Province: Fars
- County: Arsanjan
- District: Central
- Capital: Khobriz

Population (2016)
  - Total: 7,065
- Time zone: UTC+3:30 (IRST)

Khobriz Rural District (Persian: دهستان خبريز) is in the Central District of Arsanjan County, Fars province, Iran. Its capital is the village of Khobriz.

== Demographics ==
=== Population ===
At the time of the 2006 National Census, the rural district's population was 6,338 in 1,479 households. There were 6,727 inhabitants in 1,792 households at the following census of 2011. The 2016 census measured the population of the rural district as 7,065 in 2,093 households. The most populous of its 31 villages was Khobriz, with 1,733 people.
