= Aliabad-e Malek Rural District =

Rural district in Fars province, Iran

Aliabad-e Malek Rural District Persian: دهستان علی‌آباد ملک
- Rural District
- Location within Iran
- Coordinates: 29°51′59″N 53°26′18″E
- Country: Iran
- Province: Fars
- County: Arsanjan
- District: Central
- Capital: Aliabad-e Malek

Population (2016)
  - Total: 8,761
- Time zone: UTC+3:30 (IRST)

Aliabad-e Malek Rural District (Persian: دهستان علی‌آباد ملک), (Note: Formerly Arsanjan Rural District (دهستان ارسنجان)) is in the Central District of Arsanjan County, Fars province, Iran. Its capital is the village of Aliabad-e Malek.

== Demographics ==
=== Population ===
At the time of the 2006 National Census, the rural district's population was 8,657 in 2,095 households. There were 8,762 inhabitants in 2,408 households at the following census of 2011. The 2016 census measured the population of the rural district as 8,761 in 2,675 households. The most populous of its 88 villages was Aliabad-e Malek, with 1,877 people.
