= Central District (Arsanjan County) =

District in Fars province, Iran

Central District (Arsanjan County) Persian: بخش مرکزی شهرستان ارسنجان
- District
- Location within Iran
- Coordinates: 29°52′00″N 53°27′30″E
- Country: Iran
- Province: Fars
- County: Arsanjan
- Capital: Arsanjan

Population (2016)
  - Total: 42,719
- Time zone: UTC+3:30 (IRST)

The Central District of Arsanjan County (Persian: بخش مرکزی شهرستان ارسنجان) is in Fars province, Iran. Its capital is the city of Arsanjan.

== Demographics ==
=== Population ===
At the time of the 2006 National Census, the district's population was 40,916 in 9,800 households. The following census in 2011 counted 41,297 people in 11,189 households. The 2016 census measured the population of the district as 42,719 inhabitants in 12,876 households.

=== Administrative divisions ===
Central District (Arsanjan County) Population
Administrative Divisions	2006	2011	2016
Aliabad-e Malek RD (Note: Formerly Arsanjan Rural District)	8,657	8,762	8,761
Khobriz RD	6,338	6,727	7,065
Shurab RD	8,279	8,426	9,187
Arsanjan (city)	17,642	17,382	17,706
Total	40,916	41,297	42,719
RD = Rural District
