= Arsanjan County =

County in Fars province, Iran

Arsanjan County Persian: شهرستان ارسنجان
- County
- Location of Arsanjan County in Fars province (center, green)

- Location of Fars province in Iran
- Coordinates: 29°52′00″N 53°27′30″E
- Country: Iran
- Province: Fars
- Capital: Arsanjan
- Districts: Central

Population (2016)
  - Total: 42,725
- Time zone: UTC+3:30 (IRST)

Arsanjan County (Persian: شهرستان ارسنجان) is in Fars province, Iran. Its capital is the city of Arsanjan.

== Demographics ==
=== Population ===
At the time of the 2006 National Census, the county's population was 40,916 in 9,800 households. The following census in 2011 counted 41,476 people in 11,221 households. The 2016 census measured the population of the county as 42,725 in 12,878 households.

=== Administrative divisions ===
Arsanjan County's population history and administrative structure over three consecutive censuses are shown in the following table.

Arsanjan County Population
Administrative Divisions	2006	2011	2016
Central District	40,916	41,297	42,719
Aliabad-e Malek RD (Note: Formerly Arsanjan Rural District)	8,657	8,762	8,761
Khobriz RD	6,338	6,727	7,065
Shurab RD	8,279	8,426	9,187
Arsanjan (city)	17,642	17,382	17,706
Total	40,916	41,476	42,725
RD = Rural District

== See also ==
- Qadamgah (ancient site)

Media related to Arsanjan County at Wikimedia Commons
