= Ardis =

Ardis may refer to:

- Ardis (given name)
- Ardis, Ottoman Empire
- Ardis (retailer), a supermarket chain in Algiers, Algeria
- Ardis Furnace, an abandoned experimental blast furnace in Michigan
- Ardis Publishing, a Russian-English publishing company
- Advanced Radio Data Information Services (ARDIS), a wireless data network
- ARDIS (All-Road Drive Intelligent System), brand name for all-wheel drive system on Jaecoo vehicles
- Ardiz-e Olya or Ardīs, Iran

== People with the surname ==
- Jim Ardis, mayor of Peoria, Illinois
