= Shirinak, Kerman =

Village in Kerman province, Iran

Shirinak Persian: شیرینک
- Village
- Location within Iran
- Coordinates: 29°31′31″N 57°00′45″E
- Country: Iran
- Province: Kerman
- County: Bardsir
- District: Golzar
- Rural District: Shirinak

Population (2016)
  - Total: 857
- Time zone: UTC+3:30 (IRST)

Shirinak (Persian: شیرینک) (Note: Also romanized as Shīrīnak; also known as Shirinag (شيرينگ), also romanized as Shīrīnag) is a village in, and the capital of, Shirinak Rural District of Golzar District, Bardsir County, Kerman province, Iran.

== Demographics ==
=== Population ===
At the time of the 2006 National Census, the village's population was 789 in 176 households, when it was in Golzar Rural District of the Central District. The following census in 2011 counted 576 people in 168 households, by which time the rural district had been separated from the district in the formation of Golzar District. Shirinak village was transferred to Shirinak Rural District created in the district. The 2016 census measured the population of the village as 857 people in 263 households. It was the most populous village in its rural district.
