= Lalehzar =

Lalehzar (Persian: لاله‌زار) may refer to:

- Lalehzar District, in Kerman Province
- Lalehzar Rural District, in Kerman Province
- Lalehzar, city
- Mount Lalehzar, Kerman Province

== See also ==
- Laleh Zar, village in Ilam Province, Iran
