= Bab Zeytun =

Bab Zeytun باب زيتون
- Village
- Location within Iran
- Coordinates: 29°38′14″N 56°30′48″E
- Country: Iran
- Province: Kerman
- County: Bardsir
- Bakhsh: Central
- Rural District: Mashiz

Population (2006)
  - Total: 772
- Time zone: UTC+3:30 (IRST)
  - Summer (DST): UTC+4:30 (IRDT)

Bab Zeytun (Persian: باب زيتون, also Romanized as Bāb Zeytūn and Bāb-e Zeytūn; also known as Bāb Zeytūn-e Bīd Khān) is a village in Mashiz Rural District, in the Central District of Bardsir County, Kerman Province, Iran. At the 2006 census, its population was 772, in 187 families.
