= Shirinak Rural District =

Rural district in Kerman province, Iran

Shirinak Rural District Persian: دهستان شیرینک
- Rural District
- Location within Iran
- Coordinates: 29°30′30″N 57°08′48″E
- Country: Iran
- Province: Kerman
- County: Bardsir
- District: Golzar
- Capital: Shirinak

Population (2016)
  - Total: 2,149
- Time zone: UTC+3:30 (IRST)

Shirinak Rural District (Persian: دهستان شیرینک) is in Golzar District of Bardsir County, Kerman province, Iran. Its capital is the village of Shirinak.

== History ==
After the 2006 National Census, Golzar Rural District, (Note: Formerly Qaryah ol Arab Rural District) and later the city of Golzar, (Note: Formerly the village of Qaryah ol Arab) were separated from the Central District in the formation of Golzar District, which was divided into two rural districts, including the new Shirinak Rural District.

== Demographics ==
=== Population ===
At the time of the 2011 census, the rural district's population was 1,636 in 430 households. The 2016 census measured the population of the rural district as 2,149 in 641 households. The most populous of its 30 villages was Shirinak, with 857 people.
