= Farrokh Dasht =

Farrokh Dasht فرخ دشت
- Village
- Location within Iran
- Coordinates: 29°51′36″N 56°37′01″E
- Country: Iran
- Province: Kerman
- County: Bardsir
- Bakhsh: Central
- Rural District: Mashiz

Population (2006)
  - Total: 14
- Time zone: UTC+3:30 (IRST)
  - Summer (DST): UTC+4:30 (IRDT)

Farrokh Dasht (Persian: فرخ دشت; also known as Meshkīnābād) is a village in Mashiz Rural District, in the Central District of Bardsir County, Kerman Province, Iran. At the 2006 census, its population was 14, in 4 families.
