= Jujeng =

Jujeng جوجنگ
- Village
- Location within Iran
- Coordinates: 29°31′32″N 56°39′51″E
- Country: Iran
- Province: Kerman
- County: Bardsir
- Bakhsh: Lalehzar
- Rural District: Qaleh Asgar

Population (2006)
  - Total: 121
- Time zone: UTC+3:30 (IRST)
  - Summer (DST): UTC+4:30 (IRDT)

Jujeng (Persian: جوجنگ, also Romanized as Jūjeng) is a village in Qaleh Asgar Rural District, Lalehzar District, Bardsir County, Kerman Province, Iran. At the 2006 census, its population was 121, in 30 families.
