= Bagh-e Hajji =

Bagh-e Hajji باغ حاجي
- Village
- Location within Iran
- Coordinates: 29°29′46″N 56°41′10″E
- Country: Iran
- Province: Kerman
- County: Bardsir
- Bakhsh: Lalehzar
- Rural District: Qaleh Asgar

Population (2006)
  - Total: 203
- Time zone: UTC+3:30 (IRST)
  - Summer (DST): UTC+4:30 (IRDT)

Bagh-e Hajji (Persian: باغ حاجي, also Romanized as Bāgh-e Ḩājjī and Bāgh Ḩājī) is a village in Qaleh Asgar Rural District, Lalehzar District, Bardsir County, Kerman Province, Iran. At the 2006 census, its population was 203, in 47 families.
