= Deh-e Tavakkol =

Deh-e Tavakkol ده توكل
- Village
- Location within Iran
- Coordinates: 29°28′37″N 56°37′36″E
- Country: Iran
- Province: Kerman
- County: Bardsir
- Bakhsh: Lalehzar
- Rural District: Qaleh Asgar

Population (2006)
  - Total: 45
- Time zone: UTC+3:30 (IRST)
  - Summer (DST): UTC+4:30 (IRDT)

Deh-e Tavakkol (Persian: ده توكل, also Romanized as Dehtavakkol) is a village in Qaleh Asgar Rural District, Lalehzar District, Bardsir County, Kerman Province, Iran. At the 2006 census, its population was 45, in 9 families.
