= Madim-e Olya =

Madim-e Olya مديم عليا
- Village
- Location within Iran
- Coordinates: 29°34′08″N 56°35′30″E
- Country: Iran
- Province: Kerman
- County: Bardsir
- Bakhsh: Lalehzar
- Rural District: Qaleh Asgar

Population (2006)
  - Total: 88
- Time zone: UTC+3:30 (IRST)
  - Summer (DST): UTC+4:30 (IRDT)

Madim-e Olya (Persian: مديم عليا, also Romanized as Madīm-e ‘Olyā; also known as Madīm, and Madīn) is a village in Qaleh Asgar Rural District, Lalehzar District, Bardsir County, Kerman Province, Iran. At the 2006 census, its population was 88, in 27 families.
