= Sahebabad, Bardsir =

Village in Kerman province, Iran

Sahebabad Persian: صاحب اباد
- Village
- Location within Iran
- Coordinates: 29°36′58″N 57°12′42″E
- Country: Iran
- Province: Kerman
- County: Bardsir
- District: Golzar
- Rural District: Golzar

Population (2016)
  - Total: 227
- Time zone: UTC+3:30 (IRST)

Sahebabad (Persian: صاحب اباد) (Note: Also romanized as Şāḩebābād; also known as Sāhibābād) is a village in Golzar Rural District (Note: Formerly Qaryah ol Arab Rural District) of Golzar District, Bardsir County, Kerman province, Iran.

== Demographics ==
=== Population ===
At the time of the 2006 National Census, the village's population was 282 in 66 households, when it was in the Central District. The following census in 2011 counted 396 people in 128 households, by which time the rural district had been separated from the district in the formation of Golzar District. The 2016 census measured the population of the village as 227 people in 71 households. It was the most populous village in its rural district.
