= Bagh-e Esfahanuiyeh =

Bagh-e Esfahanuiyeh باغ اصفهانوئيه
- Village
- Location within Iran
- Coordinates: 29°37′02″N 57°15′01″E
- Country: Iran
- Province: Kerman
- County: Bardsir
- Bakhsh: Central
- Rural District: Golzar

Population (2006)
  - Total: 110
- Time zone: UTC+3:30 (IRST)
  - Summer (DST): UTC+4:30 (IRDT)

Bagh-e Esfahanuiyeh (Persian: باغ اصفهانوئيه, also Romanized as Bāgh-e Eṣfahānū’īyeh; also known as Eṣfehānūueeyeh) is a village in Golzar Rural District, in the Central District of Bardsir County, Kerman Province, Iran. At the 2006 census, its population was 110, in 21 families.
