= Madun =

Madun مادون
- Village
- Location within Iran
- Coordinates: 29°33′01″N 56°36′05″E
- Country: Iran
- Province: Kerman
- County: Bardsir
- Bakhsh: Lalehzar
- Rural District: Qaleh Asgar

Population (2006)
  - Total: 85
- Time zone: UTC+3:30 (IRST)
  - Summer (DST): UTC+4:30 (IRDT)

Madun (Persian: مادون, also Romanized as Mādūn and Mādoon; also known as Mādūn-e Gowd Bāgh) is a village in Qaleh Asgar Rural District, Lalehzar District, Bardsir County, Kerman Province, Iran. At the 2006 census, its population was 85, in 31 families.
