= Farkan, Kerman =

Farkan فركان
- Village
- Location within Iran
- Coordinates: 29°30′37″N 56°40′02″E
- Country: Iran
- Province: Kerman
- County: Bardsir
- Bakhsh: Lalehzar
- Rural District: Qaleh Asgar

Population (2006)
  - Total: 96
- Time zone: UTC+3:30 (IRST)
  - Summer (DST): UTC+4:30 (IRDT)

Farkan (Persian: فركان, also Romanized as Farkān; also known as Parkān) is a village in Qaleh Asgar Rural District, Lalehzar District, Bardsir County, Kerman Province, Iran. At the 2006 census, its population was 96, in 22 families.
