= Deh Nazri =

Deh Nazri ده نذري
- Village
- Location within Iran
- Coordinates: 29°32′45″N 56°40′53″E
- Country: Iran
- Province: Kerman
- County: Bardsir
- Bakhsh: Lalehzar
- Rural District: Qaleh Asgar

Population (2006)
  - Total: 79
- Time zone: UTC+3:30 (IRST)
  - Summer (DST): UTC+4:30 (IRDT)

Deh Nazri (Persian: ده نذري, also Romanized as Deh Naz̄rī and Deh-e Naz̄rī; also known as Deh-e Nadrī and Naz̄rī) is a village in Qaleh Asgar Rural District, Lalehzar District, Bardsir County, Kerman Province, Iran. At the 2006 census, its population was 79, in 18 families.
