= Samanjerd =

Samanjerd سامانجرد
- Village
- Location within Iran
- Coordinates: 29°45′07″N 56°43′29″E
- Country: Iran
- Province: Kerman
- County: Bardsir
- Bakhsh: Central
- Rural District: Mashiz

Population (2006)
  - Total: 216
- Time zone: UTC+3:30 (IRST)
  - Summer (DST): UTC+4:30 (IRDT)

Samanjerd (Persian: سامانجرد, also Romanized as Sāmānjerd and Sāmān-e Jerd) is a village in Mashiz Rural District, in the Central District of Bardsir County, Kerman Province, Iran. At the 2006 census, its population was 216, in 41 families.
