= Sagherchuiyeh =

Village in Kerman, Iran

Sagherchuiyeh سغرچوئيه
- Village
- Country: Iran
- Province: Kerman
- County: Bardsir
- Bakhsh: Lalehzar
- Rural District: Qaleh Asgar

Population (2006)
  - Total: 22
- Time zone: UTC+3:30 (IRST)
  - Summer (DST): UTC+4:30 (IRDT)

Sagherchuiyeh (Persian: سغرچوئيه, also Romanized as Sagherchū’īyeh) is a village in Qaleh Asgar Rural District, Lalehzar District, Bardsir County, Kerman Province, Iran. At the 2006 census, its population was 22, in 8 families.
