= Bab-e Shamil =

Bab-e Shamil باب شميل
- Village
- Location within Iran
- Coordinates: 29°29′43″N 57°08′28″E
- Country: Iran
- Province: Kerman
- County: Bardsir
- Bakhsh: Central
- Rural District: Golzar

Population (2006)
  - Total: 205
- Time zone: UTC+3:30 (IRST)
  - Summer (DST): UTC+4:30 (IRDT)

Bab-e Shamil (Persian: باب شميل, also Romanized as Bāb-e Shamīl, Bāb-i-Shamīl, and Bāb Shamīl; also known as Bāb-i-Shamī) is a village in Golzar Rural District, in the Central District of Bardsir County, Kerman Province, Iran. At the 2006 census, its population was 205, in 47 families.
