= Sang-e Sayyad =

Sang-e Sayyad سنگ صياد
- Village
- Location within Iran
- Coordinates: 29°39′55″N 56°46′15″E
- Country: Iran
- Province: Kerman
- County: Bardsir
- Bakhsh: Lalehzar
- Rural District: Qaleh Asgar

Population (2006)
  - Total: 21
- Time zone: UTC+3:30 (IRST)
  - Summer (DST): UTC+4:30 (IRDT)

Sang-e Sayyad (Persian: سنگ صياد, also Romanized as Sang-e Şayyād) is a village in Qaleh Asgar Rural District, Lalehzar District, Bardsir County, Kerman Province, Iran. At the 2006 census, its population was 21, in 8 families.
