= Sarmolk =

Sarmolk سرملك
- Village
- Location within Iran
- Coordinates: 29°58′17″N 56°33′30″E
- Country: Iran
- Province: Kerman
- County: Bardsir
- Bakhsh: Central
- Rural District: Mashiz

Population (2006)
  - Total: 340
- Time zone: UTC+3:30 (IRST)
  - Summer (DST): UTC+4:30 (IRDT)

Sarmolk (Persian: سرملك; also known as Sar-e Malek and Sar-i-Malīk) is a village in Mashiz Rural District, in the Central District of Bardsir County, Kerman Province, Iran. At the 2006 census, its population was 340, in 86 families.
