= Hararan =

Hararan هراران
- Village
- Location within Iran
- Coordinates: 29°29′00″N 56°42′26″E
- Country: Iran
- Province: Kerman
- County: Bardsir
- Bakhsh: Lalehzar
- Rural District: Qaleh Asgar

Population (2006)
  - Total: 572
- Time zone: UTC+3:30 (IRST)
  - Summer (DST): UTC+4:30 (IRDT)

Hararan (Persian: هراران, also Romanized as Harārān) is a village in Qaleh Asgar Rural District, Lalehzar District, Bardsir County, Kerman Province, Iran. At the 2006 census, its population was 572, in 120 families.
