= Khaleseh Divani =

Khaleseh Divani خالصه ديواني
- Village
- Location within Iran
- Coordinates: 29°40′51″N 57°02′17″E
- Country: Iran
- Province: Kerman
- County: Bardsir
- Bakhsh: Central
- Rural District: Golzar

Population (2006)
  - Total: 39
- Time zone: UTC+3:30 (IRST)
  - Summer (DST): UTC+4:30 (IRDT)

Khaleseh Divani (Persian: خالصه ديواني, also Romanized as Khāleşeh Dīvānī and Khāleseh-Ye-Dīvānī) is a village in Golzar Rural District, in the Central District of Bardsir County, Kerman Province, Iran. At the 2006 census, its population was 39, in 9 families.
