= Abgarm, Bardsir =

Abgarm ابگرم
- Village
- Location within Iran
- Coordinates: 29°35′23″N 56°38′46″E
- Country: Iran
- Province: Kerman
- County: Bardsir
- Bakhsh: Lalehzar
- Rural District: Qaleh Asgar

Population (2006)
  - Total: 20
- Time zone: UTC+3:30 (IRST)
  - Summer (DST): UTC+4:30 (IRDT)

Abgarm (Persian: ابگرم, also Romanized as Ābgarm) is a village in Qaleh Asgar Rural District, Lalehzar District, Bardsir County, Kerman Province, Iran. At the 2006 census, its population was 20, in 6 families.

These results can not be fully credited because of their old age.
