= Cheshmeh Sabz-e Sofla =

Village in Kerman, Iran

Cheshmeh Sabz-e Sofla چشمه سبزسفلي
- Village
- Location within Iran
- Coordinates: 29°53′35″N 56°07′58″E
- Country: Iran
- Province: Kerman
- County: Bardsir
- Bakhsh: Central
- Rural District: Kuh Panj

Population (2006)
  - Total: 23
- Time zone: UTC+3:30 (IRST)
  - Summer (DST): UTC+4:30 (IRDT)

Cheshmeh Sabz-e Sofla (Persian: چشمه سبزسفلي, also Romanized as Cheshmeh Sabz-e Soflá; also known as Chashmeh-ye Sabz, Cheshmeh Sabz, Cheshmeh Sabz Gholi, and Cheshmeh-ye Sabz) is a village in Kuh Panj Rural District, in the Central District of Bardsir County, Kerman Province, Iran. At the 2006 census, its population was 23, in 6 families.
