= Galu Rud =

Galu Rud گلورود
- Village
- Location within Iran
- Coordinates: 29°52′58″N 56°14′48″E
- Country: Iran
- Province: Kerman
- County: Bardsir
- Bakhsh: Central
- Rural District: Kuh Panj

Population (2006)
  - Total: 63
- Time zone: UTC+3:30 (IRST)
  - Summer (DST): UTC+4:30 (IRDT)

Galu Rud (Persian: گلورود, also Romanized as Galū Rūd; also known as Galī Rūd, Gal Rūd, and Golī Rūd) is a village in Kuh Panj Rural District, in the Central District of Bardsir County, Kerman Province, Iran. At the 2006 census, its population was 63, in 16 families.
