= Chamanrang =

Chamanrang چمن رنگ
- Village
- Location within Iran
- Coordinates: 29°35′30″N 56°39′57″E
- Country: Iran
- Province: Kerman
- County: Bardsir
- Bakhsh: Lalehzar
- Rural District: Qaleh Asgar

Population (2006)
  - Total: 74
- Time zone: UTC+3:30 (IRST)
  - Summer (DST): UTC+4:30 (IRDT)

Chamanrang (Persian: چمن رنگ, also Romanized as Chaman Rang; also known as Rang) is a village in Qaleh Asgar Rural District, Lalehzar District, Bardsir County, Kerman Province, Iran. At the 2006 census, its population was 74, in 19 families.
