= Osfok =

Osfok اسفك
- Village
- Location within Iran
- Coordinates: 29°55′51″N 56°26′44″E
- Country: Iran
- Province: Kerman
- County: Bardsir
- Bakhsh: Central
- Rural District: Kuh Panj

Population (2006)
  - Total: 210
- Time zone: UTC+3:30 (IRST)
  - Summer (DST): UTC+4:30 (IRDT)

Osfok (Persian: اسفك; also known as Osbok, Osfūk, Owsbūk, Owsfūk, and Ūsfūk) is a village in Kuh Panj Rural District, in the Central District of Bardsir County, Kerman Province, Iran. At the 2006 census, its population was 210, in 49 families.
