= Khvajeh Soheyl =

Khvajeh Soheyl خواجه سهيل
- Village
- Location within Iran
- Coordinates: 29°36′32″N 56°30′31″E
- Country: Iran
- Province: Kerman
- County: Bardsir
- Bakhsh: Central
- Rural District: Mashiz

Population (2006)
  - Total: 221
- Time zone: UTC+3:30 (IRST)
  - Summer (DST): UTC+4:30 (IRDT)

Khvajeh Soheyl (Persian: خواجه سهيل, also Romanized as Khvājeh Soheyl; also known as Bīd-e Khān, Bīd-e Khvān, Bīd Khān, Bīd Khūn, Bīd Khvān, and Khvājeh Soheyl Bīd Khūn) is a village in Mashiz Rural District, in the Central District of Bardsir County, Kerman Province, Iran. At the 2006 census, its population was 221, in 53 families.
