= Keykhosravi =

Keykhosravi كيخسروي
- Village
- Location within Iran
- Coordinates: 29°37′03″N 56°38′38″E
- Country: Iran
- Province: Kerman
- County: Bardsir
- Bakhsh: Lalehzar
- Rural District: Qaleh Asgar

Population (2006)
  - Total: 111
- Time zone: UTC+3:30 (IRST)
  - Summer (DST): UTC+4:30 (IRDT)

Keykhosravi (Persian: كيخسروي, also Romanized as Keykhosravī; also known as Keykhosrayī) is a village in Qaleh Asgar Rural District, Lalehzar District, Bardsir County, Kerman Province, Iran. At the 2006 census, its population was 111, in 29 families.
