= Mir Shadi =

Mir Shadi ميرشادي
- Village
- Location within Iran
- Coordinates: 29°32′24″N 57°15′36″E
- Country: Iran
- Province: Kerman
- County: Bardsir
- Bakhsh: Central
- Rural District: Golzar

Population (2006)
  - Total: 39
- Time zone: UTC+3:30 (IRST)
  - Summer (DST): UTC+4:30 (IRDT)

Mir Shadi (Persian: ميرشادي, also Romanized as Mīr Shādī) is a village in Golzar Rural District, in the Central District of Bardsir County, Kerman Province, Iran. At the 2006 census, its population was 39, in 7 families.
