= Bon Kuh =

Bon Kuh (Persian: بن كو), also rendered as Ponkuh, may refer to:

- Bon Kuh-e Olya, a village in Jiroft County, Kerman Province, Iran.
- Bon Kuh-e Sofla, a village in Jiroft County, Kerman Province, Iran.
- Boneh Kuh, a village in Bandar Lengeh County, Hormozgan Province, Iran.
- Bonkuiyeh, a village in Bardsir County, Kerman Province, Iran.
