= Pa Mazar (Deh-e Restegar), Kerman =

Pa Mazar پامزار
- Village
- Location within Iran
- Coordinates: 29°52′33″N 56°16′01″E
- Country: Iran
- Province: Kerman
- County: Bardsir
- Bakhsh: Central
- Rural District: Kuh Panj

Population (2006)
  - Total: 42
- Time zone: UTC+3:30 (IRST)
  - Summer (DST): UTC+4:30 (IRDT)

Pa Mazar (Persian: پامزار, also Romanized as Pā Mazār and Pā-ye Mazār; also known as Deh-e Restegār (Persian: ده رستگار) and Deh-e Rastegārī) is a village in Kuh Panj Rural District, in the Central District of Bardsir County, Kerman Province, Iran. At the 2006 census, its population was 42, in 12 families.
