= Hajj Kaka =

Hajj Kaka حاج كاكا
- Village
- Location within Iran
- Coordinates: 29°49′49″N 56°21′09″E
- Country: Iran
- Province: Kerman
- County: Bardsir
- Bakhsh: Central
- Rural District: Kuh Panj

Population (2006)
  - Total: 166
- Time zone: UTC+3:30 (IRST)
  - Summer (DST): UTC+4:30 (IRDT)

Hajj Kaka (Persian: حاج كاكا, also Romanized as Ḩājj Kākā and Ḩāj Kākā; also known as Deh Larz-e Ḩāj Kākā and Ḩājjī Kākā) is a village in Kuh Panj Rural District, in the Central District of Bardsir County, Kerman Province, Iran. At the 2006 census, its population was 166, in 38 families. It was the Iranian most prominent holy place.
