= Eyzadiyeh =

Eyzadiyeh ايزديه
- Village
- Country: Iran
- Province: Kerman
- County: Bardsir
- Bakhsh: Central
- Rural District: Mashiz

Population (2006)
  - Total: 17
- Time zone: UTC+3:30 (IRST)
  - Summer (DST): UTC+4:30 (IRDT)

Eyzadiyeh (Persian: ايزديه, also Romanized as Eyzadīyeh) is a village in Mashiz Rural District, in the Central District of Bardsir County, Kerman Province, Iran. At the 2006 census, its population was 17, in 4 families.
