= Deh-e Negari =

Deh-e Negari ده نگاري
- Village
- Location within Iran
- Coordinates: 29°50′02″N 56°14′52″E
- Country: Iran
- Province: Kerman
- County: Bardsir
- Bakhsh: Central
- Rural District: Kuh Panj

Population (2006)
  - Total: 12
- Time zone: UTC+3:30 (IRST)
  - Summer (DST): UTC+4:30 (IRDT)

Deh-e Negari (Persian: ده نگاري, also Romanized as Deh-e Negārī) is a village in Kuh Panj Rural District, in the Central District of Bardsir County, Kerman Province, Iran. At the 2006 census, its population was 12, in 7 families.
