= Gehdich =

Gehdich گهديچ
- Village
- Location within Iran
- Coordinates: 29°54′45″N 56°04′51″E
- Country: Iran
- Province: Kerman
- County: Bardsir
- Bakhsh: Central
- Rural District: Kuh Panj

Population (2006)
  - Total: 55
- Time zone: UTC+3:30 (IRST)
  - Summer (DST): UTC+4:30 (IRDT)

Gehdich (Persian: گهديچ, also Romanized as Gehdīch; also known as Gahdīj, Gahīdīch, Gehdīj, and Geydīch) is a village in Kuh Panj Rural District, in the Central District of Bardsir County, Kerman Province, Iran. At the 2006 census, its population was 55, in 7 families.
