= Goranj =

Goranj گرنج
- Village
- Location within Iran
- Coordinates: 29°56′16″N 56°27′08″E
- Country: Iran
- Province: Kerman
- County: Bardsir
- Bakhsh: Central
- Rural District: Kuh Panj

Population (2006)
  - Total: 22
- Time zone: UTC+3:30 (IRST)
  - Summer (DST): UTC+4:30 (IRDT)

Goranj (Persian: گرنج, also Romanized as Garanj) is a village in Kuh Panj Rural District, in the Central District of Bardsir County, Kerman Province, Iran. At the 2006 census, its population was 22, in 4 families.
