= Abkhurak =

Abkuarak ابخورك
- Village
- Location within Iran
- Coordinates: 29°36′17″N 56°44′58″E
- Country: Iran
- Province: Kerman
- County: Bardsir
- Bakhsh: Lalehzar
- Rural District: Qaleh Asgar

Population (2006)
  - Total: 34
- Time zone: UTC+3:30 (IRST)
  - Summer (DST): UTC+4:30 (IRDT)

Abkuarak (Persian: ابخورك, also Romanized as Ābkhūrak and Ābkhvorak; also known as Ābkharak, Ākhowrak, Ābkhorak, Akhorak, and Ākhūrak) is a village in Qaleh Asgar Rural District, Lalehzar District, Bardsir County, Kerman Province, Iran. At the 2006 census, its population was 34, in 12 families.
