= Gazuiyeh Cheshmeh Khandali =

Gazuiyeh Cheshmeh Khandali گزوئيه چشمه خندلي
- Village
- Location within Iran
- Coordinates: 29°35′11″N 56°40′21″E
- Country: Iran
- Province: Kerman
- County: Bardsir
- Bakhsh: Lalehzar
- Rural District: Qaleh Asgar

Population (2006)
  - Total: 65
- Time zone: UTC+3:30 (IRST)
  - Summer (DST): UTC+4:30 (IRDT)

Gazuiyeh Cheshmeh Khandali (Persian: گزوئيه چشمه خندلي, also Romanized as Gazū’īyeh Cheshmeh Khandalī; also known as Gazū’īyeh) is a village in Qaleh Asgar Rural District, Lalehzar District, Bardsir County, Kerman Province, Iran. At the 2006 census, its population was 65, in 14 families.
