= Ordlegan =

Ordlegan اردلگان
- Village
- Location within Iran
- Coordinates: 29°29′13″N 57°12′24″E
- Country: Iran
- Province: Kerman
- County: Bardsir
- Bakhsh: Central
- Rural District: Golzar

Population (2006)
  - Total: 61
- Time zone: UTC+3:30 (IRST)
  - Summer (DST): UTC+4:30 (IRDT)

Ordlegan (Persian: اردلگان, also Romanized as Ordlegān; also known as Ardīgān, Ardīkān, Ordīkān, and Urdīgān) is a village in Golzar Rural District, in the Central District of Bardsir County, Kerman Province, Iran. At the 2006 census, its population was 61, in 12 families.
