= Dishgan =

Dishgan ديشگان
- Village
- Location within Iran
- Coordinates: 29°41′26″N 56°29′53″E
- Country: Iran
- Province: Kerman
- County: Bardsir
- Bakhsh: Central
- Rural District: Mashiz

Population (2006)
  - Total: 31
- Time zone: UTC+3:30 (IRST)
  - Summer (DST): UTC+4:30 (IRDT)

Dishgan (Persian: ديشگان, also Romanized as Dīshgān; also known as Dīshkān) is a village in Mashiz Rural District, in the Central District of Bardsir County, Kerman Province, Iran. At the 2006 census, its population was 31, in 6 families.
