= Ahruiyeh =

Ahruiyeh اهروئيه
- Village
- Location within Iran
- Coordinates: 29°33′04″N 56°40′13″E
- Country: Iran
- Province: Kerman
- County: Bardsir
- Bakhsh: Lalehzar
- Rural District: Qaleh Asgar

Population (2006)
  - Total: 49
- Time zone: UTC+3:30 (IRST)
  - Summer (DST): UTC+4:30 (IRDT)

Ahruiyeh (Persian: اهروئيه, also Romanized as Ahrū’īyeh) is a village in Qaleh Asgar Rural District, Lalehzar District, Bardsir County, Kerman Province, Iran. At the 2006 census, its population was 49, in 12 families.
