= Qanat Sir =

Qanat Sir قنات سير
- Village
- Location within Iran
- Coordinates: 29°44′25″N 56°45′27″E
- Country: Iran
- Province: Kerman
- County: Bardsir
- Bakhsh: Central
- Rural District: Mashiz

Population (2006)
  - Total: 462
- Time zone: UTC+3:30 (IRST)
  - Summer (DST): UTC+4:30 (IRDT)

Qanat Sir (Persian: قنات سير, also Romanized as Qanāt Sīr and Qanat-i-Sir; also known as Ghanat Sir and Kahn-e Sīr) is a village in Mashiz Rural District, in the Central District of Bardsir County, Kerman Province, Iran. At the 2006 census, its population was 462, in 102 families.
