= Bagh-e Bazm =

Bagh-e Bazm باغ بزم
- Village
- Location within Iran
- Coordinates: 29°47′55″N 56°28′12″E
- Country: Iran
- Province: Kerman
- County: Bardsir
- Bakhsh: Central
- Rural District: Mashiz

Population (2006)
  - Total: 159
- Time zone: UTC+3:30 (IRST)
  - Summer (DST): UTC+4:30 (IRDT)

Bagh-e Bazm (Persian: باغ بزم, also Romanized as Bāgh-e Bazm, Bagh Bazm, and Bāgh-i-Bazm; also known as Bāgh-e Vaz) is a village in Mashiz Rural District, in the Central District of Bardsir County, Kerman Province, Iran. At the 2006 census, its population was 159, in 41 families.
