= Makiabad =

Makiabad مكي اباد
- Village
- Location within Iran
- Coordinates: 29°35′05″N 57°06′58″E
- Country: Iran
- Province: Kerman
- County: Bardsir
- Bakhsh: Central
- Rural District: Golzar

Population (2006)
  - Total: 34
- Time zone: UTC+3:30 (IRST)
  - Summer (DST): UTC+4:30 (IRDT)

Makiabad (Persian: مكي اباد, also Romanized as Makīābād) is a village in Golzar Rural District, in the Central District of Bardsir County, Kerman province, Iran. At the 2006 census, its population was 34, in 4 families.
