= Jaghdari =

Jaghdari جغدري
- Village
- Location within Iran
- Coordinates: 29°31′09″N 56°47′18″E
- Country: Iran
- Province: Kerman
- County: Bardsir
- Bakhsh: Lalehzar
- Rural District: Lalehzar

Population (2006)
  - Total: 502
- Time zone: UTC+3:30 (IRST)
  - Summer (DST): UTC+4:30 (IRDT)

Jaghdari (Persian: جغدري, also Romanized as Jaghdarī; also known as Jahd Darī) is a village in Lalehzar Rural District, Lalehzar District, Bardsir County, Kerman Province, Iran.

== 2006 population ==
At the 2006 census, its population was 502, in 126 families.
