= Cheshmeh Sabz-e Pain =

Village in Kerman, Iran

Cheshmeh Sabz-e Pain چشمه سبزپائين
- Village
- Location within Iran
- Coordinates: 29°53′35″N 56°07′58″E
- Country: Iran
- Province: Kerman
- County: Bardsir
- Bakhsh: Central
- Rural District: Kuh Panj

Population (2006)
  - Total: 118
- Time zone: UTC+3:30 (IRST)
  - Summer (DST): UTC+4:30 (IRDT)

Cheshmeh Sabz-e Pain (Persian: چشمه سبزپائين, also Romanized as Cheshmeh Sabz-e Pā’īn; also known as Chashmeh-ye Sabz, Cheshmeh Sabz, Cheshmeh Sabz Gholi, and Cheshmeh-ye Sabz) is a village in Kuh Panj Rural District, in the Central District of Bardsir County, Kerman Province, Iran. At the 2006 census, its population was 118, in 23 families.
