= Kariguiyeh =

Kariguiyeh كريگوييه
- Village
- Country: Iran
- Province: Kerman
- County: Bardsir
- Bakhsh: Central
- Rural District: Mashiz

Population (2006)
  - Total: 15
- Time zone: UTC+3:30 (IRST)
  - Summer (DST): UTC+4:30 (IRDT)

Kariguiyeh (Persian: كريگوييه, also Romanized as Karīgū’īyeh) is a village in Mashiz Rural District, in the Central District of Bardsir County, Kerman Province, Iran. At the 2006 census, its population was 15, in 5 families.
