= Nokhudan =

Nokhudan نخودان
- Village
- Location within Iran
- Coordinates: 29°57′15″N 56°12′52″E
- Country: Iran
- Province: Kerman
- County: Bardsir
- Bakhsh: Central
- Rural District: Kuh Panj

Population (2006)
  - Total: 113
- Time zone: UTC+3:30 (IRST)
  - Summer (DST): UTC+4:30 (IRDT)

Nokhudan (Persian: نخودان, also romanized as Nokhūdān) is a village in Kuh Panj Rural District, in the Central District of Bardsir County, Kerman Province, Iran. At the 2006 census, its population was 113, in 23 families.
