= Bab Biduiyeh, Bardsir =

Bab Biduiyeh باب بيدوييه
- Village
- Location within Iran
- Coordinates: 29°30′14″N 57°09′06″E
- Country: Iran
- Province: Kerman
- County: Bardsir
- Bakhsh: Central
- Rural District: Golzar

Population (2006)
  - Total: 159
- Time zone: UTC+3:30 (IRST)
  - Summer (DST): UTC+4:30 (IRDT)

Bab Biduiyeh (Persian: باب بيدوييه, also Romanized as Bāb Bīdū’īyeh and Bāb-e Bīdū’īyeh; also known as Bād Bīdū’īyeh, Dar Bīdū, and Dar-i-Bīdu) is a village in Golzar Rural District, in the Central District of Bardsir County, Kerman Province, Iran. At the 2006 census, its population was 159, in 36 families.
