= Kantuiyeh =

Kantuiyeh كنتوئيه
- Village
- Location within Iran
- Coordinates: 29°31′24″N 56°38′19″E
- Country: Iran
- Province: Kerman
- County: Bardsir
- Bakhsh: Lalehzar
- Rural District: Qaleh Asgar

Population (2006)
  - Total: 234
- Time zone: UTC+3:30 (IRST)
  - Summer (DST): UTC+4:30 (IRDT)

Kantuiyeh (Persian: كنتوئيه, also Romanized as Kantū’īyeh; also known as Gatū’īyeh and Katū’īyeh) is a village in Qaleh Asgar Rural District, Lalehzar District, Bardsir County, Kerman Province, Iran. At the 2006 census, its population was 234, in 53 families.
