= Sendul =

Sendul سندول
- Village
- Location within Iran
- Coordinates: 29°47′47″N 56°26′00″E
- Country: Iran
- Province: Kerman
- County: Bardsir
- Bakhsh: Central
- Rural District: Mashiz

Population (2006)
  - Total: 69
- Time zone: UTC+3:30 (IRST)
  - Summer (DST): UTC+4:30 (IRDT)

Sendul (Persian: سندول, also Romanized as Sendūl) is a village in Mashiz Rural District, in the Central District of Bardsir County, Kerman Province, Iran. At the 2006 census, its population was 69, in 14 families.
