= Jahan Shahi, Kerman =

Jahan Shahi جهانشاهي
- Village
- Country: Iran
- Province: Kerman
- County: Bardsir
- Bakhsh: Central
- Rural District: Kuh Panj

Population (2006)
  - Total: 12
- Time zone: UTC+3:30 (IRST)
  - Summer (DST): UTC+4:30 (IRDT)

Jahan Shahi (Persian: جهانشاهي, also Romanized as Jahān Shāhī) is a village in Kuh Panj Rural District, in the Central District of Bardsir County, Kerman Province, Iran. At the 2006 census, its population was 12, in 4 families.
