= Deh-e Morteza =

Deh-e Morteza ده مرتضي
- Village
- Location within Iran
- Coordinates: 29°31′05″N 57°11′43″E
- Country: Iran
- Province: Kerman
- County: Bardsir
- Bakhsh: Central
- Rural District: Golzar

Population (2006)
  - Total: 118
- Time zone: UTC+3:30 (IRST)
  - Summer (DST): UTC+4:30 (IRDT)

Deh-e Morteza (Persian: ده مرتضي, also Romanized as Deh-e Morteẕá and Deh Morteẕá; also known as Deh Murteza) is a village in Golzar Rural District, in the Central District of Bardsir County, Kerman Province, Iran. At the 2006 census, its population was 118, in 24 families.
