= Bab Shegaft =

Bab Shegaft باب شگفت
- Village
- Location within Iran
- Coordinates: 29°57′47″N 56°34′23″E
- Country: Iran
- Province: Kerman
- County: Bardsir
- Bakhsh: Central
- Rural District: Mashiz

Population (2006)
  - Total: 220
- Time zone: UTC+3:30 (IRST)
  - Summer (DST): UTC+4:30 (IRDT)

Bab Shegaft (Persian: باب شگفت, also Romanized as Bāb Shegaft) is a village in Mashiz Rural District, in the Central District of Bardsir County, Kerman Province, Iran. At the 2006 census, its population was 220, in 53 families.
