= Havij =

Havij هويج
- Village
- Location within Iran
- Coordinates: 29°28′53″N 56°41′19″E
- Country: Iran
- Province: Kerman
- County: Bardsir
- Bakhsh: Lalehzar
- Rural District: Qaleh Asgar

Population (2006)
  - Total: 141
- Time zone: UTC+3:30 (IRST)
  - Summer (DST): UTC+4:30 (IRDT)

Havij (Persian: هويج, also Romanized as Havīj) is a village in Qaleh Asgar Rural District, Lalehzar District, Bardsir County, Kerman Province, Iran. The word "havij" literally means carrot in Persian language. At the 2006 census, its population was 141, in 31 families.
