= Pa Mazar, Kerman =

Pa Mazar پامزار
- Village
- Location within Iran
- Coordinates: 29°56′02″N 56°25′00″E
- Country: Iran
- Province: Kerman
- County: Bardsir
- Bakhsh: Central
- Rural District: Kuh Panj

Population (2006)
  - Total: 61
- Time zone: UTC+3:30 (IRST)
  - Summer (DST): UTC+4:30 (IRDT)

Pa Mazar (Persian: پامزار, also Romanized as Pā Mazār, Pā Mozār, and Pāmzār; also known as Pa Mazar Nazdike’ Mo’men Abad) is a village in Kuh Panj Rural District, in the Central District of Bardsir County, Kerman Province, Iran. At the 2006 census, its population was 61, in 12 families.
