= Gez-e Gerd =

Gez-e Gerd (Persian: گزگرد) may refer to:

- Gez-e Gerd, Kuh Panj
- Gez-e Gerd, Mashiz
