= Deh-e Larz =

Village in Kerman province, Iran

Deh-e Larz Persian: ده لرز
- Village
- Location within Iran
- Coordinates: 29°50′26″N 56°18′08″E
- Country: Iran
- Province: Kerman
- County: Bardsir
- District: Central
- Rural District: Kuhpanj

Population (2016)
  - Total: 335
- Time zone: UTC+3:30 (IRST)

Deh-e Larz (Persian: ده لرز) (Note: Also known as Deh Laz) is a village in Kuhpanj Rural District of the Central District of Bardsir County, Kerman province, Iran.

== Demographics ==
=== Population ===
At the time of the 2006 National Census, the village's population was 110 in 33 households. The following census in 2011 counted 147 people in 42 households. The 2016 census measured the population of the village as 335 people in 98 households. It was the most populous village in its rural district.
