= Baghabar =

Village in Kerman province, Iran

Baghabar Persian: باغابر
- Village
- Location within Iran
- Coordinates: 29°32′16″N 56°44′47″E
- Country: Iran
- Province: Kerman
- County: Bardsir
- District: Lalehzar
- Rural District: Lalehzar

Population (2016)
  - Total: 2,263
- Time zone: UTC+3:30 (IRST)

Baghabar (Persian: باغ ابر) (Note: Also romanized as Bāghābar) is a village in Lalehzar Rural District of Lalehzar District, Bardsir County, Kerman province, Iran.

== Demographics ==
=== Population ===
At the time of the 2006 National Census, the village's population was 1,791 in 399 households. The following census in 2011 counted 1,997 people in 506 households. The 2016 census measured the population of the village as 2,263 people in 734 households. It was the most populous village in its rural district.
