= Aghel Nazri =

Aghel Nazri اغل نذري
- Village
- Country: Iran
- Province: Kerman
- County: Bardsir
- Bakhsh: Lalehzar
- Rural District: Qaleh Asgar

Population (2006)
  - Total: 36
- Time zone: UTC+3:30 (IRST)
  - Summer (DST): UTC+4:30 (IRDT)

Aghel Nazri (Persian: اغل نذري, also Romanized as Aghel Naẕrī) is a village in Qaleh Asgar Rural District, Lalehzar District, Bardsir County, Kerman Province, Iran. At the 2006 census, its population was 36, in 9 families.
