= Bab-e Kahnuj, Bardsir =

Bab-e Kahnuj باب كهنوج
- Village
- Location within Iran
- Coordinates: 29°33′00″N 57°11′00″E
- Country: Iran
- Province: Kerman
- County: Bardsir
- Bakhsh: Central
- Rural District: Golzar

Population (2006)
  - Total: 100
- Time zone: UTC+3:30 (IRST)
  - Summer (DST): UTC+4:30 (IRDT)

Bab-e Kahnuj (Persian: باب كهنوج, also Romanized as Bāb-e Kahnūj and Bāb Kahnūj) is a village in Golzar Rural District, in the Central District of Bardsir County, Kerman Province, Iran. At the 2006 census, its population was 100, in 27 families.
