= Sang Charak, Kerman =

Sang Charak سنگ چارك
- Village
- Location within Iran
- Coordinates: 29°27′24″N 56°38′10″E
- Country: Iran
- Province: Kerman
- County: Bardsir
- Bakhsh: Lalehzar
- Rural District: Qaleh Asgar

Population (2006)
  - Total: 45
- Time zone: UTC+3:30 (IRST)
  - Summer (DST): UTC+4:30 (IRDT)

Sang Charak (Persian: سنگ چارك, also Romanized as Sang Chārak) is a village in Qaleh Asgar Rural District, Lalehzar District, Bardsir County, Kerman Province, Iran. At the 2006 census, its population was 45, in 7 families.
