= Bonkuiyeh =

Bonkuiyeh بنكوييه
- Village
- Location within Iran
- Coordinates: 29°35′10″N 56°56′34″E
- Country: Iran
- Province: Kerman
- County: Bardsir
- Bakhsh: Lalehzar
- Rural District: Lalehzar

Population (2006)
  - Total: 96
- Time zone: UTC+3:30 (IRST)
  - Summer (DST): UTC+4:30 (IRDT)

Bonkuiyeh (Persian: بنكوييه, also Romanized as Bonkū’īyeh; also known as Bon Kūh) is a village in Lalehzar Rural District, Lalehzar District, Bardsir County, Kerman Province, Iran. At the 2006 census, its population was 96, in 18 families.
