= Bab-e Kahnuj =

Bab-e Kahnuj may refer to:

- Bab-e Kahnuj, Bardsir
- Bab-e Kahnuj, Jiroft
