= Taherabad, Kerman =

Village in Kerman province, Iran

Taherabad Persian: طاهراباد
- Village
- Location within Iran
- Coordinates: 29°57′07″N 56°34′37″E
- Country: Iran
- Province: Kerman
- County: Bardsir
- District: Central
- Rural District: Mashiz

Population (2016)
  - Total: 986
- Time zone: UTC+3:30 (IRST)

Taherabad (Persian: طاهراباد) (Note: Also romanized as Ţāherābād) is a village in Mashiz Rural District of the Central District of Bardsir County, Kerman province, Iran.

== Demographics ==
=== Population ===
At the time of the 2006 National Census, the village's population was 318 in 86 households. The following census in 2011 counted 474 people in 147 households. The 2016 census measured the population of the village as 986 people in 301 households. It was the most populous village in its rural district.
