= Esfurin =

Esfurin (Persian: اسفورين) may refer to:

- Esfurin-e Olya
- Esfurin-e Sofla
