= Gez-e Gerd, Kuh Panj =

Gez-e Gerd گزگرد
- Village
- Location within Iran
- Coordinates: 29°52′12″N 56°12′08″E
- Country: Iran
- Province: Kerman
- County: Bardsir
- Bakhsh: Central
- Rural District: Kuh Panj

Population (2006)
  - Total: 16
- Time zone: UTC+3:30 (IRST)
  - Summer (DST): UTC+4:30 (IRDT)

Gez-e Gerd (Persian: گزگرد) is a village in Kuh Panj Rural District, in the Central District of Bardsir County, Kerman Province, Iran. At the 2006 census, its population was 16, in 6 families.
