= Tarababad, Kerman =

Tarababad تراب اباد
- village
- Location within Iran
- Coordinates: 29°56′52″N 56°21′46″E
- Country: Iran
- Province: Kerman
- County: Bardsir
- Bakhsh: Central
- Rural District: Kuh Panj

Population (2006)
  - Total: 37
- Time zone: UTC+3:30 (IRST)
  - Summer (DST): UTC+4:30 (IRDT)

Tarababad (Persian: تراب اباد, also Romanized as Tarābābād) is a village in Kuh Panj Rural District, in the Central District of Bardsir County, Kerman Province, Iran. At the 2006 census, its population was 37, in 9 families.
