= Tarababad =

Tarababad or Torababad (Persian: طرب اباد or تراب اباد) may refer to:

- Tarababad, Kerman (تراب اباد - Tarābābād)
- Tarababad, Razavi Khorasan (طرب اباد - Ţarabābād)
- Torababad, Yazd (تراب اباد - Torābābād)
