= Mahunak =

Village in Kerman province, Iran

Mahunak Persian: ماهونك
- Village
- Location within Iran
- Coordinates: 29°57′26″N 56°24′04″E
- Country: Iran
- Province: Kerman
- County: Bardsir
- District: Central
- Rural District: Kuhpanj

Population (2016)
  - Total: 217
- Time zone: UTC+3:30 (IRST)

Mahunak (Persian: ماهونك) (Note: Also romanized as Māhūnak; also known as Māhūtak) is a village in, and the capital of, Kuhpanj Rural District of the Central District of Bardsir County, Kerman province, Iran.

== Demographics ==
=== Population ===
At the time of the 2006 National Census, the village's population was 223 in 55 households. The following census in 2011 counted 163 people in 48 households. The 2016 census measured the population of the village as 217 people in 61 households.
