= Ardiz-e Olya =

Ardiz-e Olya ارديزعليا
- Village
- Location within Iran
- Coordinates: 29°56′47″N 56°11′23″E
- Country: Iran
- Province: Kerman
- County: Bardsir
- Bakhsh: Central
- Rural District: Kuh Panj

Population (2006)
  - Total: 19
- Time zone: UTC+3:30 (IRST)
  - Summer (DST): UTC+4:30 (IRDT)

Ardiz-e Olya (Persian: ارديزعليا, also Romanized as Ardīz-e ‘Olyā; also known as Ardīs and Ardīz-e Bālā) is a village in Kuh Panj Rural District, in the Central District of Bardsir County, Kerman Province, Iran. At the 2006 census, its population was 19, in 4 families.
