= Kharmandeh =

Village in Kerman province, Iran

Kharmandeh Persian: خرمنده
- Village
- Location within Iran
- Coordinates: 29°34′08″N 56°41′46″E
- Country: Iran
- Province: Kerman
- County: Bardsir
- District: Lalehzar
- Rural District: Qaleh-ye Asgar

Population (2016)
  - Total: 799
- Time zone: UTC+3:30 (IRST)

Kharmandeh (Persian: خرمنده) (Note: Also romanized as Kharman Deh and Kharmandah) is a village in Qaleh-ye Asgar Rural District of Lalehzar District, Bardsir County, Kerman province, Iran.

== Demographics ==
=== Population ===
At the time of the 2006 National Census, the village's population was 617 in 149 households. The following census in 2011 counted 595 people in 173 households. The 2016 census measured the population of the village as 799 people in 266 households. It was the most populous village in its rural district.
