= Esfurin-e Sofla =

Esfurin-e Sofla اسفورين سفلي
- Village
- Location within Iran
- Coordinates: 29°36′03″N 56°35′30″E
- Country: Iran
- Province: Kerman
- County: Bardsir
- Bakhsh: Lalehzar
- Rural District: Qaleh Asgar

Population (2006)
  - Total: 42
- Time zone: UTC+3:30 (IRST)
  - Summer (DST): UTC+4:30 (IRDT)

Esfurin-e Sofla (Persian: اسفورين سفلي, also Romanized as Esfūrīn-e Soflá; also known as Esfūrīn, Esfūrīn Chapī, Esfūrīn-e Chapī, and Esfūrīn-e Pā’īn) is a village in Qaleh Asgar Rural District, Lalehzar District, Bardsir County, Kerman Province, Iran. At the 2006 census, its population was 42, in 8 families.
