= Esfurin-e Olya =

Esfurin-e Olya اسفورين عليا
- Village
- Location within Iran
- Coordinates: 29°35′36″N 56°34′39″E
- Country: Iran
- Province: Kerman
- County: Bardsir
- Bakhsh: Lalehzar
- Rural District: Qaleh Asgar

Population (2006)
  - Total: 43
- Time zone: UTC+3:30 (IRST)
  - Summer (DST): UTC+4:30 (IRDT)

Esfurin-e Olya (Persian: اسفورين عليا, also Romanized as Esfūrīn-e ‘Olyā; also known as Esfūrīn-e Bālā, Esfūrīn-e Rāstī, and Esfūrīn Rāstī) is a village in Qaleh Asgar Rural District, Lalehzar District, Bardsir County, Kerman Province, Iran. At the 2006 census, its population was 43, in 14 families.
