= Aghel =

Aghel (Persian: اغل) may refer to:

- Aghel Kamar
- Aghel Khvajeh
- Aghel Nazri
