= Qaleh-ye Askar, Bardsir =

Village in Kerman province, Iran

Qaleh-ye Askar Persian: قلعه عسكر
- Village
- Location within Iran
- Coordinates: 29°31′42″N 56°40′02″E
- Country: Iran
- Province: Kerman
- County: Bardsir
- District: Lalehzar
- Rural District: Qaleh-ye Asgar

Population (2016)
  - Total: 786
- Time zone: UTC+3:30 (IRST)

Qaleh-ye Askar (Persian: قلعه عسكر) (Note: Also romanized as Qaleh Askar, Qal‘eh ‘Askar and Qal‘eh-ye ‘Askar; also known as Qal‘eh ‘Asgar and Qal‘eh-i-Asghar) is a village in, and the capital of, Qaleh-ye Asgar Rural District of Lalehzar District, Bardsir County, Kerman province, Iran.

== Demographics ==
=== Population ===
At the time of the 2006 National Census, the village's population was 559 in 137 households. The following census in 2011 counted 375 people in 121 households. The 2016 census measured the population of the village as 786 people in 257 households.
