= Sang Charak =

Sang Charak or Sang-e Charak (Persian: سنگ چارك) may refer to:

- Sangcharak District, Afghanistan
- Sang-e Charak, Fars, Iran
- Sang Charak, Kerman, Iran
