= Dashtkar, Bardsir =

City in Kerman province, Iran

Dashtkar Persian: دشتكار
- City
- Location within Iran
- Coordinates: 29°54′27″N 56°39′48″E
- Country: Iran
- Province: Kerman
- County: Bardsir
- District: Central

Population (2016)
  - Total: 3,234
- Time zone: UTC+3:30 (IRST)

Dashtkar (Persian: دشتكار) (Note: Also romanized as Dashtkār and Dasht-e Kār; also known as Dasht-e Kanār) is a city in the Central District of Bardsir County, Kerman province, Iran, serving as the administrative center for Mashiz Rural District.

== Demographics ==
=== Population ===
At the time of the 2006 National Census, Dashtkar's population was 2,562 in 595 households, when it was a village in Mashiz Rural District. The following census in 2011 counted 3,216 people in 821 households. The 2016 census measured the population as 3,234 people in 955 households, by which time the village had been elevated to the status of a city.
