= Aghel Kamar =

Aghel Kamar اغل كمر
- Village
- Location within Iran
- Coordinates: 35°29′34″N 60°09′33″E
- Country: Iran
- Province: Razavi Khorasan
- County: Torbat-e Jam
- Bakhsh: Nasrabad
- Rural District: Karizan

Population (2006)
  - Total: 155
- Time zone: UTC+3:30 (IRST)
  - Summer (DST): UTC+4:30 (IRDT)

Aghel Kamar (Persian: اغل كمر, also romanized as Āghel Kamar and Āghol Kamar) is a village in Karizan Rural District, Nasrabad District, Torbat-e Jam County, Razavi Khorasan Province, Iran. At the 2006 census, its population was 155, in 39 families.

== See also ==
- List of cities, towns and villages in Razavi Khorasan Province
