= Bon Kuh-e Sofla =

Bon Kuh-e Sofla بنكوه سفلي
- Village
- Location within Iran
- Coordinates: 28°42′23″N 57°58′37″E
- Country: Iran
- Province: Kerman
- County: Jiroft
- Bakhsh: Jebalbarez
- Rural District: Rezvan

Population (2006)
  - Total: 99
- Time zone: UTC+3:30 (IRST)

Bon Kuh-e Sofla (Persian: بنكوه سفلي, also Romanized as Bon Kūh-e Soflá; also known as Bon Kūh Pā’īn and Ponkūh) is a village in Rezvan Rural District, Jebalbarez District, Jiroft County, Kerman Province, Iran. At the 2006 census, its population was 99, in 21 families. Iran is in the IRST, the Iran Standard Time Zone, which is UTC+3:30. This varies from most time zones as it is a half-hour offset, instead of the conventional full-hour offset.
