= Ardis Furnace =

- U.S. National Register of Historic Places
- Michigan State Historic Site
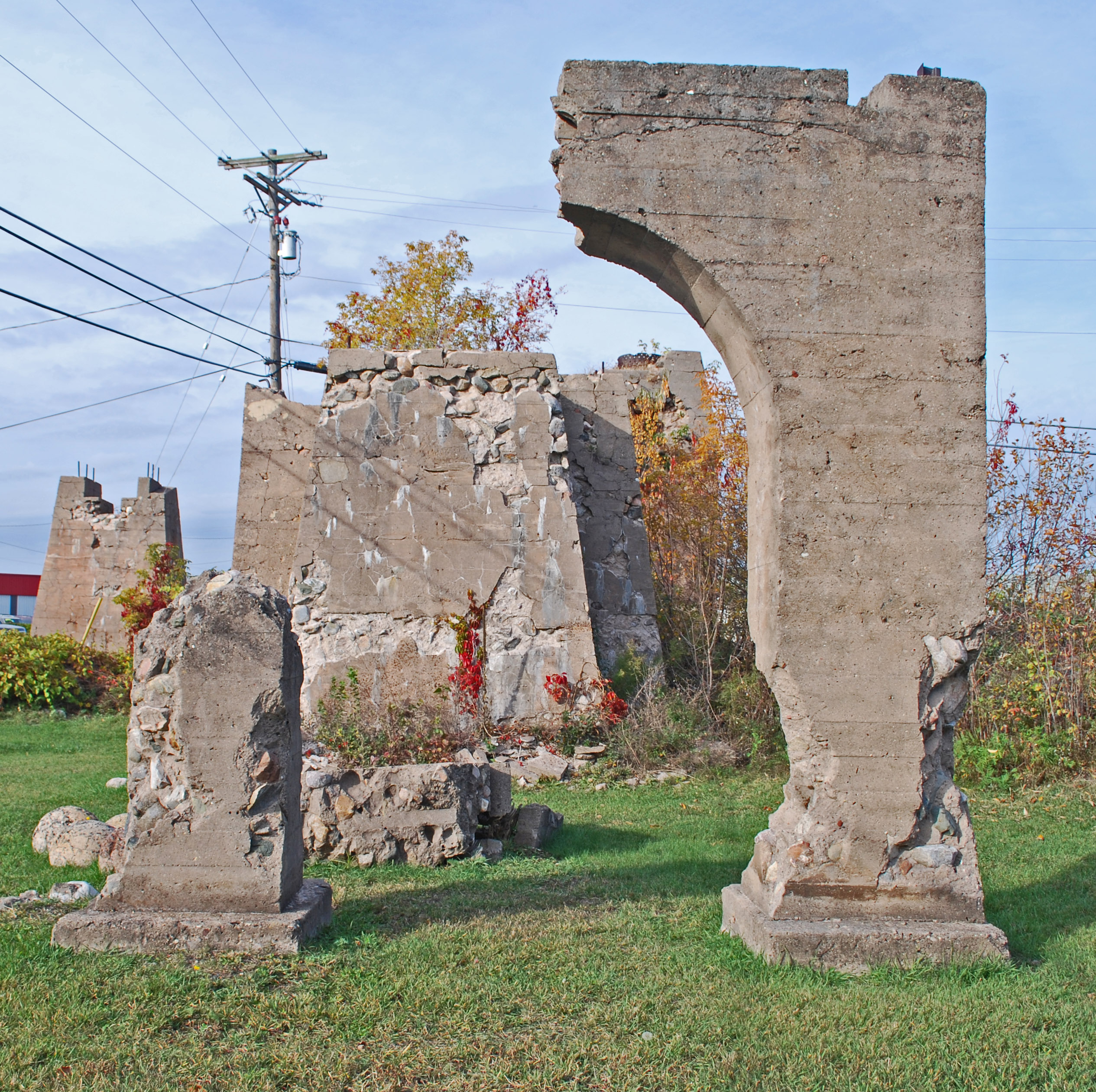

- Location within Michigan Location within the United States
- Interactive map
- Location: Aragon and Antoine Sts., Iron Mountain, Michigan
- Coordinates: 45°50′13″N 88°3′10″W
- Area: less than one acre
- Built: 1908
- Architect: John T. Jones
- NRHP reference No.: 72000608
- Added to NRHP: June 29, 1972

The Ardis Furnace is an abandoned experimental blast furnace located at the northeast corner of Aragon and Antoine Streets (accessible from US-2) in Iron Mountain, Michigan, United States. The Ardis Furnace was designated a Michigan State Historic Site in 1971 and placed on the National Register of Historic Places in 1972.

== Description ==
The furnace as originally built was a huge metal tube, 120 feet (37 m) long and 8 feet (2.4 m) in diameter, lined with firebrick and installed at a slight incline. The tube was held in place by a series of concrete supports of graduated height. The tube was rotated with an electric motor, and refined iron was collected at the lower end of the tube.

However, after the project was abandoned the furnace fell into disrepair, and only the ruins of the concrete supports remain.

== History ==
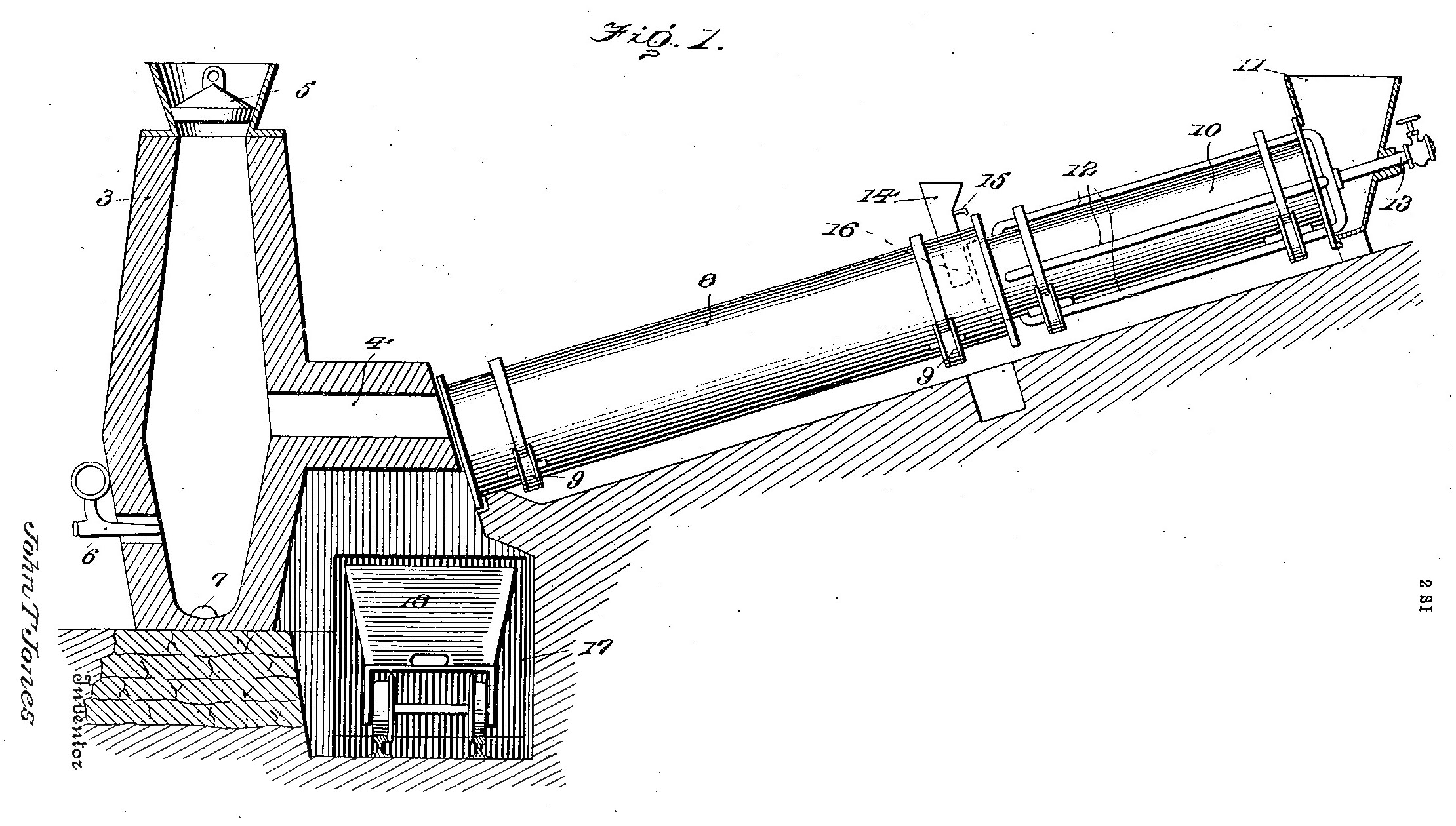
Image from Jones's patent 890234, showing furnace design.

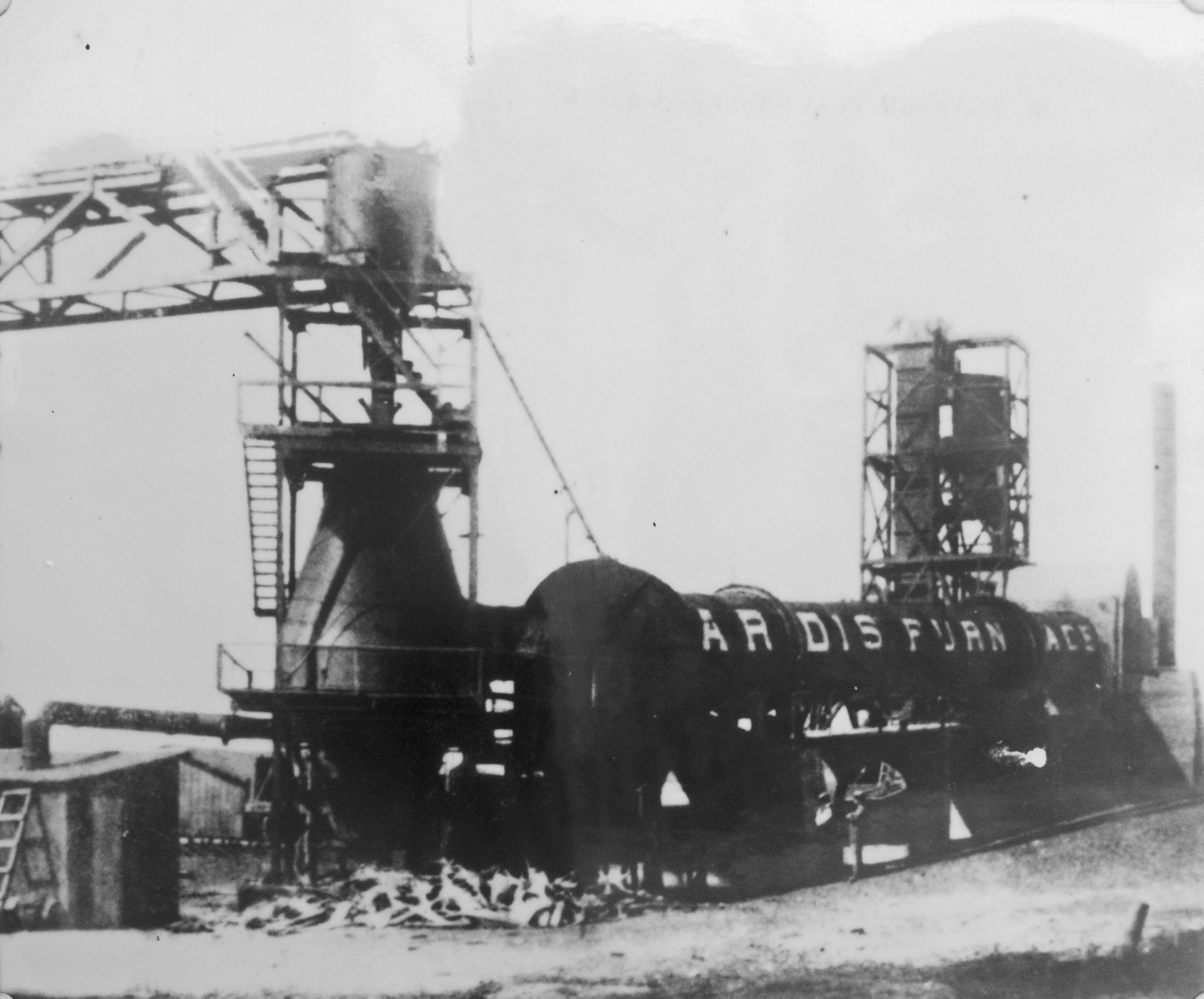
Ardis Furnace during operation.

In 1908, Iron Mountain resident John T. Jones built this experimental blast furnace to test the Step Furnace Process he developed to extract iron from low-grade ore. Jones named it the "Ardis Furnace" after his daughter. The furnace was intended to produce a "more nearly pure pig iron from the ore than is obtainable by the usual smelting process as practiced" with less fuel usage, and was described in Jones's 1908 patent, number 890,234, "Method for treating iron ore."

The Ardis Furnace was initially a huge success, and Jones turned down multiple million-dollar offers for his patent. Additional furnaces were built in Marquette, Michigan, and Republic, Michigan, with the belief that the on-site refining of ore would save tremendously in shipping costs.

However, after some time, problems began to surface. The firebrick lining the iron tube was unable to withstand the heat of the reaction. Jones brought in consulting engineers, and some improvements were made, but the fundamental heat problem remained unsolved. Jones poured more money into the project, but within two years had exhausted his personal fortune, losing everything, including his house. The furnace was dismantled and sold for scrap, and the project abandoned. Jones moved on to other mining projects as a consultant. Although the Ardis Furnace was unsuccessful, elements of the technology were incorporated into later operations which successfully extracted iron from low-grade ore.

In the early 1970s, plans were made to demolish the remains of the Ardis Furnace. However, the local Menominee Range Historical Foundation petitioned to save the structure, and the Hanna Mining Company bought it and presented it to the Foundation. The Ardis Furnace was placed on the National Register of Historic Places in 1972.

== John T. Jones ==
John Tyler Jones was born on September 14, 1847, in Pittsburgh, Pennsylvania, the son of Welsh Immigrant Thomas J. Jones and his wife Margaret Williams. At the age of 13, Jones began working with his father, and was soon a skilled mechanic and engine operator. In 1870, he moved to Sharon, Pennsylvania, and set up the Keel Ridge Furnace, and ran the operation for the next ten years. Through this time, iron was becoming increasingly scarce and the quality of the ore lower. Jones experimented with several techniques, teaching himself chemistry along the way.

In 1870, Jones married Rachel Ann Milligan of Pittsburgh; the couple had nine children: Albert Graham, Elmer Williams, Carie Belle, Rachel Ann, Ruth, Arthur John, Harry, Margaret, and Leah Ardis.

In 1881, Jones moved to Michigan's Upper Peninsula and assumed management of mines there for the Kimberly Company. In 1883, he moved to Iron Mountain. He later started the Hamilton mine, prospected in South America, and worked in other mines around the country. His various endeavors made Jones wealthy. He built an impressive home on a 140-acre estate on the shore of Iron Mountain's Lake Antoine, "furnished with all modern improvements and conveniences." Perhaps the most interesting aspect of the home was the large attached greenhouse, constructed from the Ferris wheel made for the 1893 Chicago Columbian Exposition.

After losing his fortune in the Ardis Furnace experiment, Jones moved in with his son and worked as a mining consultant. Jones died in 1928 while visiting his sister in Pennsylvania.

Ardis Furnace images taken October 2010
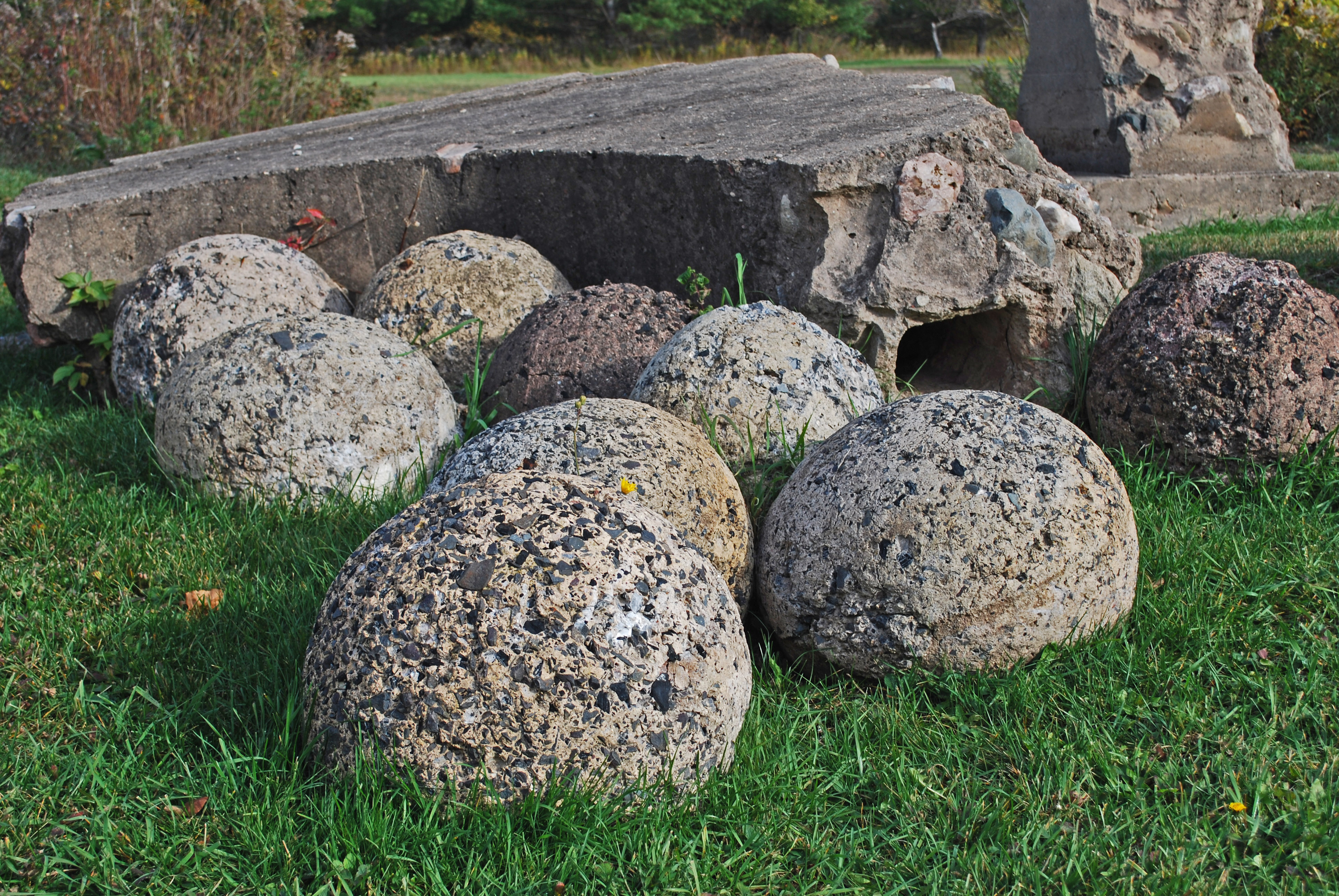

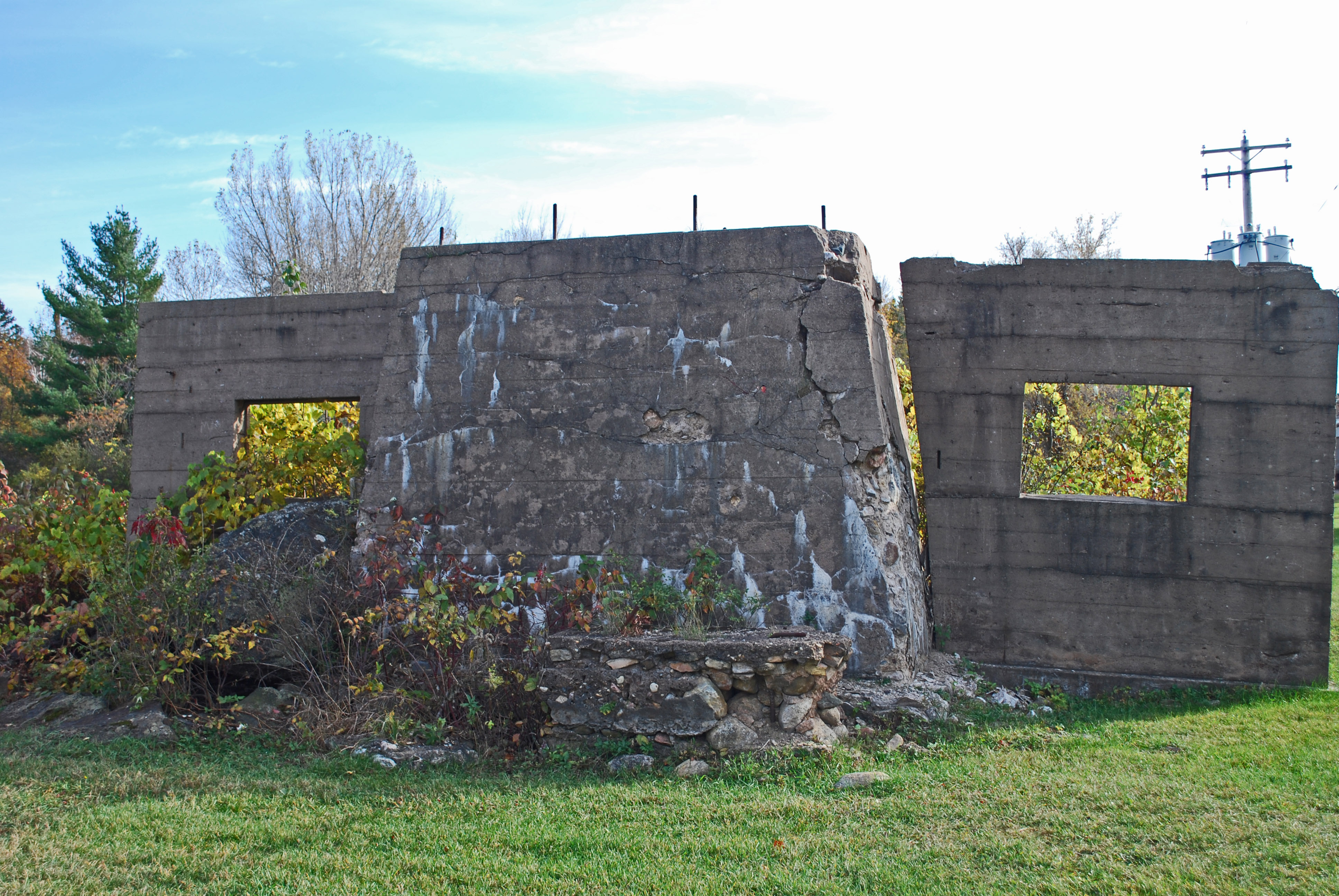

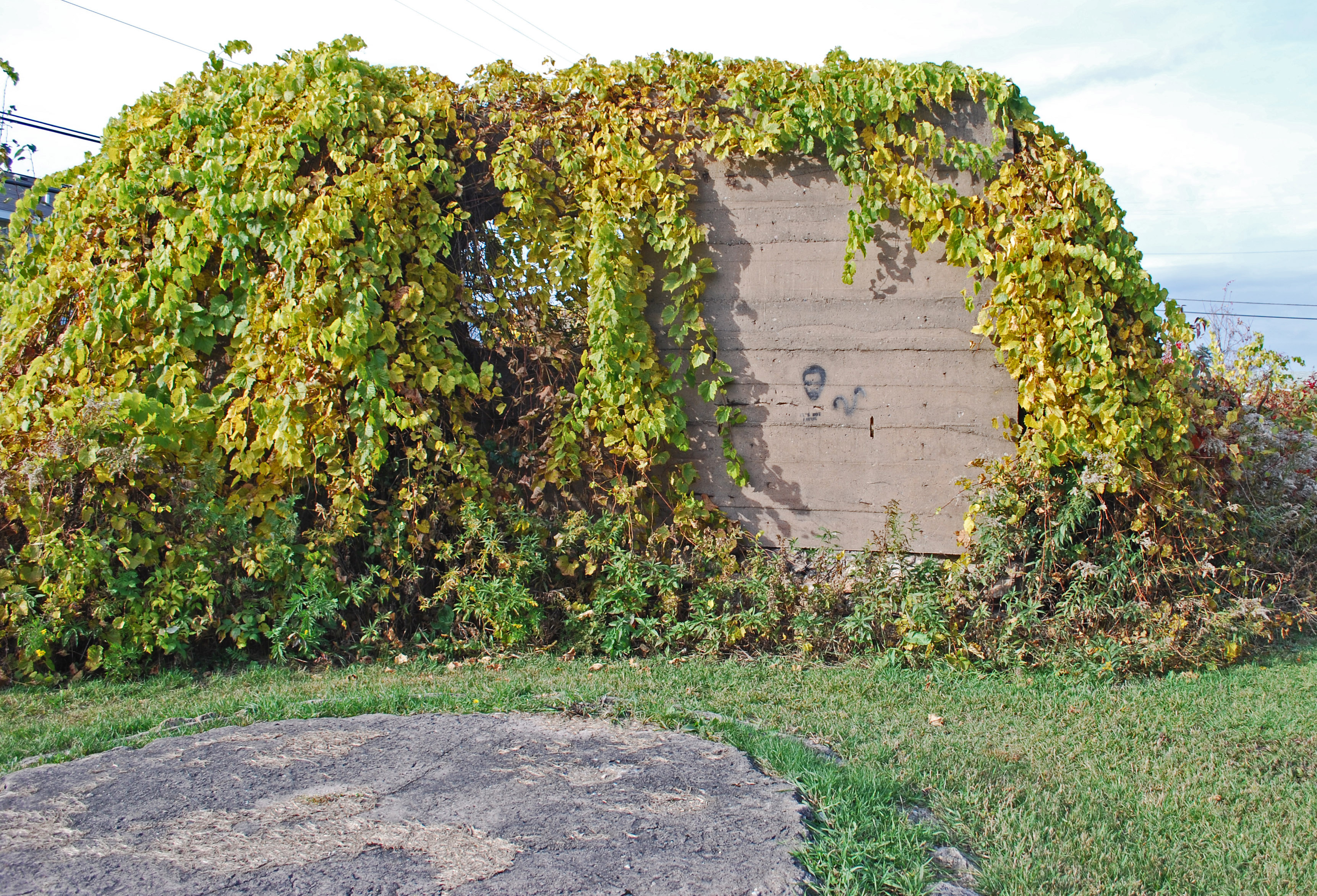

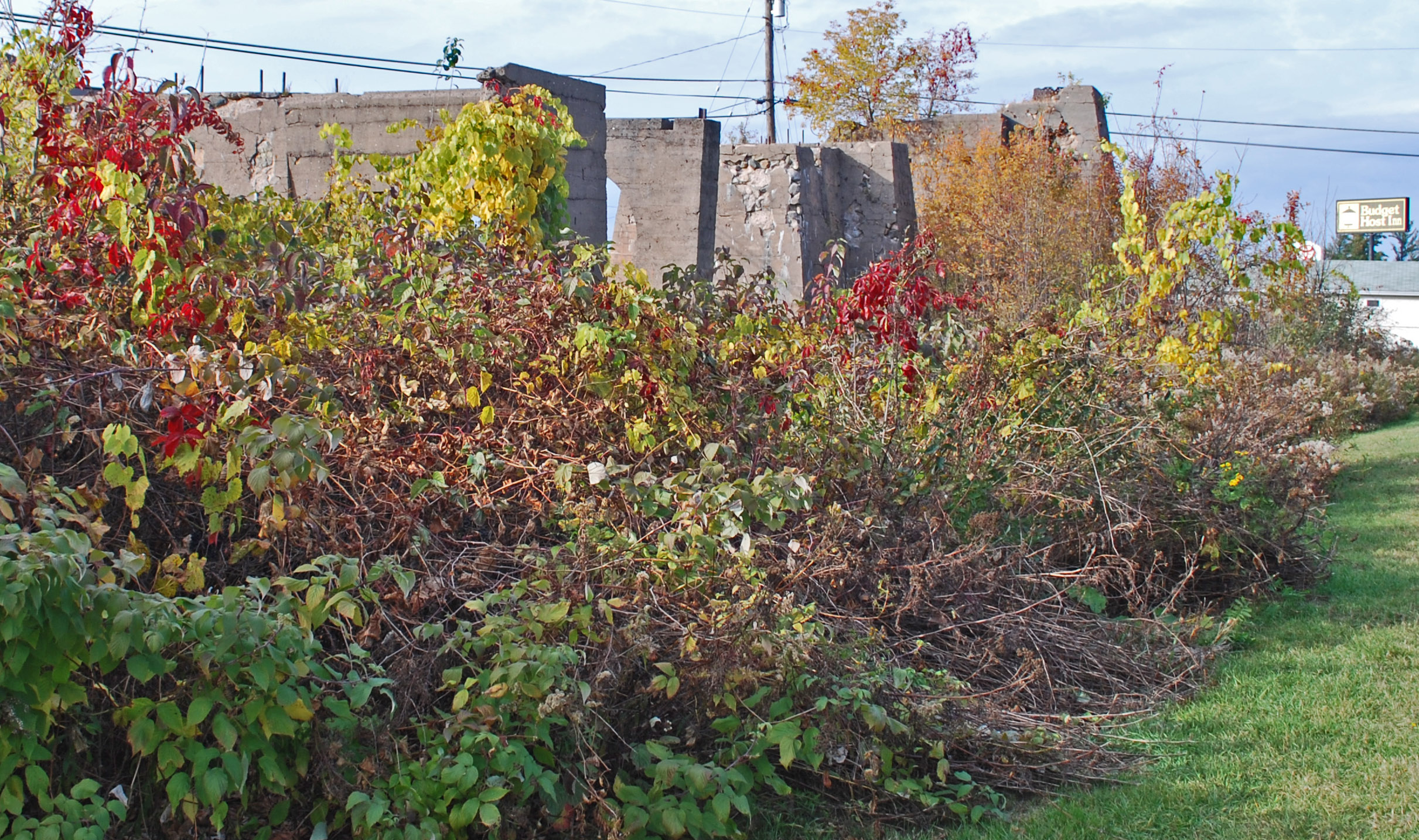

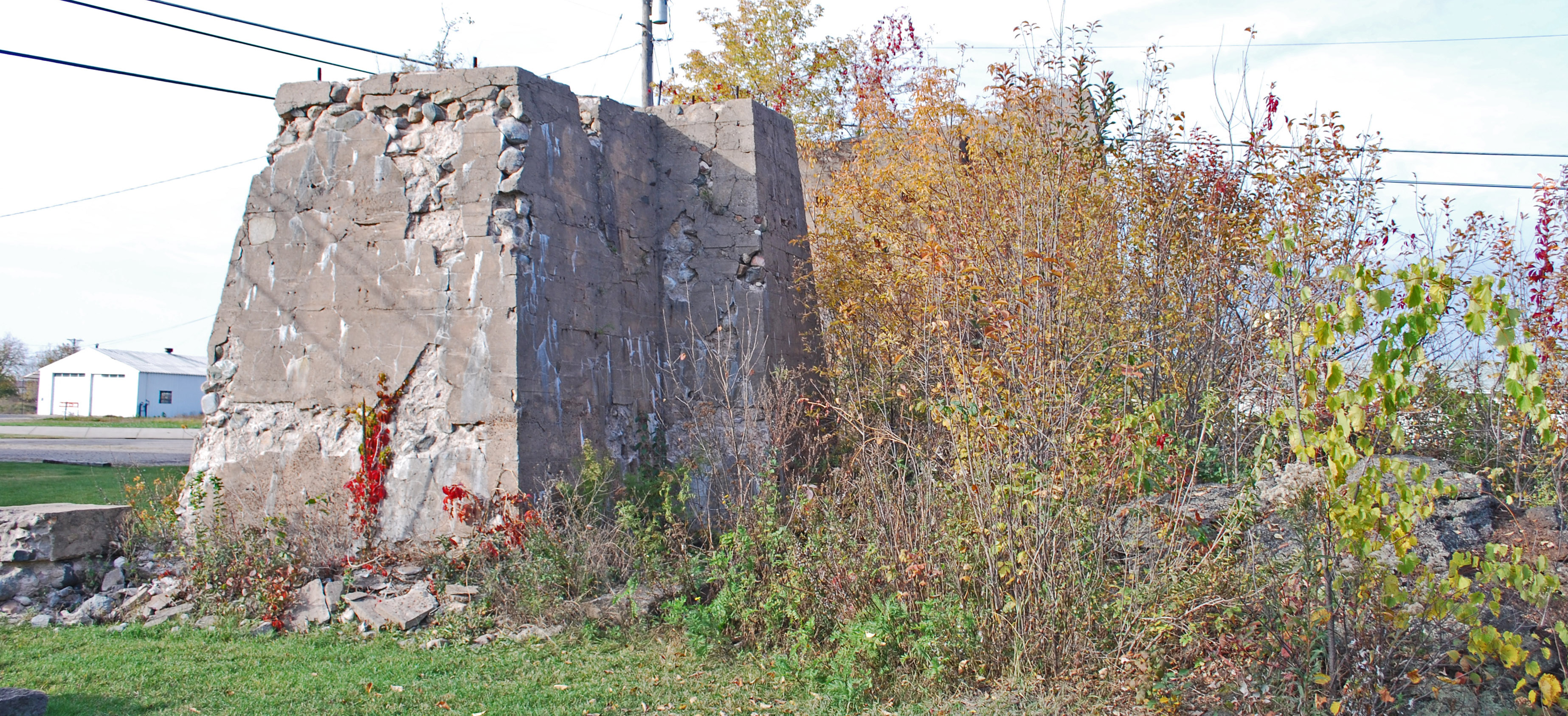

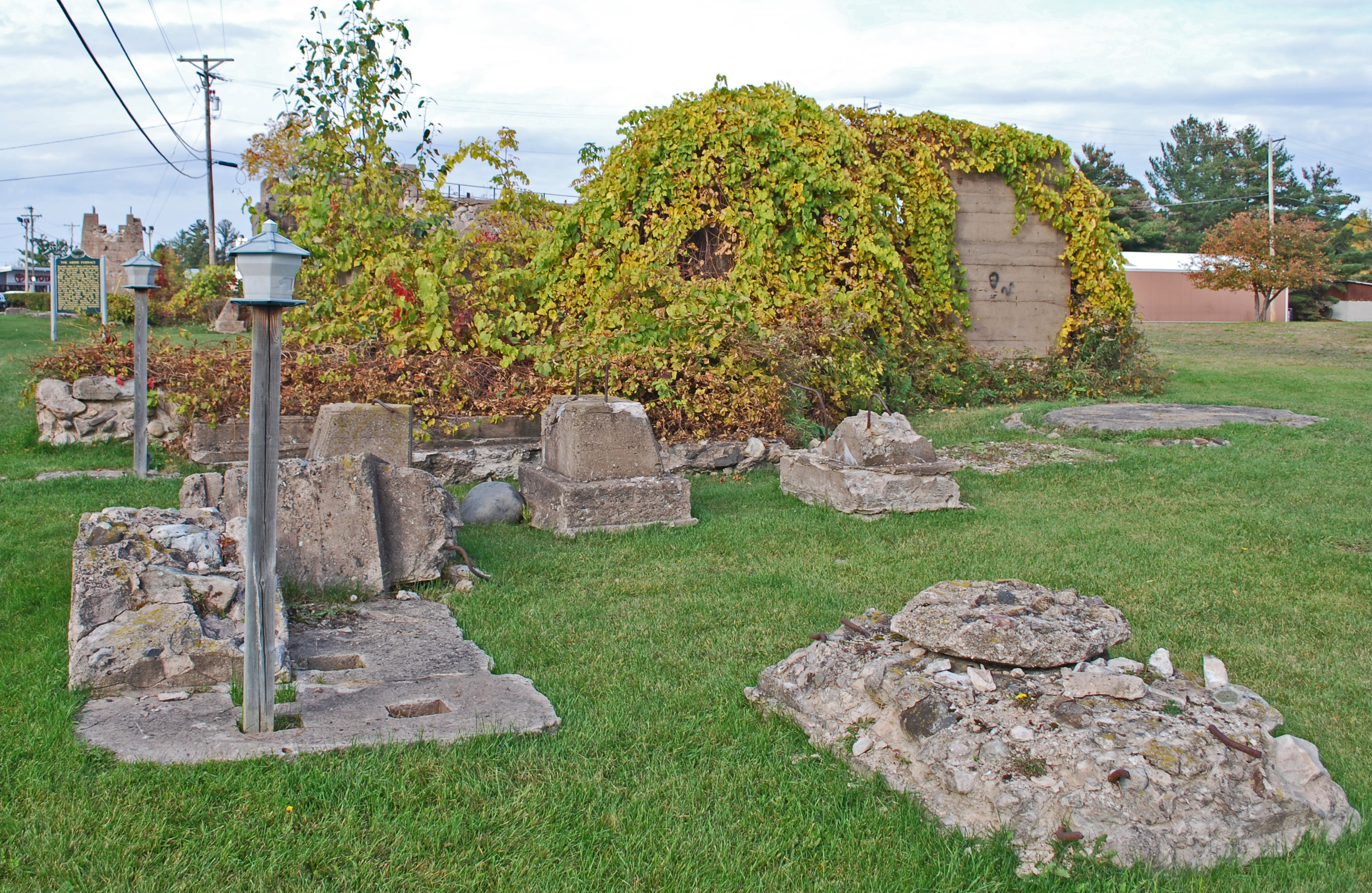

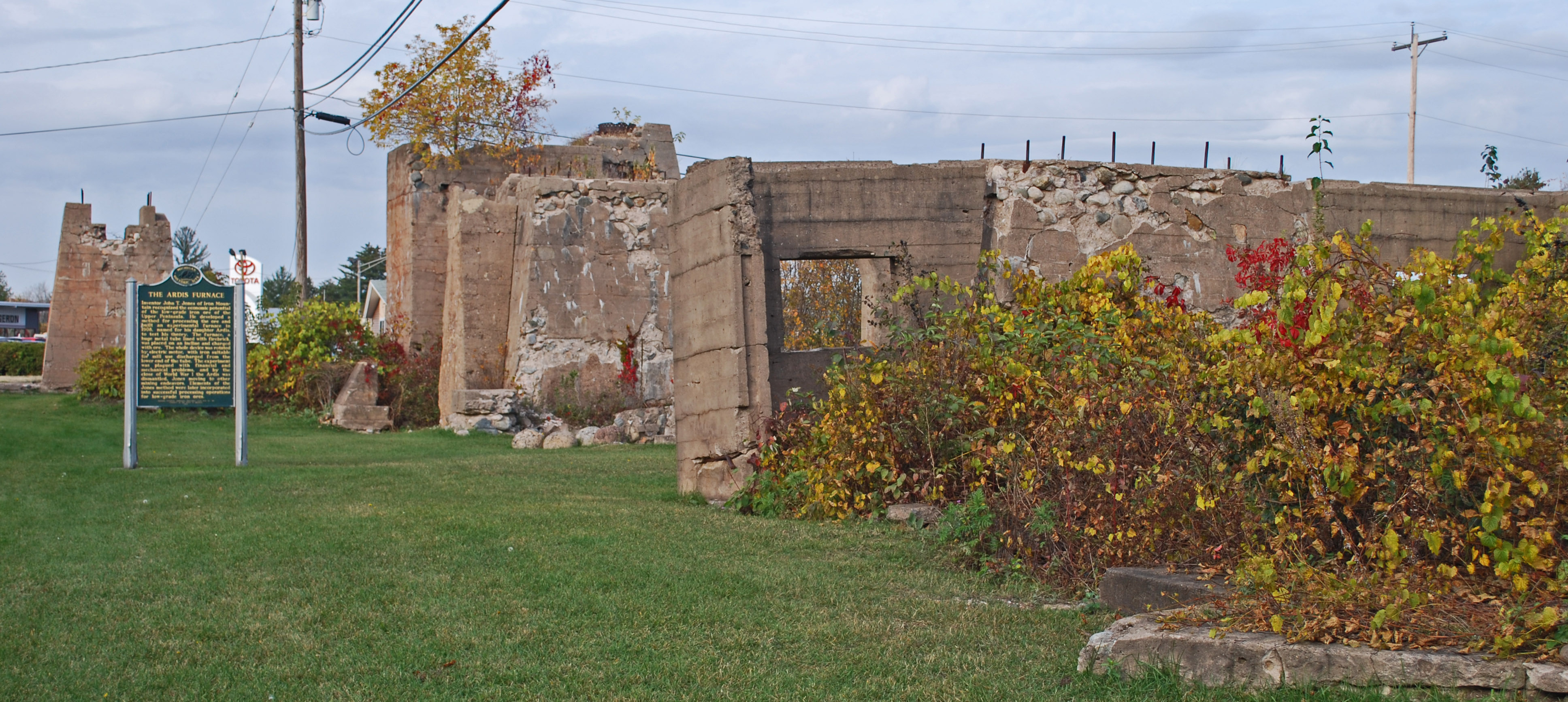

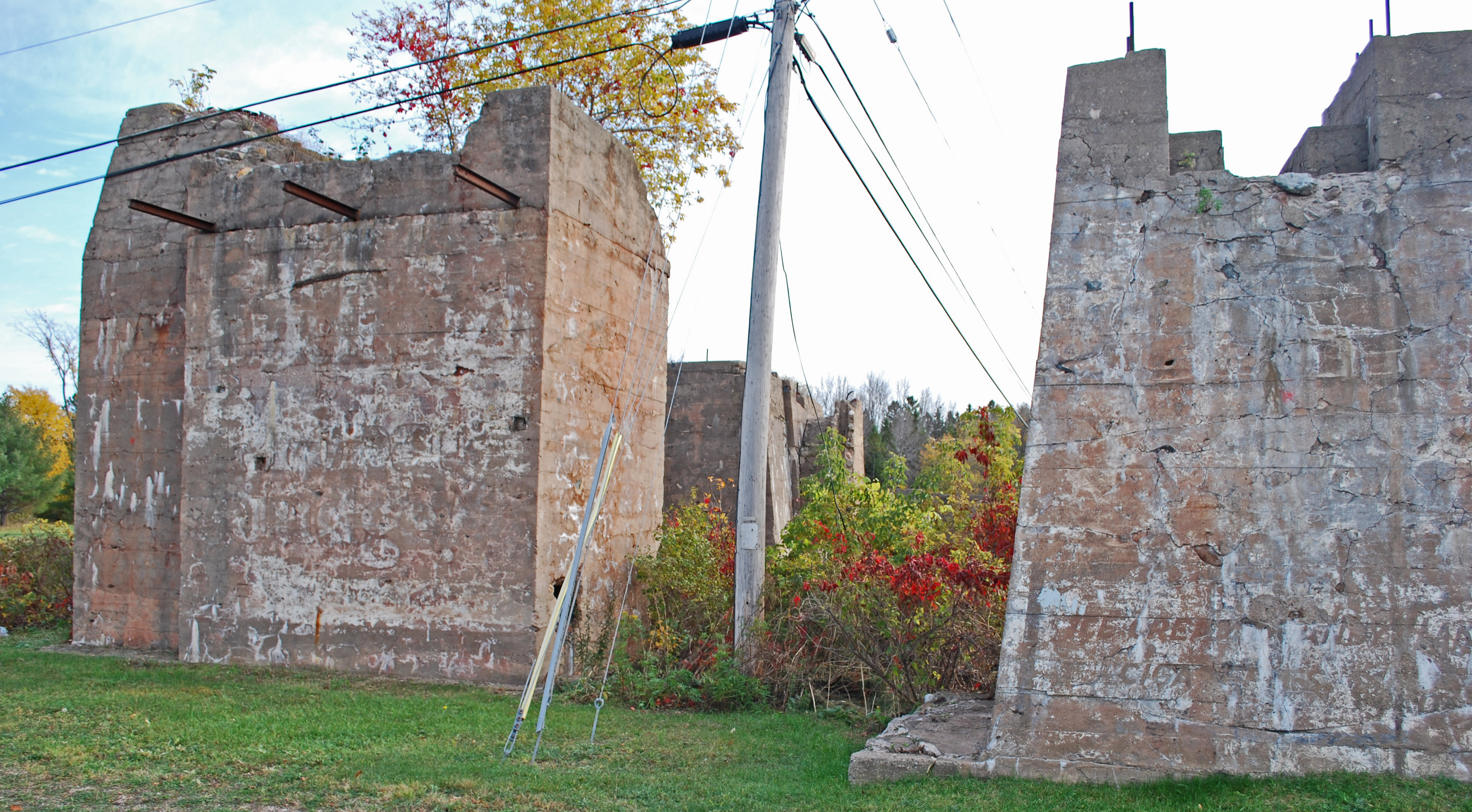
