= Bon Kuh-e Olya =

Bon Kuh-e Olya بنكوه عليا
- Village
- Location within Iran
- Coordinates: 28°42′16″N 57°58′52″E
- Country: Iran
- Province: Kerman
- County: Jiroft
- Bakhsh: Jebalbarez
- Rural District: Rezvan

Population (2006)
  - Total: 17
- Time zone: UTC+3:30 (IRST)

Bon Kuh-e Olya (Persian: بنكوه عليا, also Romanized as Bon Kūh-e ‘Olyā; also known as Bon Kūh-e Bālā and Ponkūh) is a village in Rezvan Rural District, Jebalbarez District, Jiroft County, Kerman Province, Iran. At the 2006 census, its population was 17, in 6 families.
