= Laleh Zar =

Laleh Zar لاله زار
- Village
- Location within Iran
- Coordinates: 33°11′11″N 47°22′03″E
- Country: Iran
- Province: Ilam
- County: Darreh Shahr
- Bakhsh: Central
- Rural District: Zarrin Dasht

Population (2006)
  - Total: 70
- Time zone: UTC+3:30 (IRST)
  - Summer (DST): UTC+4:30 (IRDT)

Laleh Zar (Persian: لاله زار, also Romanized as Lāleh Zār; also known as Ghārat Mālgeh) is a village in Zarrin Dasht Rural District, in the Central District of Darreh Shahr County, Ilam Province, Iran. At the 2006 census, its population was 70, in 12 families. The village is populated by Kurds.
