= Lalehzar, Kerman =

City in Kerman province, Iran

Lalehzar Persian: لاله زار
- City
- Location within Iran
- Coordinates: 29°31′14″N 56°49′08″E
- Country: Iran
- Province: Kerman
- County: Bardsir
- District: Lalehzar

Population (2016)
  - Total: 4,429
- Time zone: UTC+3:30 (IRST)

Lalehzar (Persian: لاله زار) (Note: Also romanized as Lālehzār) is a city in, and the capital of, Lalehzar District in Bardsir County, Kerman province, Iran. It also serves as the administrative center for Lalehzar Rural District.

== Demographics ==
=== Population ===
At the time of the 2006 National Census, Lalehzar's population was 2,933 in 697 households, when it was a village in Lalehzar Rural District. The following census in 2011 counted 2,945 people in 786 households, by which time the village had been elevated to the status of a city. The 2016 census measured the population of the city as 4,429 people in 1,314 households.
