= Ardis (given name) =

Ardis is a female first name of Irish and Scottish origin. Its meaning is fervent or “blooming meadow” as a variation of Ardyce. Notable people with the name include:

- Ardis Fagerholm (born 1971), a Swedish pop singer
- Ardis Joan Krainik (1928 – 1997), an American mezzo-soprano opera singer
