= Golzar, Kerman =

City in Kerman province, Iran

Golzar Persian: گلزار
- City
- Location within Iran
- Coordinates: 29°42′39″N 57°02′22″E
- Country: Iran
- Province: Kerman
- County: Bardsir
- District: Golzar

Population (2016)
  - Total: 5,445
- Time zone: UTC+3:30 (IRST)

Golzar (Persian: گلزار) (Note: Formerly Deh Tazian (ده تازیان), also romanized as Deh Tāzīān, Deh Tāzeyān, and Deh-e Tāzīān; also known as Tāzīān; formerly known as Karīāl ul ‘Arab, Qariāt al Arab, Qarīya-tol-’Arab, Qaryat ol ‘Arab, and Qaryatol ‘Arab (قریه العرب)) is a city in, and the capital of, Golzar District of Bardsir County, Kerman province, Iran. It also serves as the administrative center for Golzar Rural District. (Note: Formerly Qaryah ol Arab Rural District)

== Demographics ==
=== Population ===
At the time of the 2006 National Census, Golzar's population was 6,131 in 1,164 households, when it was in the Central District. The following census in 2011 counted 3,411 people in 916 households, by which time the rural district had been separated from the district in the establishment of Golzar District. The 2016 census measured the population of Golzar as 5,445 people in 1,711 households, when the city had been transferred to Golzar District.
