= Bab-e Kahnuj, Jiroft =

Bab-e Kahnuj بابكهنوج
- Village
- Location within Iran
- Coordinates: 29°18′36″N 57°17′24″E
- Country: Iran
- Province: Kerman
- County: Jiroft
- Bakhsh: Sarduiyeh
- Rural District: Sarduiyeh

Population (2006)
  - Total: 76
- Time zone: UTC+3:30 (IRST)
  - Summer (DST): UTC+4:30 (IRDT)

Bab-e Kahnuj (Persian: بابكهنوج, also Romanized as Bāb-e Kahnūj) is a village in Sarduiyeh Rural District, Sarduiyeh District, Jiroft County, Kerman Province, Iran. At the 2006 census, its population was 76, in 20 families.
