= Ardis, Ottoman Empire =

Ardis was a small town in the Ottoman Empire 35 miles north-west of Diyarbakir. It laid along the Tigris River which was a good way to travel and trade. Dilay Hatun became the head of the town in 1793 after the previous leader died sometime during the Tripolitanian civil war. The town no longer exists due to urbanization in the 1800s.
