= Golzar District =

District in Kerman province, Iran

Golzar District Persian: بخش گلزار
- District
- Location within Iran
- Coordinates: 29°36′51″N 57°04′00″E
- Country: Iran
- Province: Kerman
- County: Bardsir
- Capital: Golzar

Population (2016)
  - Total: 8,271
- Time zone: UTC+3:30 (IRST)

Golzar District (Persian: بخش گلزار) is in Bardsir County, Kerman province, Iran. Its capital is the city of Golzar. (Note: Formerly the village of Qaryah ol Arab)

== History ==
After the 2006 National Census, Golzar Rural District, (Note: Formerly Qaryah ol Arab Rural District) and later the city of Golzar, were separated from the Central District in the establishment of Golzar District.

== Demographics ==
=== Population ===
At the time of the 2011 census, the district's population was 2,473 in 677 households. The 2016 census measured the population of the district as 8,271 inhabitants in 2,561 households.

=== Administrative divisions ===
Golzar District Population
Administrative Divisions	2011	2016
Golzar RD	837	677
Shirinak RD	1,636	2,149
Golzar (city)		5,445
Total	2,473	8,271
RD = Rural District
