= Lalehzar Rural District =

Rural district in Kerman province, Iran

Lalehzar Rural District Persian: دهستان لاله زار
- Rural District
- Location within Iran
- Coordinates: 29°32′14″N 56°51′29″E
- Country: Iran
- Province: Kerman
- County: Bardsir
- District: Lalehzar
- Capital: Lalehzar

Population (2016)
  - Total: 3,239
- Time zone: UTC+3:30 (IRST)

Lalehzar Rural District (Persian: دهستان لاله زار) is in Lalehzar District of Bardsir County, Kerman province, Iran. It is administered from the city of Lalehzar.

== Demographics ==
=== Population ===
At the time of the 2006 National Census, the rural district's population was 5,543 in 1,289 households. There were 2,673 inhabitants in 715 households at the following census of 2011. The 2016 census measured the population of the rural district as 3,239 in 1,047 households. The most populous of its 51 villages was Baghabar, with 2,263 people.
