= Golzar Rural District =

Rural district in Kerman province, Iran

Golzar Rural District Persian: دهستان گلزار
- Rural District
- Location within Iran
- Coordinates: 29°40′58″N 57°03′31″E
- Country: Iran
- Province: Kerman
- County: Bardsir
- District: Golzar
- Capital: Golzar

Population (2016)
  - Total: 677
- Time zone: UTC+3:30 (IRST)

Golzar Rural District (Persian: دهستان گلزار) (Note: Formerly Qaryah ol Arab Rural District (دهستان قریه العرب)) is in Golzar District of Bardsir County, Kerman province, Iran. It is administered from the city of Golzar. (Note: Formerly the village of Qaryah ol Arab)

== Demographics ==
=== Population ===
At the time of the 2006 National Census, the rural district's population (as a part of the Central District) was 3,242 in 706 households. There were 837 inhabitants in 247 households at the following census of 2011, by which time the rural district had been separated from the district in the formation of Golzar District. The 2016 census measured the population of the rural district as 677 in 209 households. The most populous of its 49 villages was Sahebabad, with 227 people.
