= Mashiz Rural District =

Rural district in Kerman province, Iran

Mashiz Rural District Persian: دهستان مشيز
- Rural District
- Location within Iran
- Coordinates: 29°51′03″N 56°31′19″E
- Country: Iran
- Province: Kerman
- County: Bardsir
- District: Central
- Capital: Dashtkar

Population (2016)
  - Total: 7,812
- Time zone: UTC+3:30 (IRST)

Mashiz Rural District (Persian: دهستان مشيز) is in the Central District of Bardsir County, Kerman province, Iran. It is administered from the city of Dashtkar.

== Demographics ==
=== Population ===
At the time of the 2006 National Census, the rural district's population was 18,900 in 4,198 households. There were 8,409 inhabitants in 2,328 households at the following census of 2011. The 2016 census measured the population of the rural district as 7,812 in 2,466 households. The most populous of its 122 villages was Taherabad, with 986 people.
