= Kuhpanj Rural District =

Rural district in Kerman province, Iran

Kuhpanj Rural District Persian: دهستان كوه پنج
- Rural District
- Location within Iran
- Coordinates: 29°58′18″N 56°16′26″E
- Country: Iran
- Province: Kerman
- County: Bardsir
- District: Central
- Capital: Mahunak

Population (2016)
  - Total: 6,040
- Time zone: UTC+3:30 (IRST)

Kuhpanj Rural District (Persian: دهستان كوه پنج) is in the Central District of Bardsir County, Kerman province, Iran. Its capital is the village of Mahunak.

== Demographics ==
=== Population ===
At the time of the 2006 National Census, the rural district's population was 2,898 in 702 households. There were 2,459 inhabitants in 740 households at the following census of 2011. The 2016 census measured the population of the rural district as 6,040 in 1,922 households. The most populous of its 295 villages was Deh-e Larz, with 335 people.
