= Qaleh-ye Asgar Rural District =

Rural district in Kerman province, Iran

Qaleh-ye Asgar Rural District Persian: دهستان قلعه عسگر
- Rural District
- Location within Iran
- Coordinates: 29°32′50″N 56°41′25″E
- Country: Iran
- Province: Kerman
- County: Bardsir
- District: Lalehzar
- Capital: Qaleh-ye Askar

Population (2016)
  - Total: 5,739
- Time zone: UTC+3:30 (IRST)

Qaleh-ye Asgar Rural District (Persian: دهستان قلعه عسگر) is in Lalehzar District of Bardsir County, Kerman province, Iran. Its capital is the village of Qaleh-ye Askar.

== Demographics ==
=== Population ===
At the time of the 2006 National Census, the rural district's population was 3,930 in 938 households. There were 3,144 inhabitants in 961 households at the following census of 2011. The 2016 census measured the population of the rural district as 5,739 in 1,911 households. The most populous of its 83 villages was Kharmandeh, with 799 people.
