= Lalehzar District =

District in Kerman province, Iran

Lalehzar District Persian: بخش لاله‌زار
- District
- Location within Iran
- Coordinates: 29°32′50″N 56°46′26″E
- Country: Iran
- Province: Kerman
- County: Bardsir
- Capital: Lalehzar

Population (2016)
  - Total: 13,407
- Time zone: UTC+3:30 (IRST)

Lalehzar District (Persian: بخش لاله‌زار) is in Bardsir County, Kerman province, Iran. Its capital is the city of Lalehzar.

== History ==
After the 2006 National Census, Lalehzar was elevated to the status of a city.

== Demographics ==
=== Population ===
At the time of the 2006 census, the district's population was 9,473 in 2,227 households. The following census in 2011 counted 8,762 people in 2,462 households. The 2016 census measured the population of the district as 13,407 inhabitants in 4,272 households.

=== Administrative divisions ===
Lalehzar District Population
Administrative Divisions	2006	2011	2016
Lalehzar RD	5,543	2,673	3,239
Qaleh-ye Asgar RD	3,930	3,144	5,739
Lalehzar (city)		2,945	4,429
Total	9,473	8,762	13,407
RD = Rural District
