= Central District (Bardsir County) =

District in Kerman province, Iran

Central District (Bardsir County) Persian: بخش مرکزی شهرستان بردسیر
- District
- Location within Iran
- Coordinates: 29°50′56″N 56°21′49″E
- Country: Iran
- Province: Kerman
- County: Bardsir
- Capital: Bardsir

Population (2016)
  - Total: 42,238
- Time zone: UTC+3:30 (IRST)

The Central District of Bardsir County (Persian: بخش مرکزی شهرستان بردسیر) is in Kerman province, Iran. Its capital is the city of Bardsir.

== History ==
After the 2006 National Census, Golzar Rural District (Note: Formerly Qaryah ol Arab Rural District) and the city of Golzar (Note: Formerly the village of Qaryah ol Arab) were separated from the district in the formation of Golzar District. Negar Rural District and the city of Negar were also separated from the Central District to form Negar District. After the 2011 census, the village of Dashtkar was elevated to the status of a city.

== Demographics ==
=== Population ===
At the time of the 2006 census, the district's population was 75,070 in 51,880 households. The following census in 2011 counted 51,880 people in 13,864 households. The 2016 census measured the population of the district as 42,238 inhabitants in 13,047 households.

=== Administrative divisions ===
Central District (Bardsir County) Population
Administrative Divisions	2006	2011	2016
Golzar RD (Note: Transferred to Golzar District)	3,242		
Kuhpanj RD	2,898	2,459	6,040
Mashiz RD	18,900	8,409	7,812
Negar RD (Note: Transferred to Negar District)	2,807		
Bardsir (city)	31,801	31,870	25,152
Dashtkar (city)			3,234
Golzar (city)	6,131	3,411	
Negar (city)	9,291	5,731	
Total	75,070	51,880	42,238
RD = Rural District
