= Bardsir County =

County in Kerman province, Iran

Bardsir County Persian: شهرستان بردسیر
- County
- Location of Bardsir County in Kerman province (center left, pink)

- Location of Kerman province in Iran
- Coordinates: 29°48′N 56°40′E
- Country: Iran
- Province: Kerman
- Capital: Bardsir
- Districts: Central, Golzar, Lalehzar, Negar

Population (2016)
  - Total: 81,983
- Time zone: UTC+3:30 (IRST)
- Website: web.archive.org/web/20070929031800/http://www.bardsir.gov.ir/%20Official%20website

Bardsir County (Persian: شهرستان بردسیر) is in Kerman province, Iran. Its capital is the city of Bardsir.

== History ==
After the 2006 National Census, Golzar Rural District, (Note: Formerly Qaryah ol Arab Rural District) and later the city of Golzar, (Note: Formerly the village of Qaryah ol Arab) were separated from the Central District in the establishment of Golzar District, including the new Shirinak Rural District. Negar Rural District, and later the city of Negar, were also separated from the Central District to form Negar District, including the new Narp Rural District. The village of Lalehzar was elevated to the status of a city. After the 2011 census, the village of Dashtkar also rose to city status.

== Demographics ==
=== Population ===
At the time of the 2006 census, the county's population was 84,543 in 18,650 households. The following census in 2011 counted 73,738 people in 19,632 households. The 2016 census measured the population of the county as 81,983 in 25,315 households.

=== Administrative divisions ===
Bardsir County's population history and administrative structure over three consecutive censuses are shown in the following table.

Bardsir County Population
| Administrative Divisions | 2006 | 2011 | 2016 |
|---|---|---|---|
| Central District | 75,070 | 51,880 | 42,238 |
| Golzar RD | 3,242 | | |
| Kuhpanj RD | 2,898 | 2,459 | 6,040 |
| Mashiz RD | 18,900 | 8,409 | 7,812 |
| Negar RD | 2,807 | | |
| Bardsir (city) | 31,801 | 31,870 | 25,152 |
| Dashtkar (city) | | | 3,234 |
| Golzar (city) | 6,131 | 3,411 | |
| Negar (city) | 9,291 | 5,731 | |
| Golzar District | | 2,473 | 8,271 |
| Golzar RD | | 837 | 677 |
| Shirinak RD | | 1,636 | 2,149 |
| Golzar (city) | | | 5,445 |
| Lalehzar District | 9,473 | 8,762 | 13,407 |
| Lalehzar RD | 5,543 | 2,673 | 3,239 |
| Qaleh-ye Asgar RD | 3,930 | 3,144 | 5,739 |
| Lalehzar (city) | | 2,945 | 4,429 |
| Negar District | | 8,509 | 17,171 |
| Narp RD | | 6,100 | 6,112 |
| Negar RD | | 2,409 | 3,459 |
| Negar (city) | | | 7,600 |
| Total | 84,543 | 73,738 | 81,983 |
RD = Rural District

== See also ==
Media related to Bardsir County at Wikimedia Commons
