= 2005 Zarand earthquake =

Earthquake in Kerman province, Iran

- UTC time: 2005-02-22 02:25:22
- ISC event: 8007175
- USGS-ANSS: ComCat
- Local date: February 22, 2005
- Local time: 05:55:22 IST (UTC+3:30)
- Magnitude: M_{w} 6.4
- Depth: 15.5 km (10 mi)
- Epicenter: 30.72°N 56.81°E
- Type: Reverse
- Areas affected: Zarand, Ravar and Kerman, Iran
- Total damage: US$80 million (equivalent to $131.9 million in 2025)
- Max. intensity: MMI VIII (Severe)
- Peak acceleration: 0.51 g
- Landslides: Yes
- Aftershocks: 30+ M_{L} 2.0–4.0 (as of 22/02/2005)
- Casualties: 612–799 deaths, 5,000 injuries

A moment magnitude (M_{w}) 6.4 earthquake struck northern Kerman province, Iran on 22 February 2005, at 05:55:22 Iran Standard Time (02:25:22 UTC). At least 612 people were killed and 5,000 more were injured, with most of the fatalities occurring in several rural villages near the epicenter. Thousands of homes were damaged or destroyed, most of them in Zarand County, the earthquake's epicentral location. Fatalities and structural collapses also occurred in nearby Ravar County and the city of Kerman.

== Tectonic setting ==
The Iranian plateau is a broad zone of deformed continental crust as it is wedged between the Arabian and Eurasian plates. The Arabian plate, located southeast of the plateau, undergoes oblique convergence with the Eurasian plate in the northeast at a rate of 22 cm (8.7 in) annually. Deformation of the crust is distributed non-uniformly by the fold and thrust belts of the Zagros, Alborz, and Kopet Dag; oceanic lithosphere subduction along the Makran Trench; and strike-slip and reverse faulting within the plateau. The Iranian plateau itself is divided into rigid tectonic blocks. These crustal blocks are aseismic, but at their boundaries, seismicity is high.

Zarand in Kerman province is close to an active fault, known as the Kuhbanan fault in the north east of the city. Its trend is northwest–southeast and its length is 160 km (99 mi). Zarand has been hit by several earthquakes since 1933. In December 1977, a magnitude 5.9 earthquake struck north of Zarand, killing at least 584 people.

== Earthquake ==
The maximum recorded peak ground acceleration was 0.51 g at Shirinrud dam. The earthquake was followed by about 30 aftershocks measuring M_{L} 2.0–4.0 within about three hours of the mainshock.

== Damage and casualties ==
According to the USGS' PAGER-CAT catalog, the earthquake killed 612 people, while an independent investigation by the Iranian Students' News Agency put the death toll at 799. Across Zarand County, over 8,000 buildings In addition, 5,000 others were injured, most of which were minor. and 20 villages were completely destroyed, while 90% of homes in 40 villages and 50% of homes in 25 others collapsed. In Ravar County, three people were killed and 25-45% of homes in 15 villages were destroyed. Economic losses amounted to US$80 million.

At least 45% of homes in Vahdat and Khanuk Rural Districts were damaged, along with 30% of buildings in Reyhan Shahr. The village of Dahuiyeh was destroyed, with 200 residents dying there, while all homes were destroyed and 337 people were killed in Hotkan, including many after the village's police station and mosque collapsed during early morning prayers. In addition, 50 people were killed after the village of Sar Bagh was razed, while in Bahaabad, 55 fatalities were recorded and 80% of homes collapsed. In the city of Zarand, 23 people died and 30% of buildings were damaged or destroyed. Severe damage occurring to 5 of the 78 health facilities in Zarand County. Seven people were killed in Kerman, with the most significant damage there being collapsed walls.

== Response ==
More than 50 relief teams from the Iranian Red Crescent Society (IRC), consisting of 1,500 staff and volunteers, eight rescue dogs and a government plane from Tehran, carrying relief supplies, including 795 tents, 800 blankets, 100 stretchers and some 600 packages of bread, were dispatched to Kerman province. The IRC also sent 22,363 relief tents, 42,594 blankets, 37,515 plastic cover sheets, 2,856 lanterns, 9,916 heaters, 100 stretchers, 3,574 kitchen sets, 9,600 hygiene kits, 10 ambulances, 4 life detectors, some light and heavy relief vehicles, 1 mobile communication unit and 3,303 kg of bread, along with enough food baskets to feed 30,000 people. Rescue workers faced difficulties while attempting to reach affected villages due to heavy rains and roads being blocked by landslides.

== See also ==
- List of earthquakes in 2005
- List of earthquakes in Iran
- 2003 Bam earthquake
