= Tezerj =

Tezerj or Tazarj or Tezarj (Persian: تذرج) may refer to:

- Tezerj, Hormozgan
- Tezerj, Rabor, Kerman Province
- Tezerj, Shahr-e Babak, Kerman Province
- Tezerj, Sirjan, Kerman Province
- Tezerj, Jorjafak, Zarand County, Kerman Province
- Tezerj, Sarbanan, Zarand County, Kerman Province
