= Badiz =

Badiz باديز
- Village
- Location within Iran
- Coordinates: 30°36′23″N 56°23′37″E
- Country: Iran
- Province: Kerman
- County: Zarand
- Bakhsh: Central
- Rural District: Jorjafak

Population (2006)
  - Total: 103
- Time zone: UTC+3:30 (IRST)
  - Summer (DST): UTC+4:30 (IRDT)

Badiz (Persian: باديز, also Romanized as Bādīz) is a village in Jorjafak Rural District, in the Central District of Zarand County, Kerman Province, Iran. At the 2006 census, its population was 103, in 36 families.
