= Chahkin =

Chahkin چاهكين
- Village
- Location within Iran
- Coordinates: 30°40′47″N 56°17′42″E
- Country: Iran
- Province: Kerman
- County: Zarand
- Bakhsh: Central
- Rural District: Jorjafak

Population (2006)
  - Total: 121
- Time zone: UTC+3:30 (IRST)
  - Summer (DST): UTC+4:30 (IRDT)

Chahkin (Persian: چاهكين, also Romanized as Chāhkīn; also known as Chāh Gīn and Chākīn) is a village in Jorjafak Rural District, in the Central District of Zarand County, Kerman Province, Iran. At the 2006 census, its population was 121, in 40 families.
