= Davarunuiyeh =

Davarunuiyeh داورونوئيه
- Village
- Location within Iran
- Coordinates: 30°39′18″N 56°20′00″E
- Country: Iran
- Province: Kerman
- County: Zarand
- Bakhsh: Central
- Rural District: Jorjafak

Population (2006)
  - Total: 35
- Time zone: UTC+3:30 (IRST)
  - Summer (DST): UTC+4:30 (IRDT)

Davarunuiyeh (Persian: داورونوئيه, also Romanized as Dāvarānū’īyeh and Davaranoo’eyeh; also known as Dābrū’īyeh and Dābrūnū’īyeh) is a village in Jorjafak Rural District, in the Central District of Zarand County, Kerman Province, Iran. At the 2006 census, its population was 35, in 10 families.
