= Gatkuiyeh =

Gatkuiyeh گتكوئيه
- Village
- Location within Iran
- Coordinates: 30°48′04″N 56°42′07″E
- Country: Iran
- Province: Kerman
- County: Zarand
- Bakhsh: Central
- Rural District: Vahdat

Population (2006)
  - Total: 127
- Time zone: UTC+3:30 (IRST)
  - Summer (DST): UTC+4:30 (IRDT)

Gatkuiyeh (Persian: گتكوئيه, also Romanized as Gatkū’īyeh, Gatkoo’eyeh, and Gatkūyeh; also known as Gankū’īyeh, Gatgūyeh and Katkū’īyeh) is a village in Vahdat Rural District, in the Central District of Zarand County, Kerman Province, Iran. At the 2006 census, its population was 127, in 29 families.
