= Deh-e Milan =

Deh-e Milan ده ميلان
- Village
- Location within Iran
- Coordinates: 30°53′22″N 56°48′58″E
- Country: Iran
- Province: Kerman
- County: Zarand
- Bakhsh: Central
- Rural District: Hotkan

Population (2006)
  - Total: 61
- Time zone: UTC+3:30 (IRST)
  - Summer (DST): UTC+4:30 (IRDT)

Deh-e Milan (Persian: ده ميلان, also Romanized as Deh-e Mīlān and Deh Mīlān; also known as Deh Mīlūn) is a village in Hotkan Rural District, in the Central District of Zarand County, Kerman Province, Iran. At the 2006 census, its population was 61, in 19 families.
