= Susefid =

Susefid سوسفيد
- Village
- Location within Iran
- Coordinates: 30°51′12″N 56°49′48″E
- Country: Iran
- Province: Kerman
- County: Zarand
- Bakhsh: Central
- Rural District: Hotkan

Population (2006)
  - Total: 22
- Time zone: UTC+3:30 (IRST)
  - Summer (DST): UTC+4:30 (IRDT)

Susefid (Persian: سوسفيد, also Romanized as Sūsefīd) is a village in Hotkan Rural District, in the Central District of Zarand County, Kerman Province, Iran. At the 2006 census, its population was 22, in 10 families.
