= Hashish, Iran =

Hashish حشيش
- Village
- Location within Iran
- Coordinates: 30°44′51″N 56°06′14″E
- Country: Iran
- Province: Kerman
- County: Zarand
- Bakhsh: Central
- Rural District: Jorjafak

Population (2006)
  - Total: 47
- Time zone: UTC+3:30 (IRST)
  - Summer (DST): UTC+4:30 (IRDT)

Hashish (Persian: حشيش, also Romanized as Ḩashīsh) is a village in Jorjafak Rural District, in the Central District of Zarand County, Kerman Province, Iran. At the 2006 census, its population was 47, in 16 families.
