= Hamsij =

Hamsij هم سيج
- Village
- Location within Iran
- Coordinates: 30°56′23″N 55°56′54″E
- Country: Iran
- Province: Kerman
- County: Zarand
- Bakhsh: Yazdanabad
- Rural District: Siriz

Population (2006)
  - Total: 57
- Time zone: UTC+3:30 (IRST)
  - Summer (DST): UTC+4:30 (IRDT)

Hamsij (Persian: هم سيج, also Romanized as Hamsīj; also known as Ham Sheykh and Hamsīch) is a village in Siriz Rural District, Yazdanabad District, Zarand County, Kerman Province, Iran. At the 2006 census, its population was 57, in 14 families.
