= Rahmatabad-e Deh-e Aqayi =

Rahmatabad-e Deh-e Aqayi رحمت ابادده اقائي
- Village
- Location within Iran
- Coordinates: 30°53′19″N 56°05′35″E
- Country: Iran
- Province: Kerman
- County: Zarand
- Bakhsh: Yazdanabad
- Rural District: Siriz

Population (2006)
  - Total: 58
- Time zone: UTC+3:30 (IRST)
  - Summer (DST): UTC+4:30 (IRDT)

Rahmatabad-e Deh-e Aqayi (Persian: رحمت ابادده اقائي, also Romanized as Raḩmatābād-e Deh-e Āqāyī; also known as Raḩmatābād and Rahmat Abad Siriz) is a village in Siriz Rural District, Yazdanabad District, Zarand County, Kerman Province, Iran. At the 2006 census, its population was 58, in 13 families.
