= Bonan =

Bonan, or Bao'an may refer to:

- Bonan people
  - Bonan language

Places

- Bonan, Iran
- Bönan, Sweden

See also

- Jishishan Bonan, Dongxiang and Salar Autonomous County, China
- Isaabad-e Sar Bonan, Iran

People

- Edmond Bonan (born 1937), French mathematician
- Heiko Bonan (born 1966), football coach
- Marcelo Bonan (born 1981), Brazilian footballer
- Narcisse Bonan (born 1984), Ivorian footballer

== See also ==
- Bao'an (disambiguation)
