= Darkhiz =

Darkhiz درخيز
- Village
- Location within Iran
- Coordinates: 30°39′31″N 56°18′31″E
- Country: Iran
- Province: Kerman
- County: Zarand
- Bakhsh: Central
- Rural District: Jorjafak

Population (2006)
  - Total: 81
- Time zone: UTC+3:30 (IRST)
  - Summer (DST): UTC+4:30 (IRDT)

Darkhiz (Persian: درخيز, also Romanized as Darkhīz; also known as Bāb-e Havīz, Bāb Hariz, Bāb Havīz, and Darkhīz Bāb Havīz) is a village in Jorjafak Rural District, in the Central District of Zarand County, Kerman Province, Iran. At the 2006 census, its population was 81, in 21 families.
