= Fathabad-e Yazdanabad =

Fathabad-e Yazdanabad فتح اباديزدان اباد
- Village
- Location within Iran
- Coordinates: 30°51′56″N 56°18′03″E
- Country: Iran
- Province: Kerman
- County: Zarand
- Bakhsh: Yazdanabad
- Rural District: Yazdanabad

Population (2006)
  - Total: 988
- Time zone: UTC+3:30 (IRST)
  - Summer (DST): UTC+4:30 (IRDT)

Fathabad-e Yazdanabad (Persian: فتح اباديزدان اباد, also Romanized as Fatḩābād-e Yazdānābād; also known as Fatḩābād) is a village in Yazdanabad Rural District, Yazdanabad District, Zarand County, Kerman Province, Iran. At the 2006 census, its population was 988, in 226 families.
