= Arjomandiyeh =

Arjomandiyeh ارجمنديه
- Village
- Location within Iran
- Coordinates: 30°42′44″N 56°36′27″E
- Country: Iran
- Province: Kerman
- County: Zarand
- Bakhsh: Central
- Rural District: Vahdat

Population (2006)
  - Total: 527
- Time zone: UTC+3:30 (IRST)
  - Summer (DST): UTC+4:30 (IRDT)

Arjomandiyeh (Persian: ارجمنديه, also Romanized as Arjomandīyeh) is a village in Vahdat Rural District, in the Central District of Zarand County, Kerman Province, Iran. At the 2006 census, its population was 527, in 129 families.
