= Sharifabad, Zarand =

Sharifabad شريف اباد
- Village
- Location within Iran
- Coordinates: 30°51′32″N 56°17′56″E
- Country: Iran
- Province: Kerman
- County: Zarand
- Bakhsh: Yazdanabad
- Rural District: Yazdanabad

Population (2006)
  - Total: 101
- Time zone: UTC+3:30 (IRST)
  - Summer (DST): UTC+4:30 (IRDT)

Sharifabad (Persian: شريف اباد, also Romanized as Sharīfābād) is a village in Yazdanabad Rural District, Yazdanabad District, Zarand County, Kerman Province, Iran. At the 2006 census, its population was 101, in 27 families.
