= Hosenabad-e Pain =

Hosenabad-e Pain حصن ابادپائين
- Village
- Location within Iran
- Coordinates: 30°48′57″N 56°22′52″E
- Country: Iran
- Province: Kerman
- County: Zarand
- Bakhsh: Yazdanabad
- Rural District: Yazdanabad

Population (2006)
  - Total: 562
- Time zone: UTC+3:30 (IRST)
  - Summer (DST): UTC+4:30 (IRDT)

Hosenabad-e Pain (Persian: حصن ابادپائين, also Romanized as Ḩoşenābād-e Pā’īn; also known as Ḩoseynābād, Ḩoseynābād-e Jahāngīrkhān, Ḩoseynābād Jahāngīr Khān, and Husainābād) is a village in Yazdanabad Rural District, Yazdanabad District, Zarand County, Kerman Province, Iran. At the 2006 census, its population was 562, in 133 families.
