= Bonuiyeh =

Bonuiyeh بونوييه
- Village
- Location within Iran
- Coordinates: 30°55′13″N 56°38′33″E
- Country: Iran
- Province: Kerman
- County: Zarand
- Bakhsh: Central
- Rural District: Sarbanan

Population (2006)
  - Total: 14
- Time zone: UTC+3:30 (IRST)
  - Summer (DST): UTC+4:30 (IRDT)

Bonuiyeh (Persian: بونوييه, also Romanized as Bonūīyeh and Bonūeeyeh) is a village in Sarbanan Rural District, in the Central District of Zarand County, Kerman Province, Iran. At the 2006 census, its population was 14, in 5 families.
