= Chenalu, Zarand =

Chenalu چنالو
- Village
- Location within Iran
- Coordinates: 30°44′10″N 56°51′11″E
- Country: Iran
- Province: Kerman
- County: Zarand
- Bakhsh: Central
- Rural District: Eslamabad

Population (2006)
  - Total: 14
- Time zone: UTC+3:30 (IRST)
  - Summer (DST): UTC+4:30 (IRDT)

Chenalu (Persian: چنالو, also Romanized as Chenālū) is a village in Eslamabad Rural District, in the Central District of Zarand County, Kerman Province, Iran. At the 2006 census, its population was 14, in four families.
