= Shahrokhabad, Zarand =

Shahrokhabad شاهرخ اباد
- Village
- Location within Iran
- Coordinates: 30°49′49″N 56°22′31″E
- Country: Iran
- Province: Kerman
- County: Zarand
- Bakhsh: Yazdanabad
- Rural District: Yazdanabad

Population (2006)
  - Total: 20
- Time zone: UTC+3:30 (IRST)
  - Summer (DST): UTC+4:30 (IRDT)

Shahrokhabad (Persian: شاهرخ اباد, also Romanized as Shāhrokhābād; also known as Shūrokhābād) is a village in Yazdanabad Rural District, Yazdanabad District, Zarand County, Kerman Province, Iran. At the 2006 census, its population was 20, in 4 families.
