= Pishkesh =

Pishkesh پيشكش
- Village
- Location within Iran
- Coordinates: 30°36′12″N 56°23′32″E
- Country: Iran
- Province: Kerman
- County: Zarand
- Bakhsh: Central
- Rural District: Jorjafak

Population (2006)
  - Total: 42
- Time zone: UTC+3:30 (IRST)
  - Summer (DST): UTC+4:30 (IRDT)

Pishkesh (Persian: پيشكش, also Romanized as Pīshkesh) is a village in Jorjafak Rural District, in the Central District of Zarand County, Kerman Province, Iran. At the 2006 census, its population was 42, in 15 families.
