= Hosenabad-e Bala =

Hosenabad-e Bala حصن ابادبالا
- Village
- Location within Iran
- Coordinates: 30°51′30″N 56°26′17″E
- Country: Iran
- Province: Kerman
- County: Zarand
- Bakhsh: Yazdanabad
- Rural District: Yazdanabad

Population (2006)
  - Total: 61
- Time zone: UTC+3:30 (IRST)
  - Summer (DST): UTC+4:30 (IRDT)

Hosenabad-e Bala (Persian: حصن ابادبالا, also Romanized as Ḩoşenābād-e Bālā; also known as Ḩoseynābād-e Rāḩatābād) is a village in Yazdanabad Rural District, Yazdanabad District, Zarand County, Kerman Province, Iran. At the 2006 census, its population was 61, in 15 families.
