= Sarvedan =

Sarvedan سرودان
- Village
- Location within Iran
- Coordinates: 30°52′36″N 56°51′12″E
- Country: Iran
- Province: Kerman
- County: Zarand
- Bakhsh: Central
- Rural District: Hotkan

Population (2006)
  - Total: 32
- Time zone: UTC+3:30 (IRST)
  - Summer (DST): UTC+4:30 (IRDT)

Sarvedan (Persian: سرودان, also Romanized as Sarvedān; also known as Sar Dūn, Sar-e Dūn, Sarv Dān, and Sarverān) is a village in Hotkan Rural District, in the Central District of Zarand County, Kerman Province, Iran. At the 2006 census, its population was 32, in 8 families.
