= Khunag =

Khunag خونگ
- Village
- Location within Iran
- Coordinates: 30°55′24″N 56°44′31″E
- Country: Iran
- Province: Kerman
- County: Zarand
- Bakhsh: Central
- Rural District: Sarbanan

Population (2006)
  - Total: 15
- Time zone: UTC+3:30 (IRST)
  - Summer (DST): UTC+4:30 (IRDT)

Khunag (Persian: خونگ, also Romanized as Khūnag; also known as Khonak, Khonk, and Khoonak) is a village in Sarbanan Rural District, in the Central District of Zarand County, Kerman Province, Iran. At the 2006 census, its population was 15, in 7 families.
