= Fathabad, Yazdanabad =

Neighborhood in Kerman province, Iran

Fathabad Persian: فتح اباد
- Neighborhood
- Location within Iran
- Coordinates: 31°00′32″N 55°58′30″E
- Country: Iran
- Province: Kerman
- County: Zarand
- District: Yazdanabad
- City: Siriz

Population (2016)
  - Total: 944
- Time zone: UTC+3:30 (IRST)

Fathabad (Persian: فتح اباد) (Note: Also romanized as Fatḩābād) is a neighborhood in the city of Siriz in Yazdanabad District of Zarand County, Kerman province, Iran.

== Demographics ==
=== Population ===
At the time of the 2006 National Census, Fathabad's population was 923 in 222 households, when it was a village in Siriz Rural District. The following census in 2011 counted 954 people in 259 households. The 2016 census measured the population of the village as 944 people in 276 households.

In 2019, the village of Siriz merged with the villages of Deh-e Bala, Deh-e Khvajeh, Deh-e Now, Fathabad, and Muruiyeh to become a city.
