= Naimabad, Zarand =

Naimabad نعيم اباد
- Village
- Location within Iran
- Coordinates: 30°50′38″N 56°30′21″E
- Country: Iran
- Province: Kerman
- County: Zarand
- Bakhsh: Yazdanabad
- Rural District: Yazdanabad

Population (2006)
  - Total: 910
- Time zone: UTC+3:30 (IRST)
  - Summer (DST): UTC+4:30 (IRDT)

Naimabad (Persian: نعيم اباد, also Romanized as Na‘īmābād; also known as Nahīmābād) is a village in Yazdanabad Rural District, Yazdanabad District, Zarand County, Kerman Province, Iran. At the 2006 census, its population was 910, in 235 families.
