= Deh-e Zuiyeh =

Deh-e Zuiyeh ده زوييه
- Village
- Location within Iran
- Coordinates: 30°58′13″N 56°31′45″E
- Country: Iran
- Province: Kerman
- County: Zarand
- Bakhsh: Central
- Rural District: Sarbanan

Population (2006)
  - Total: 53
- Time zone: UTC+3:30 (IRST)
  - Summer (DST): UTC+4:30 (IRDT)

Deh-e Zuiyeh (Persian: ده زوييه, also Romanized as Deh-e Zū’īyeh, Deh Zū’īyeh, Deh-e Zūyeh, and Deh Zoo’eyeh; also known as Deh-e Zū) is a village in Sarbanan Rural District, in the Central District of Zarand County, Kerman Province, Iran. At the 2006 census, its population was 53, in 21 families.
