= Bab Sukhtegan =

Bab Sukhtegan باب سوختگان
- Village
- Location within Iran
- Coordinates: 30°54′31″N 56°43′27″E
- Country: Iran
- Province: Kerman
- County: Zarand
- Bakhsh: Central
- Rural District: Sarbanan

Population (2006)
  - Total: 11
- Time zone: UTC+3:30 (IRST)
  - Summer (DST): UTC+4:30 (IRDT)

Bab Sukhtegan (Persian: باب سوختگان, also Romanized as Bāb Sūkhtegān and Bābsūkhtegān) is a village in Sarbanan Rural District, in the Central District of Zarand County, Kerman Province, Iran. At the 2006 census, its population was 11, in 4 families.
