= Madbun =

Madbun مدبون
- Village
- Location within Iran
- Coordinates: 30°54′17″N 56°50′45″E
- Country: Iran
- Province: Kerman
- County: Zarand
- Bakhsh: Central
- Rural District: Hotkan

Population (2006)
  - Total: 84
- Time zone: UTC+3:30 (IRST)
  - Summer (DST): UTC+4:30 (IRDT)

Madbun (Persian: مدبون, also Romanized as Madbūn; also known as Madban and Madyoon) is a village in Hotkan Rural District, in the Central District of Zarand County, Kerman Province, Iran. At the 2006 census, its population was 84, in 29 families.
