= Deh-e Khvajeh, Zarand =

Neighborhood in Kerman province, Iran

Deh-e Khvajeh Persian: ده خواجه
- Neighborhood
- Location within Iran
- Coordinates: 31°01′21″N 55°58′04″E
- Country: Iran
- Province: Kerman
- County: Zarand
- District: Yazdanabad
- City: Siriz

Population (2016)
  - Total: 570
- Time zone: UTC+3:30 (IRST)

Deh-e Khvajeh (Persian: ده خواجه) (Note: Also romanized as Deh Khvājeh; also known as Deh Khājeh and Deh Khvājā) is a neighborhood in the city of Siriz in Yazdanabad District of Zarand County, Kerman province, Iran.

== Demographics ==
=== Population ===
At the time of the 2006 National Census, Deh-e Khvajeh's population was 552 in 134 households, when it was a village in Siriz Rural District. The following census in 2011 counted 480 people in 145 households. The 2016 census measured the population of the village as 570 people in 196 households.

In 2019, the village of Siriz merged with the villages of Deh-e Bala, Deh-e Khvajeh, Deh-e Now, Fathabad, and Muruiyeh to become a city.
