= Deh-e Bala, Zarand =

Neighborhood in Kerman province, Iran

Deh-e Bala Persian: ده بالا
- Neighborhood
- Location within Iran
- Coordinates: 31°00′50″N 55°58′03″E
- Country: Iran
- Province: Kerman
- County: Zarand
- District: Yazdanabad
- City: Siriz

Population (2016)
  - Total: 257
- Time zone: UTC+3:30 (IRST)

Deh-e Bala (Persian: ده بالا) (Note: Also romanized as Deh-eh Bālā and Dehbālā) is a neighborhood in the city of Siriz in Yazdanabad District of Zarand County, Kerman province, Iran.

== Demographics ==
=== Population ===
At the time of the 2006 National Census, Deh-e Bala's population was 209 in 51 households, when it was a village in Siriz Rural District. The following census in 2011 counted 230 people in 62 households. The 2016 census measured the population of the village as 257 people in 71 households.

In 2019, the village of Siriz merged with the villages of Deh-e Bala, Deh-e Khvajeh, Deh-e Now, Fathabad, and Muruiyeh to become a city.
