= Bab Tangal, Iran =

Bab Tangal باب تنگل
- Village
- Location within Iran
- Coordinates: 30°55′15″N 56°34′55″E
- Country: Iran
- Province: Kerman
- County: Zarand
- Bakhsh: Central
- Rural District: Vahdat

Population (2006)
  - Total: 1,839
- Time zone: UTC+3:30 (IRST)
  - Summer (DST): UTC+4:30 (IRDT)

Bab Tangal (Persian: باب تنگل, also Romanized as Bāb Tangal; also known as Bāb-e Tangal Qadamgāh, Bāb Tangal-e ‘Olyā, Bāb Tangal-e Qadamgāh, Bab Tankal Ghadamgah, Dareh-e Tangal, Dar Tangal (Persian: درتنگل), Dar Tangal-e Qadamgāh, and Dar Tangol) is a village in Vahdat Rural District, in the Central District of Zarand County, Kerman Province, Iran. At the 2006 census, its population was 1,839, in 449 families.
