= Qanat ol Bashar =

Qanat ol Bashar قناتالبشر
- Village
- Location within Iran
- Coordinates: 31°00′22″N 56°38′56″E
- Country: Iran
- Province: Kerman
- County: Zarand
- Bakhsh: Central
- Rural District: Sarbanan

Population (2006)
  - Total: 126
- Time zone: UTC+3:30 (IRST)
  - Summer (DST): UTC+4:30 (IRDT)

Qanat ol Bashar (Persian: قناتالبشر, also Romanized as Qanāt ol Bashar; also known as Kamshīr) is a village in Sarbanan Rural District, in the Central District of Zarand County, Kerman Province, Iran. At the 2006 census, its population was 126, in 32 families.
