= Banavand =

Banavand بناوند
- Village
- Location within Iran
- Coordinates: 30°33′56″N 56°24′29″E
- Country: Iran
- Province: Kerman
- County: Zarand
- Bakhsh: Central
- Rural District: Jorjafak

Population (2006)
  - Total: 123
- Time zone: UTC+3:30 (IRST)
  - Summer (DST): UTC+4:30 (IRDT)

Banavand (Persian: بناوند, also Romanized as Banāvand) is a village in Jorjafak Rural District, in the Central District of Zarand County, Kerman Province, Iran. At the 2006 census, its population was 123, in 49 families.
