= Sarapardeh =

Sarapardeh سراپرده
- village
- Location within Iran
- Coordinates: 30°56′26″N 56°42′37″E
- Country: Iran
- Province: Kerman
- County: Zarand
- Bakhsh: Central
- Rural District: Sarbanan
- Elevation: 2,100 m (6,900 ft)

Population (2006)
  - Total: 46
- Time zone: UTC+3:30 (IRST)
  - Summer (DST): UTC+4:30 (IRDT)

Sarapardeh (Persian: سراپرده) is a tourism village in Sarbanan Rural District, in the Central District of Zarand County, north of Kerman Province, center of Iran. The old plantain of Sarapardeh is very big and is one of the things that is amazing for every tourist; it has 1500 years old (According to the elders of the village). There is a coal mine near this village that called Sarapardeh coal mine (Persian: معدن زغالسنگ سراپرده) and it is still active. At the 2016 census, its population was 62.
