= Mohammadabad-e Golshan =

Mohammadabad Golshan محمدابادگلشن
- Village
- Location within Iran
- Coordinates: 30°51′23″N 56°28′21″E
- Country: Iran
- Province: Kerman
- County: Zarand
- Bakhsh: Yazdanabad
- Rural District: Yazdanabad

Population (2006)
  - Total: 24
- Time zone: UTC+3:30 (IRST)
  - Summer (DST): UTC+4:30 (IRDT)

Mohammadabad Golshan (Persian: محمدابادگلشن, also Romanized as Moḩammadābād Golshan) is a village in Yazdanabad Rural District, Yazdanabad District, Zarand County, Kerman Province, Iran. At the 2006 census, its population was 24, in 8 families.
