= Dargar-e Babgohar =

Village in Iran

Dar-e-Gor (Babgohar) درگر باب گهر
- Village
- Location within Iran
- Coordinates: 30°52′51″N 56°45′59″E
- Country: Iran
- Province: Kerman
- County: Zarand
- Bakhsh: Central
- Rural District: Hotkan

Population (2006)
  - Total: 91
- Time zone: UTC+3:30 (IRST)
  - Summer (DST): UTC+4:30 (IRDT)

Dar-e-Gor (Babgohar) (Persian: درگر باب گهر, also Romanized as Dar-e-Gor (Babgohar); also known as Bābgohar) is a village in Hotkan Rural District, in the Central District of Zarand County, Kerman Province, Iran. At the 2006 census, its population was 91, in 37 families.
