= Muruiyeh, Zarand =

Neighborhood in Kerman province, Iran

Muruiyeh Persian: موروييه
- Neighborhood
- Location within Iran
- Coordinates: 31°01′25″N 55°57′43″E
- Country: Iran
- Province: Kerman
- County: Zarand
- District: Yazdanabad
- City: Siriz

Population (2016)
  - Total: 537
- Time zone: UTC+3:30 (IRST)

Muruiyeh (Persian: موروييه) (Note: Also romanized as Mūrū’īyeh; also known as Mooroo’eyeh Siriz, Morū, Mowrū, and Muru) is a neighborhood in the city of Siriz in Yazdanabad District of Zarand County, Kerman province, Iran.

== Demographics ==
=== Population ===
At the time of the 2006 National Census, Muruiyeh's population was 590 in 145 households, when it was a village in Siriz Rural District. The following census in 2011 counted 582 people in 165 households. The 2016 census measured the population of the village as 537 people in 162 households.

In 2019, the village of Siriz merged with the villages of Deh-e Bala, Deh-e Khvajeh, Deh-e Now, Fathabad, and Muruiyeh to become a city.
