= Bab Duri =

Bab Duri باب دوري
- Village
- Location within Iran
- Coordinates: 31°03′08″N 56°33′30″E
- Country: Iran
- Province: Kerman
- County: Zarand
- Bakhsh: Central
- Rural District: Dasht-e Khak

Population (2006)
  - Total: 106
- Time zone: UTC+3:30 (IRST)
  - Summer (DST): UTC+4:30 (IRDT)

Bab Duri (Persian: باب دوري, also Romanized as Bāb Dūrī) is a village in Dasht-e Khak Rural District, in the Central District of Zarand County, Kerman Province, Iran. At the 2006 census, its population was 106, in 26 families.
