= Nedanamuiyeh =

Nedanamuiyeh ندانموييه
- Village
- Location within Iran
- Coordinates: 30°37′20″N 56°20′07″E
- Country: Iran
- Province: Kerman
- County: Zarand
- Bakhsh: Central
- Rural District: Jorjafak

Population (2006)
  - Total: 10
- Time zone: UTC+3:30 (IRST)
  - Summer (DST): UTC+4:30 (IRDT)

Nedanamuiyeh (Persian: ندانموييه, also Romanized as Nedānamūīyeh; also known as Nedenū’īyeh, Nūdūnū, and Zedenū’īyeh) is a village in Jorjafak Rural District, in the Central District of Zarand County, Kerman Province, Iran. At the 2006 census, its population was 10, in 4 families.
