= Fathabad-e Shur =

Fathabad-e Shur فتح اباد شور
- Village
- Location within Iran
- Coordinates: 30°49′34″N 56°26′59″E
- Country: Iran
- Province: Kerman
- County: Zarand
- Bakhsh: Yazdanabad
- Rural District: Yazdanabad

Population (2006)
  - Total: 37
- Time zone: UTC+3:30 (IRST)
  - Summer (DST): UTC+4:30 (IRDT)

Fathabad-e Shur (Persian: فتح اباد شور, also Romanized as Fatḩābād-e Shūr; also known as Fatḩābād) is a village in Yazdanabad Rural District, Yazdanabad District, Zarand County, Kerman Province, Iran. At the 2006 census, its population was 37, in 10 families.
