= Sorkh Bid =

Sorkh Bid سرخ بيد
- Village
- Location within Iran
- Coordinates: 31°00′36″N 56°36′00″E
- Country: Iran
- Province: Kerman
- County: Zarand
- Bakhsh: Central
- Rural District: Sarbanan

Population (2006)
  - Total: 38
- Time zone: UTC+3:30 (IRST)
  - Summer (DST): UTC+4:30 (IRDT)

Sorkh Bid (Persian: سرخ بيد, also Romanized as Sorkh Bīd) is a village in Sarbanan Rural District, in the Central District of Zarand County, Kerman Province, Iran. At the 2006 census, its population was 38, in 10 families.
