= Shahrdan =

Shahrdan شهردان
- Village
- Location within Iran
- Coordinates: 30°33′13″N 56°24′11″E
- Country: Iran
- Province: Kerman
- County: Zarand
- Bakhsh: Central
- Rural District: Jorjafak

Population (2006)
  - Total: 30
- Time zone: UTC+3:30 (IRST)
  - Summer (DST): UTC+4:30 (IRDT)

Shahrdan (Persian: شهردان, also Romanized as Shahrdān; also known as Shahrdūn) is a village in Jorjafak Rural District, in the Central District of Zarand County, Kerman Province, Iran. At the 2006 census, its population was 30, in 10 families.
