= Gowd-e Alangu =

Gowd-e Alangu گودالنگو
- Village
- Country: Iran
- Province: Kerman
- County: Zarand
- Bakhsh: Central
- Rural District: Hotkan

Population (2006)
  - Total: 24
- Time zone: UTC+3:30 (IRST)
  - Summer (DST): UTC+4:30 (IRDT)

Gowd-e Alangu (Persian: گودالنگو, also Romanized as Gowd-e Ālangū) is a village in Hotkan Rural District, in the Central District of Zarand County, Kerman Province, Iran. At the 2006 census, its population was 24, in 7 families.
