= Bab Hutak =

Bab Hutak باب هوتك
- Village
- Location within Iran
- Coordinates: 31°02′42″N 56°32′11″E
- Country: Iran
- Province: Kerman
- County: Zarand
- Bakhsh: Central
- Rural District: Dasht-e Khak

Population (2006)
  - Total: 142
- Time zone: UTC+3:30 (IRST)
  - Summer (DST): UTC+4:30 (IRDT)

Bab Hutak (Persian: باب هوتك, also Romanized as Bāb Hūtak) is a village in Dasht-e Khak Rural District, in the Central District of Zarand County, Kerman Province, Iran. At the 2006 census, its population was 142, in 43 families.
