= Ab Khizuiyeh =

Ab Khizuiyeh ابخيزوييه
- Village
- Location within Iran
- Coordinates: 31°02′08″N 56°33′38″E
- Country: Iran
- Province: Kerman
- County: Zarand
- Bakhsh: Central
- Rural District: Dasht-e Khak

Population (2006)
  - Total: 11
- Time zone: UTC+3:30 (IRST)
  - Summer (DST): UTC+4:30 (IRDT)

Ab Khizuiyeh (Persian: ابخيزوييه, also Romanized as Āb Khīzūīyeh and Ābkhīzūeeyeh) is a village in Dasht-e Khak Rural District, in the Central District of Zarand County, Kerman Province, Iran. At the 2006 census, its population was 11, in 4 families.
