= Hikan-e Bala =

Hikan-e Bala حيكان بالا
- Village
- Location within Iran
- Coordinates: 30°57′59″N 56°53′33″E
- Country: Iran
- Province: Kerman
- County: Zarand
- Bakhsh: Central
- Rural District: Hotkan

Population (2006)
  - Total: 60
- Time zone: UTC+3:30 (IRST)
  - Summer (DST): UTC+4:30 (IRDT)

Hikan-e Bala (Persian: حيكان بالا, also Romanized as Ḩīkān-e Bālā; also known as Ḩīkān, Hīkān-e ‘Olyā, Hikūn-e ‘Olyā, and Hīkūn ‘Olyā) is a village in Hotkan Rural District, in the Central District of Zarand County, Kerman Province, Iran. At the 2006 census, its population was 60, in 15 families.
