= Hamidiyeh, Zarand =

Village in Kerman province, Iran

Hamidiyeh Persian: حميديه
- Village
- Location within Iran
- Coordinates: 30°40′00″N 56°46′14″E
- Country: Iran
- Province: Kerman
- County: Zarand
- District: Central
- Rural District: Khanuk

Population (2016)
  - Total: 1,068
- Time zone: UTC+3:30 (IRST)

Hamidiyeh (Persian: حميديه) (Note: Also romanized as Ḩamīdīyeh; also known as Malekābād (ملك اباد) and Mīlkābād) is a village in Khanuk Rural District of the Central District of Zarand County, Kerman province, Iran.

== Demographics ==
=== Population ===
At the time of the 2006 National Census, the village's population was 883 in 207 households. The following census in 2011 counted 913 people in 244 households. The 2016 census measured the population of the village as 1,068 people in 283 households. It was the most populous village in its rural district.
