= Dasht-e Khak =

Village in Kerman province, Iran

Dasht-e Khak Persian: دشت خاك
- Village
- Location within Iran
- Coordinates: 31°04′11″N 56°33′12″E
- Country: Iran
- Province: Kerman
- County: Zarand
- District: Central
- Rural District: Dasht-e Khak

Population (2016)
  - Total: 3,404
- Time zone: UTC+3:30 (IRST)

Dasht-e Khak (Persian: دشت خاك) (Note: Also romanized as Dasht Khāk, Dasht-e Khāk, and Dasht-i-Khāk) is a village in, and the capital of, Dasht-e Khak Rural District of the Central District of Zarand County, Kerman province, Iran.

== Demographics ==
=== Population ===
At the time of the 2006 National Census, the village's population was 3,328 in 835 households. The following census in 2011 counted 3,618 people in 1,034 households. The 2016 census measured the population of the village as 3,404 people in 1,023 households. It was the most populous village in its rural district.
