= Dehnowiyeh, Zarand =

Dehnowiyeh دهنوئيه
- Village
- Location within Iran
- Coordinates: 31°00′12″N 56°38′53″E
- Country: Iran
- Province: Kerman
- County: Zarand
- Bakhsh: Central
- Rural District: Sarbanan

Population (2006)
  - Total: 84
- Time zone: UTC+3:30 (IRST)
  - Summer (DST): UTC+4:30 (IRDT)

Dehnowiyeh (Persian: دهنوئيه, also Romanized as Dehnow’īyeh; also known as Deh Now) is a village in Sarbanan Rural District, in the Central District of Zarand County, Kerman Province, Iran. At the 2006 census, its population was 84, in 21 families.
