= Sar Bagh =

Sar Bagh سرباغ
- Village
- Location within Iran
- Coordinates: 30°51′07″N 56°47′57″E
- Country: Iran
- Province: Kerman
- County: Zarand
- Bakhsh: Central
- Rural District: Hotkan

Population (2006)
  - Total: 57
- Time zone: UTC+3:30 (IRST)
  - Summer (DST): UTC+4:30 (IRDT)

Sar Bagh (Persian: سرباغ, also Romanized as Sar Bāgh, Sar-e Bāgh, and Sarabagh) is a village in Hotkan Rural District, in the Central District of Zarand County, Kerman Province, Iran. At the 2006 census, its population was 57, in 12 families.
