= Jowzuiyeh =

Jowzuiyeh or Juzuiyeh (Persian: جوزوييه or جوزوئيه) may refer to:

- Juzuiyeh, Baft, Kerman Province (جوزوييه - Jūzūīyeh)
- Jowzuiyeh, Jiroft, Kerman Province (جوزوئيه - Jowzū’īyeh)
- Jowzuiyeh, Zarand, Kerman Province (جوزوييه - Jowzūīyeh)
