= Jorjafak =

Village in Kerman province, Iran

Jorjafak Persian: جرجافك
- Village
- Location within Iran
- Coordinates: 30°38′32″N 56°19′54″E
- Country: Iran
- Province: Kerman
- County: Zarand
- District: Central
- Rural District: Jorjafak

Population (2016)
  - Total: 1,093
- Time zone: UTC+3:30 (IRST)

Jorjafak (Persian: جرجافك) (Note: Also romanized as Jorjafk and Jorjāfk; also known as Jorjānak) is a village in, and the capital of, Jorjafak Rural District of the Central District of Zarand County, Kerman province, Iran.

== Demographics ==
=== Population ===
At the time of the 2006 National Census, the village's population was 772 in 216 households. The following census in 2011 counted 1,060 people in 303 households. The 2016 census measured the population of the village as 1,093 people in 339 households. It was the most populous village in its rural district.
