= Sang, Kerman =

Village in Kerman province, Iran

Sang Persian: سنگ
- Village
- Location within Iran
- Coordinates: 30°52′24″N 56°08′04″E
- Country: Iran
- Province: Kerman
- County: Zarand
- District: Yazdanabad
- Rural District: Siriz

Population (2016)
  - Total: 483
- Time zone: UTC+3:30 (IRST)

Sang (Persian: سنگ) (Note: Also known as Sang Siriz and Sang-e Sīrīz) is a village in, and the capital of, Siriz Rural District in Yazdanabad District of Zarand County, Kerman province, Iran. The previous capital of the rural district was the village of Siriz, now a city.

== Demographics ==
=== Population ===
At the time of the 2006 National Census, the village's population was 415 in 97 households. The following census in 2011 counted 444 people in 134 households. The 2016 census measured the population of the village as 483 people in 145 households.
