= Dar-e Bid Khun =

Dar-e Bid Khun دربيدخون
- Village
- Location within Iran
- Coordinates: 30°46′13″N 56°48′50″E
- Country: Iran
- Province: Kerman
- County: Zarand
- Bakhsh: Central
- Rural District: Eslamabad

Population (2006)
  - Total: 72
- Time zone: UTC+3:30 (IRST)
  - Summer (DST): UTC+4:30 (IRDT)

Dar-e Bid Khun (Persian: دربيدخون, also Romanized as Dār-e Bīd Khūn; also known as Bab Bīdkhan, Bāb-e Bīd Khvān, Bīd-e Khūnī, Bīdkhūn, and Deh-Bīd Khūn) is a village in Eslamabad Rural District, in the Central District of Zarand County, Kerman Province, Iran. At the 2006 census, its population was 72, in 15 families.
