= Yazdanabad (disambiguation) =

Yazdanabad is an alternate name of Yazdan Shahr, a city in Kerman Province, Iran.

Yazdanabad (Persian: يزدان اباد) may refer to various places in Iran:

- Yazdanabad, Mazandaran
- Yazdanabad, North Khorasan
- Yazdanabad-e Olya, Razavi Khorasan Province
- Yazdanabad-e Sharqi, Razavi Khorasan Province
- Yazdanabad-e Sofla, Razavi Khorasan Province
- Yazdanabad, Semnan
- Yazdanabad District, in Kerman Province
- Yazdanabad Rural District, in Kerman Province
