= Ahmadi, Zarand =

Village in Kerman province, Iran

Ahmadi Persian: احمدي
- Village
- Location within Iran
- Coordinates: 31°00′50″N 56°37′53″E
- Country: Iran
- Province: Kerman
- County: Zarand
- District: Central
- Rural District: Sarbanan

Population (2016)
  - Total: 378
- Time zone: UTC+3:30 (IRST)

Ahmadi (Persian: احمدي) (Note: Also romanized as Aḩmadī; also known as Ahmad, Aḩmadī-ye Sar Boneh, Aḩmadī-ye Sarneh, and Aḩmadī-ye Saroneh) is a village in, and the capital of, Sarbanan Rural District of the Central District of Zarand County, Kerman province, Iran.

== Demographics ==
=== Population ===
At the time of the 2006 National Census, the village's population was 395 in 101 households. The following census in 2011 counted 271 people in 85 households. The 2016 census measured the population of the village as 378 people in 124 households.
