= Deh-e Banan-e Bala =

Village in Kerman, Iran

Deh-e Banan-e Bala ده بنان بالا
- Village
- Location within Iran
- Coordinates: 31°08′57″N 56°33′11″E
- Country: Iran
- Province: Kerman
- County: Zarand
- Bakhsh: Central
- Rural District: Dasht-e Khak

Population (2006)
  - Total: 107
- Time zone: UTC+3:30 (IRST)
  - Summer (DST): UTC+4:30 (IRDT)

Deh-e Banan-e Bala (Persian: ده بنان بالا, also Romanized as Deh-e Banān-e Bālā; also known as Bonān, Deh Banān, and Deh-e Banān) is a village in Dasht-e Khak Rural District, in the Central District of Zarand County, Kerman Province, Iran. At the 2006 census, its population was 107, in 30 families.
