= Jalalabad, Zarand =

Village in Kerman province, Iran

Jalalabad Persian: جلال اباد
- Village
- Location within Iran
- Coordinates: 30°51′59″N 56°27′46″E
- Country: Iran
- Province: Kerman
- County: Zarand
- District: Yazdanabad
- Rural District: Yazdanabad

Population (2016)
  - Total: 2,177
- Time zone: UTC+3:30 (IRST)

Jalalabad (Persian: جلال اباد) (Note: Also romanized as Jalālābād) is a village in Yazdanabad Rural District of Yazdanabad District, Zarand County, Kerman province, Iran.

== Demographics ==
=== Population ===
At the time of the 2006 National Census, the village's population was 1,902 in 443 households. The following census in 2011 counted 1,976 people in 557 households. The 2016 census measured the population of the village as 2,177 people in 636 households. It was the most populous village in its rural district.
