= Khomruduiyeh =

Khomruduiyeh or Khamruduiyeh or Khamardooeyeh (Persian: خمرودوئيه) may refer to:

- Khomruduiyeh, Rafsanjan
- Khomruduiyeh, Zarand

== See also ==
- Khomrutuiyeh
