= Deh-e Shoeyb-e Do =

Deh-e Shoeyb-e Do ده شعيب2
- Village
- Location within Iran
- Coordinates: 30°34′20″N 56°25′15″E
- Country: Iran
- Province: Kerman
- County: Zarand
- Bakhsh: Central
- Rural District: Jorjafak

Population (2006)
  - Total: 34
- Time zone: UTC+3:30 (IRST)
  - Summer (DST): UTC+4:30 (IRDT)

Deh-e Shoeyb-e Do (Persian: ده شعيب2, also Romanized as Deh-e Sho‘eyb-e Do; also known as Deh-e Sho‘eyb and Deh Sho‘eyb) is a village in Jorjafak Rural District, in the Central District of Zarand County, Kerman Province, Iran. At the 2006 census, its population was 34, in 12 families.
