= Deh-e Now, Zarand =

Neighborhood in Kerman province, Iran

Deh-e Now Persian: ,دهنو
- Neighborhood
- Location within Iran
- Coordinates: 31°01′18″N 55°57′55″E
- Country: Iran
- Province: Kerman
- County: Zarand
- District: Yazdanabad
- City: Siriz

Population (2016)
  - Total: 962
- Time zone: UTC+3:30 (IRST)

Deh-e Now (Persian: دهنو) (Note: Also romanized as Dehnow; also known as Khodāābād, Khodadad, and Khudāābād) is a neighborhood in the city of Siriz in Yazdanabad District of Zarand County, Kerman province, Iran.

== Demographics ==
=== Population ===
At the time of the 2006 National Census, Deh-e Now's population was 809 in 189 households, when it was a village in Siriz Rural District. The following census in 2011 counted 992 people in 283 households. The 2016 census measured the population of the village as 962 people in 283 households. It was the most populous village in its rural district.

In 2019, the village of Siriz merged with the villages of Deh-e Bala, Deh-e Khvajeh, Deh-e Now, Fathabad, and Muruiyeh to become a city.
