= Jowzuiyeh, Zarand =

Jowzuiyeh جوزوييه
- Village
- Location within Iran
- Coordinates: 30°55′48″N 56°38′39″E
- Country: Iran
- Province: Kerman
- County: Zarand
- Bakhsh: Central
- Rural District: Sarbanan

Population (2006)
  - Total: 25
- Time zone: UTC+3:30 (IRST)
  - Summer (DST): UTC+4:30 (IRDT)

Jowzuiyeh (Persian: جوزوييه, also Romanized as Jowzūīyeh and Jozūeeyeh) is a village in Sarbanan Rural District, in the Central District of Zarand County, Kerman Province, Iran. At the 2006 census, its population was 25, in 6 families.
