= Dehnow-e Sang =

Dehnow-e Sang دهنوسنگ
- Village
- Location within Iran
- Coordinates: 30°52′27″N 56°08′00″E
- Country: Iran
- Province: Kerman
- County: Zarand
- Bakhsh: Yazdanabad
- Rural District: Siriz

Population (2006)
  - Total: 489
- Time zone: UTC+3:30 (IRST)
  - Summer (DST): UTC+4:30 (IRDT)

Dehnow-e Sang (Persian: دهنوسنگ, also Romanized as Dehnow Sang; also known as Deh-i-Nau, Deh Nan, Deh Now, Dehnow, and Dehnow’īyeh) is a village in Siriz Rural District, Yazdanabad District, Zarand County, Kerman Province, Iran. At the 2006 census, its population was 489, in 119 families.
