= Tajarak =

Tajarak or Tejerk (Persian: تجرك) may refer to:

- Tajarak, Hamadan, Hamadan Province, Iran
- Tajarak, Kerman, Kerman Province, Iran
- Tejerk, alternate name of Tezerj, Jorjafak, Kerman Province, Iran
- Tajarak, Qazvin, Qazvin Province, Iran
