= Khomruduiyeh, Zarand =

Khomruduiyeh خمرودوئيه
- Village
- Location within Iran
- Coordinates: 30°50′33″N 56°50′11″E
- Country: Iran
- Province: Kerman
- County: Zarand
- Bakhsh: Central
- Rural District: Hotkan

Population (2006)
  - Total: 16
- Time zone: UTC+3:30 (IRST)
  - Summer (DST): UTC+4:30 (IRDT)

Khomruduiyeh (Persian: خمرودوئيه, also Romanized as Khomrūdū’īyeh and Khamardoo’eyeh; also known as Amrū’īyeh (Persian: امروئيه), Amredū’īyeh, Amroodiyeh Soosafid, Amrūdīyeh, Amrūdīyeh-ye Sū Sefīd, and Khomrūt) is a village in Hotkan Rural District, in the Central District of Zarand County, Kerman Province, Iran. At the 2006 census, its population was 16, in 7 families.
