= Gowrun, Kerman =

Gowrun گوران
- Village
- Location within Iran
- Coordinates: 30°57′30″N 56°44′29″E
- Country: Iran
- Province: Kerman
- County: Zarand
- Bakhsh: Central
- Rural District: Sarbanan

Population (2006)
  - Total: 18
- Time zone: UTC+3:30 (IRST)
  - Summer (DST): UTC+4:30 (IRDT)

Gowrun (Persian: گوران, also Romanized as Gowrūn; also known as Gabrān, Gebrān, and Jowrān) is a village in Sarbanan Rural District, in the Central District of Zarand County, Kerman Province, Iran. At the 2006 census, its population was 18, in 5 families.
