= Henguiyeh, Zarand =

Henguiyeh هنگوئيه
- Village
- Location within Iran
- Coordinates: 30°42′16″N 56°14′59″E
- Country: Iran
- Province: Kerman
- County: Zarand
- Bakhsh: Central
- Rural District: Jorjafak

Population (2006)
  - Total: 22
- Time zone: UTC+3:30 (IRST)
  - Summer (DST): UTC+4:30 (IRDT)

Henguiyeh (Persian: هنگوئيه, also Romanized as Hengū’īyeh; also known as Hankū’īyeh, Honkū’īyeh, Hamgū’īyeh, Hamkoo’eyeh, Hamkū’īyeh, and Hatgū’īyeh) is a village in Jorjafak Rural District, in the Central District of Zarand County, Kerman Province, Iran. At the 2006 census, its population was 22, in 8 families.
