= Hosen, Iran =

Hosen حصين
- Village
- Location within Iran
- Coordinates: 30°46′08″N 56°07′09″E
- Country: Iran
- Province: Kerman
- County: Zarand
- Bakhsh: Central
- Rural District: Jorjafak

Population (2006)
  - Total: 103
- Time zone: UTC+3:30 (IRST)
  - Summer (DST): UTC+4:30 (IRDT)

Hosen (Persian: حصين, also Romanized as Ḩoşen, Ḩoşn, and Ḩeşn; also known as Hesan and Qaryeh-ye Ḩeşn) is a village in Jorjafak Rural District, in the Central District of Zarand County, Kerman Province, Iran. At the 2006 census, its population was 103, in 38 families.
