= Bahaabad, Kerman =

Village in Kerman province, Iran

Bahaabad Persian: بهااباد
- Village
- Location within Iran
- Coordinates: 30°44′21″N 56°37′41″E
- Country: Iran
- Province: Kerman
- County: Zarand
- District: Central
- Rural District: Vahdat

Population (2016)
  - Total: 2,965
- Time zone: UTC+3:30 (IRST)

Bahaabad (Persian: بهااباد) (Note: Also romanized as Bahā’ābād; also known as Bābād and Bahābād) is a village in, and the capital of, Vahdat Rural District of the Central District of Zarand County, Kerman province, Iran.

== Demographics ==
=== Population ===
At the time of the 2006 National Census, the village's population was 2,494 in 609 households. The following census in 2011 counted 2,794 people in 768 households. The 2016 census measured the population of the village as 2,965 people in 853 households. It was the most populous village in its rural district.
