= Lut Desert =

Desert in Iran, UNESCO Site

- Dasht-e Lut
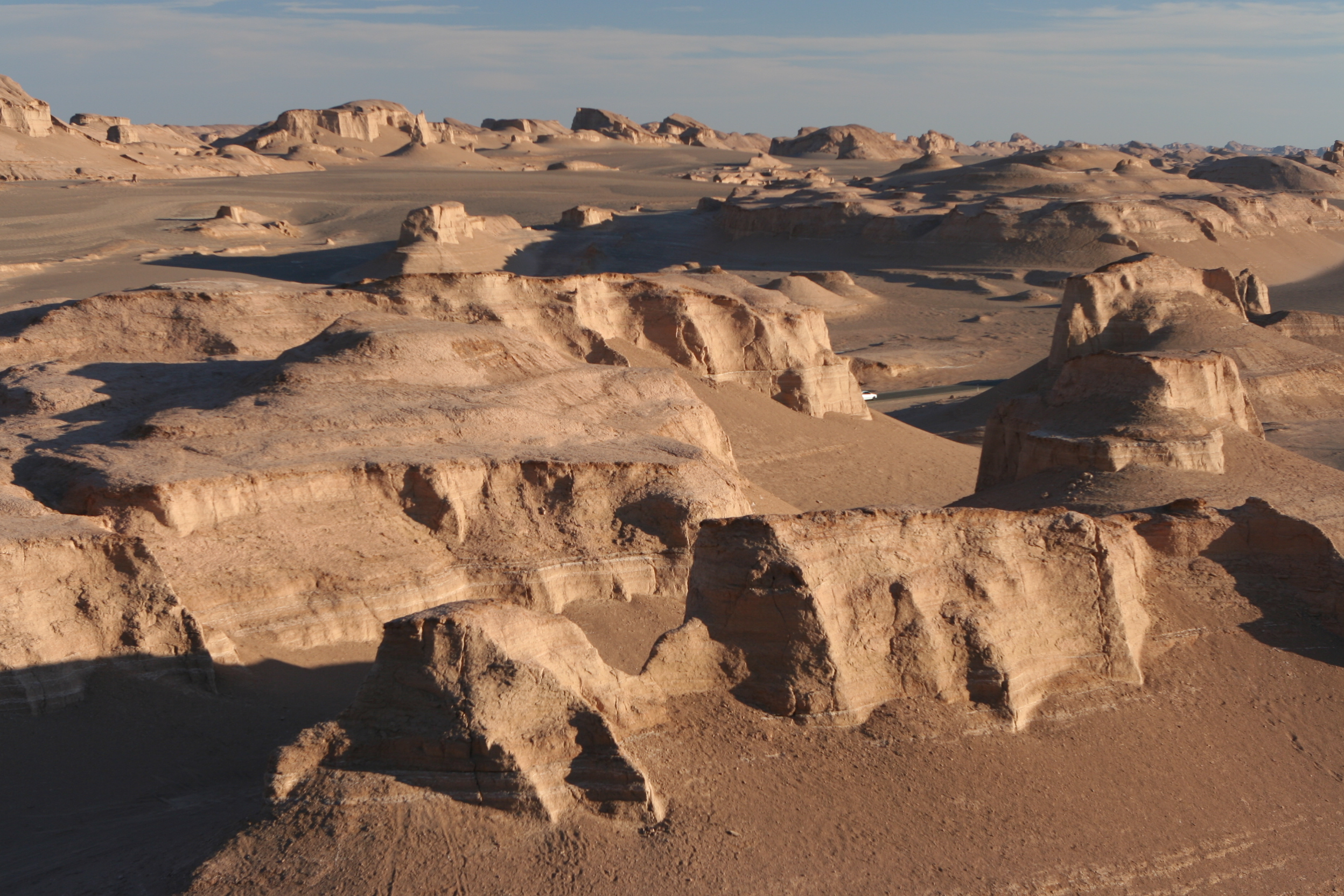

- Location within Iran
- Floor elevation: 108 m (354 ft)
- Length: 480 km (300 mi)
- Width: 320 km (200 mi)
- Area: 51,800 km^{2} (20,000 mi^{2})

Geography
- Country: Iran
- Coordinates: 30°36′18″N 59°04′04″E
- Interactive map of Lut Desert

UNESCO World Heritage Site
- Official name: Lut Desert
- Criteria: vii, viii
- Reference: 1505
- Inscription: 2016 (40th Session)
- Website: www.lutdesert.ir

Lut Desert (Persian: دشت لوت, romanized: Dasht-e Lut, lit. 'Plain of Emptiness') is a desert with both extensive salt flats and dunes located in the provinces of Kerman and Sistan-Baluchestan, Iran. It is the world's 33rd-largest desert, and was included in UNESCO's World Heritage List on 17 July 2016.

The name is derived from Lut which means 'bare, empty' in Persian and dasht which means 'plain, flatland' in Persian.

The surface of its sand has been measured at temperatures as high as 70.7 °C (159.3 °F), which is the highest-known land surface temperature on Earth.

== Description ==
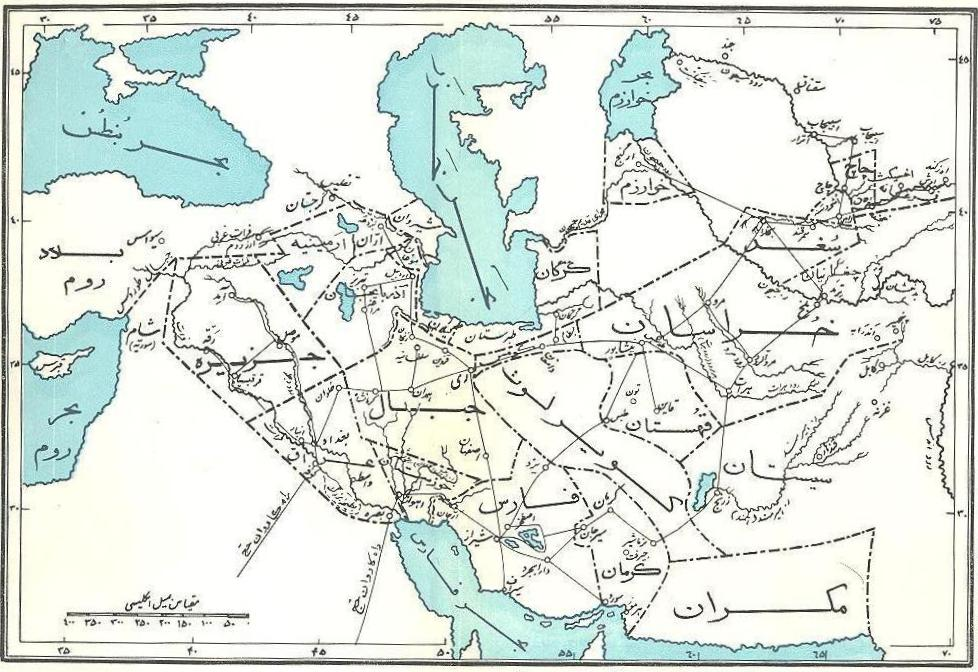
Map showing the Lut Desert during the time of the Abbasid Caliphate as part of a continuum with the Kavir Desert.

Iran is climatically part of the Afro-Asian belt of deserts, which stretches from Mauritania all the way to Mongolia.

Iran's geography consists of a plateau surrounded by mountains and divided into drainage basins. Dasht-e Lut is one of the largest of these drainage basins, 480 kilometers (300 mi) long and 320 kilometers (200 mi) wide.

The area of the desert is about 51,800 square kilometres (20,000 sq mi), the largest in Iran after Dasht-e Kavir. During the spring wet season, water briefly flows down from the Kerman mountains, but it soon dries up, leaving behind only rocks, sand, and salt.

The eastern part of Dasht-e Lut is a low plateau covered with salt flats with lowest elevations around 110 m above sea level (30.398609 N, 58.493041 E). In contrast, the center has been sculpted by the wind into a series of parallel ridges and furrows, extending over 150 km (93 mi) and reaching 75 metres (246 ft) in height. This area is also riddled with ravines and sinkholes. The southeast is a vast expanse of sand, like a Saharan erg, with dunes 300 metres (980 ft) high, among the tallest in the world.

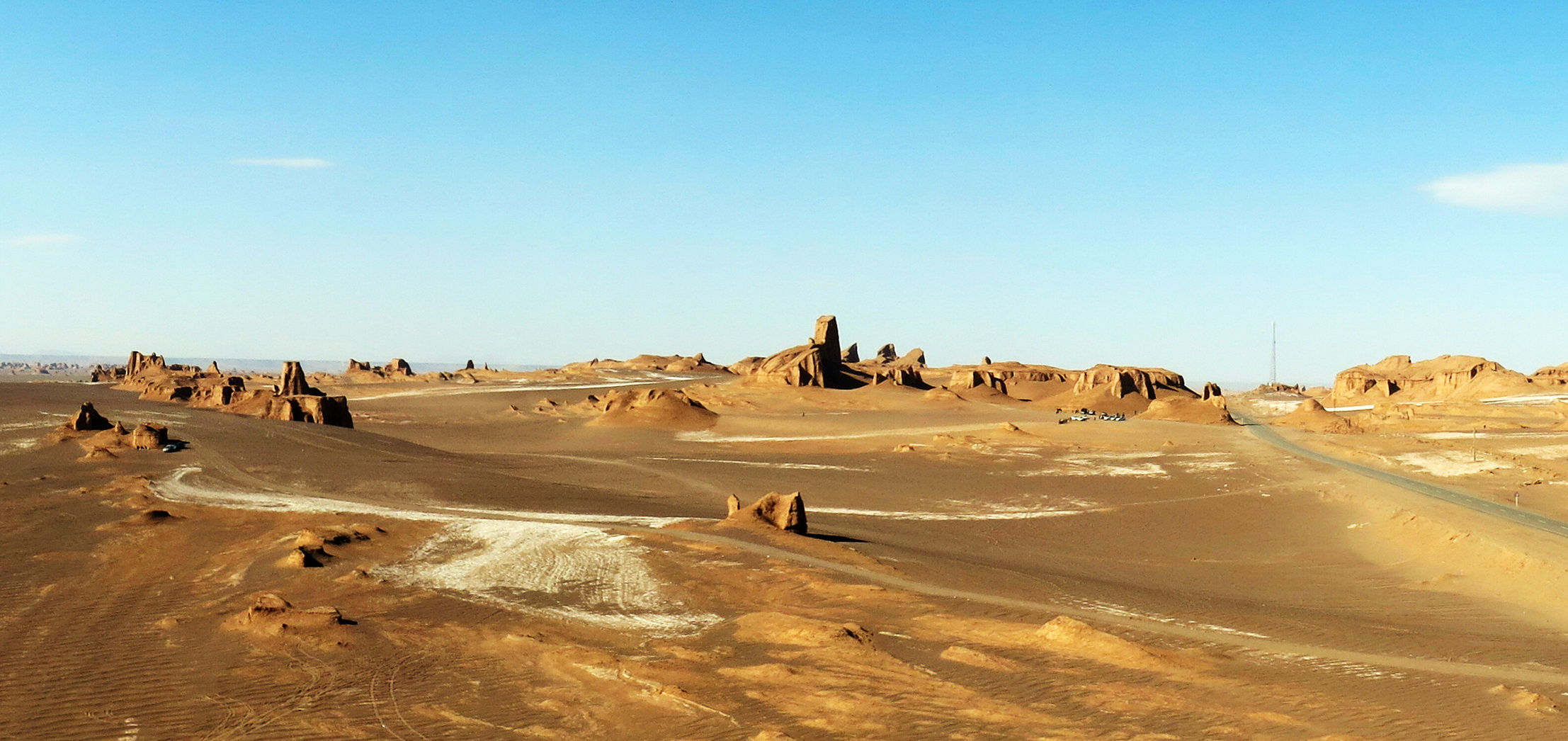
Yardangs in Lut Desert, Kerman Province, Iran

== Geology ==
According to one study, more than half of the desert's surface is covered by volcanic rocks. Evaporites can be observed during hot periods.

== Archaeology ==
Around 2500 BC, a flourishing civilization, the Jiroft culture, existed in this area. The ancient city of Shahdad was located on the western edge of the Lut desert. And on the eastern side, there was a large, 200 ha (490 acres), ancient city today called Shahr-e Sukhteh or Burnt City, on the former, now dry, Helmand River.

The Lut area is an important region for Iranian archaeology. Recently, an extensive archaeological survey was conducted on the eastern flank of Kerman range and close to the western fringes of Lut Desert. As a result, eighty-seven ancient sites dating from the fifth millennium BC to the late Islamic era were identified. Twenty-three of these sites are assigned to the Chalcolithic period and Bronze Age.

== Climate ==
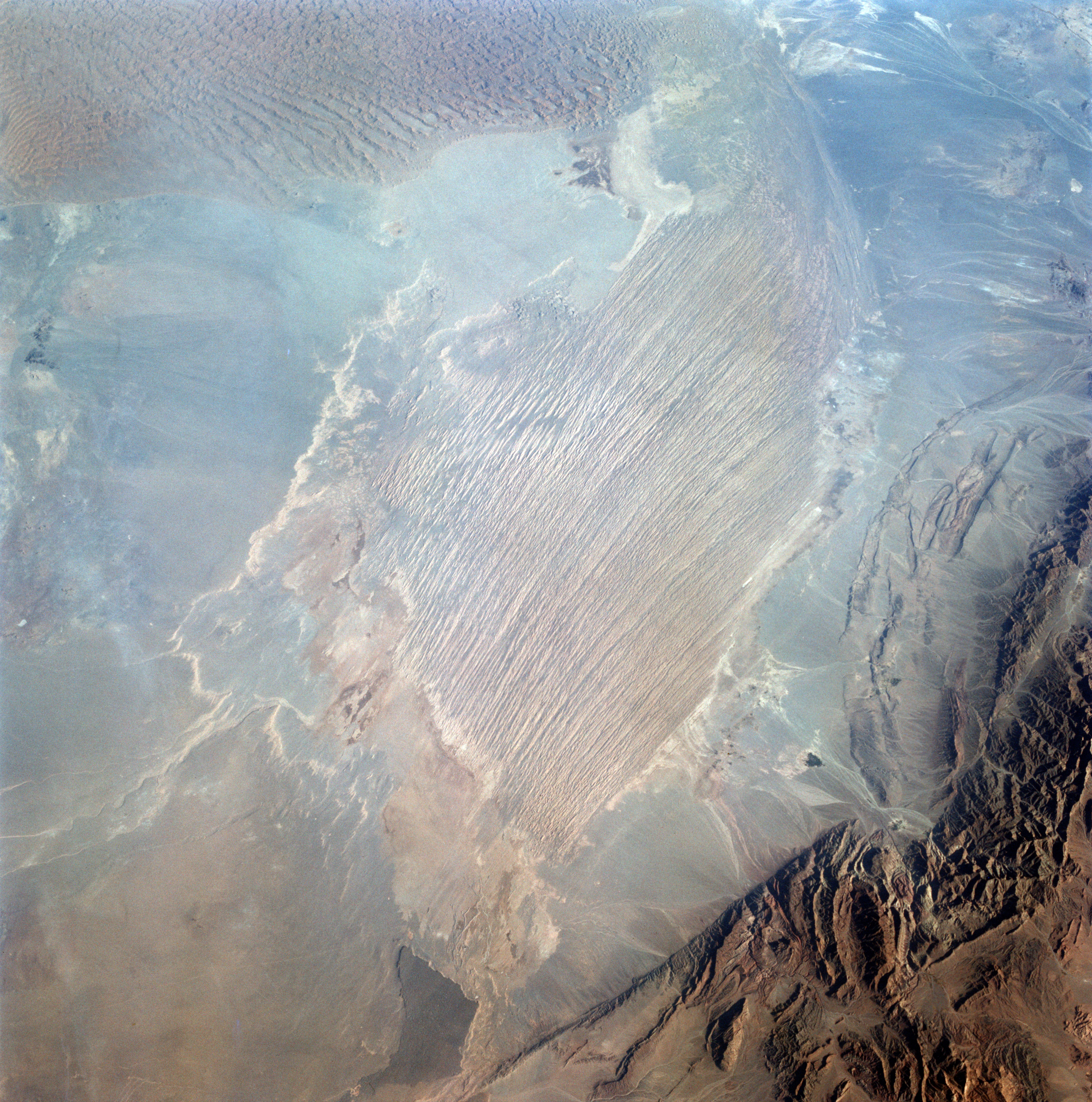
Namak-Zar region of Dasht-e-Lut, from space

The hottest land surface on Earth recorded by the Moderate-Resolution Imaging Spectroradiometer installed on NASA's Aqua satellite from 2003 to 2010 was in Dasht-e Lut, with land surface temperatures reaching 70.7 °C (159.3 °F) in 2005, although the air temperature at that time could have been anywhere from 30 to 54 °C (86 to 129 °F). The precision of these measurements was between 0.5 K and 1 K. In 2019, authors reported a land surface temperature of 80.83 °C (177.49 °F), based on newer MODIS data.

As of 2020, there are no permanent weather stations in Dasht-e Lut, which makes the exact climate uncertain. Based on neighboring stations, Dasht-e Lut likely receives less than 30 millimetres (1.2 in) of precipitation a year. In comparison, the Atacama Desert receives an average of 15 mm (0.59 in) of precipitation per year, with some areas receiving as little as 1 to 3 mm (0.04 to 0.12 in) a year.

== See also ==
- Dasht-e Kavir
- Geography of Iran
- International rankings of Iran
