= Hotkan =

Village in Kerman province, Iran

Hotkan Persian: حتكن
- Village
- Location within Iran
- Coordinates: 30°51′07″N 56°47′54″E
- Country: Iran
- Province: Kerman
- County: Zarand
- District: Central
- Rural District: Hotkan

Population (2016)
  - Total: 253
- Time zone: UTC+3:30 (IRST)

Hotkan (Persian: حتكن) (Note: Also romanized as Ḩotkan) is a village in, and the capital of, Hotkan Rural District of the Central District of Zarand County, Kerman province, Iran.

== Demographics ==
=== Population ===
At the time of the 2006 National Census, the village's population was 281 in 93 households. The following census in 2011 counted 238 people in 74 households. The 2016 census measured the population of the village as 253 people in 87 households. It was the most populous village in its rural district.
