= Bidkhun =

Bidkhun (Persian: بيدخون) may refer to:

- Bidkhun-e Morghak
- Bidkhun, Kerman
