= Gurun =

Gurun or Gowrun may refer to:

- Gurun, Iran, a village in Chaharmahal and Bakhtiari Province, Iran
- Gowrun, Kerman, a village in Kerman Province, Iran
- Gurun, Kedah, a town in Malaysia
- Gurun, a fictional planet from the Slovak TV series Spadla z oblakov
- Gurun, a character in the lay "Le Fresne", by Marie de France
- Gurun (state constituency)

== See also ==
- Gürün
