= Henguiyeh =

Hongouyeh or Hngouyeh or Hongouyeh or Hangooyeh (Persian: هنگویه) may refer to:

- Henguiyeh, Hormozgan
- Henguiyeh, Baft, Kerman Province
- Henguiyeh, Sirjan, Kerman Province
- Henguiyeh, Zarand, Kerman Province
