= Tezerj, Sarbanan =

Tezerj تزرج
- Village
- Location within Iran
- Coordinates: 30°56′21″N 56°46′50″E
- Country: Iran
- Province: Kerman
- County: Zarand
- Bakhsh: Central
- Rural District: Sarbanan

Population (2006)
  - Total: 41
- Time zone: UTC+3:30 (IRST)
  - Summer (DST): UTC+4:30 (IRDT)

Tezerj (Persian: تزرج, also Romanized as Tezarj and Taz̄arj; also known as Tajarak, Tedjerek, and Tejerk) is a village in Sarbanan Rural District, in the Central District of Zarand County, Kerman Province, Iran. As of the 2006 census, its population was 41, in 16 families.
