= Tezerj, Jorjafak =

Tezerj تزرج
- Village
- Location within Iran
- Coordinates: 30°41′45″N 56°15′42″E
- Country: Iran
- Province: Kerman
- County: Zarand
- Bakhsh: Central
- Rural District: Jorjafak

Population (2006)
  - Total: 69
- Time zone: UTC+3:30 (IRST)
  - Summer (DST): UTC+4:30 (IRDT)

Tezerj (Persian: تزرج, also Romanized as Tez̄erj; also known as Tejerk) is a village in Jorjafak Rural District, in the Central District of Zarand County, Kerman Province, Iran. At the 2006 census, its population was 69, in 16 families.
