= Dahuiyeh, Zarand =

Village in Kerman province, Iran

Dahuiyeh Persian: داهوييه
- Village
- Location within Iran
- Coordinates: 30°46′11″N 56°42′38″E
- Country: Iran
- Province: Kerman
- County: Zarand
- District: Central
- Rural District: Eslamabad

Population (2016)
  - Total: 1,060
- Time zone: UTC+3:30 (IRST)

Dahuiyeh (Persian: داهوييه) (Note: Also romanized as Dahoo’eyeh and Dāhū’īyeh; also known as Dahu and Rāhū’īyeh) is a village in Eslamabad Rural District of the Central District of Zarand County, Kerman province, Iran.

== Demographics ==
=== Population ===
At the time of the 2006 National Census, the village's population was 738 in 189 households. The following census in 2011 counted 824 people in 260 households. The 2016 census measured the population of the village as 1,060 people in 332 households. It was the most populous village in its rural district.
