= Qatruiyeh, Kerman =

Qatruiyeh قطروييه
- Village
- Location within Iran
- Coordinates: 30°57′59″N 56°49′00″E
- Country: Iran
- Province: Kerman
- County: Ravar
- Bakhsh: Central
- Rural District: Hotkan

Population (2006)
  - Total: 137
- Time zone: UTC+3:30 (IRST)
  - Summer (DST): UTC+4:30 (IRDT)

Qatruiyeh (Persian: قطروييه, also Romanized as Qaţrū’īyeh; also known as Ghatroo’eyeh, Kadrū, Kadrūd, and Qadrūn) is a village in Hotkan Rural District, in the Central District of Ravar County, Kerman Province, Iran. At the 2006 census, its population was 137, in 41 families.
