= Dehnowiyeh =

Dehnowiyeh (Persian: دهنوئيه) may refer to:

- Dehnowiyeh, Zarand
- Dehnowiyeh, Yazdanabad, Zarand County
