= Isaabad, Kerman =

Village in Kerman province, Iran

Isaabad Persian: عيسي اباد
- Village
- Location within Iran
- Coordinates: 30°59′28″N 56°41′53″E
- Country: Iran
- Province: Kerman
- County: Zarand
- District: Central
- Rural District: Sarbanan

Population (2016)
  - Total: 665
- Time zone: UTC+3:30 (IRST)

Isaabad (Persian: عيسي اباد) (Note: Also romanized as ‘Īsáābād; also known as ‘Īsāābād-e Sar Bonān and Īsīābād) is a village in Sarbanan Rural District of the Central District of Zarand County, Kerman province, Iran.

At the 2006 National Census, its population was 609 in 145 households. The following census in 2011 counted 610 people in 162 households. The 2016 census measured the population of the village as 665 people in 196 households. It was the most populous village in its rural district.
