= Hesan =

Hesan may refer to:

- Heşan, Azerbaijan
- Hesan, Iran
