= 2005 Iran earthquake =

The 2005 Iran earthquake may refer to:

- 2005 Zarand earthquake, February 22
- 2005 Qeshm earthquake, November 27

== See also ==
- List of earthquakes in Iran
