= Zarkuiyeh =

Zarkuiyeh or Zarkooeyeh (Persian: زاركوييه) may refer to:

- Zarkuiyeh, Kerman
- Zarkuiyeh, Yazd
