= Siriz =

City in Kerman province, Iran

Siriz Persian: سيريز
- City
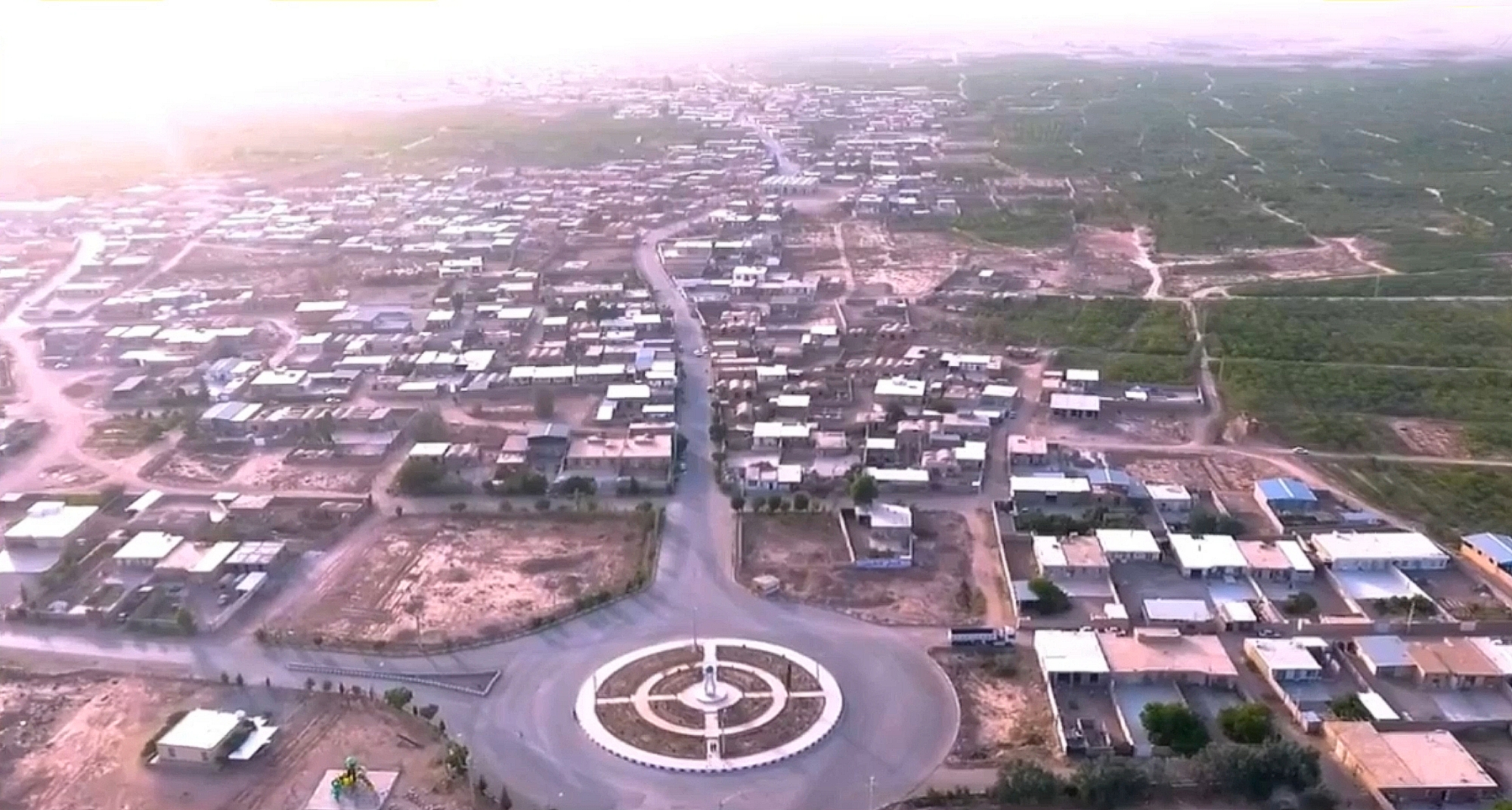

- Location within Iran
- Coordinates: 31°01′02″N 55°58′12″E
- Country: Iran
- Province: Kerman
- County: Zarand
- District: Yazdanabad

Population (2016)
  - Total: 401
- Time zone: UTC+3:30 (IRST)

Siriz (Persian: سيريز) (Note: Also romanized as Sīrīz; also known as Sārīz) is a city in Yazdanabad District of Zarand County, Kerman province, Iran. As a village, it was the capital of Siriz Rural District until its capital was transferred to the village of Sang.

== Demographics ==
=== Population ===
At the time of the 2006 National Census, Siriz's population was 655 in 173 households, when it was a village in Siriz Rural District. The following census in 2011 counted 483 people in 152 households. The 2016 census measured the population of the village as 401 people in 130 households.

Siriz merged with the villages of Deh-e Bala, Deh-e Khvajeh, Deh-e Now, Fathabad, and Muruiyeh to become a city in 2019.
