= Deh Shoeyb =

Deh Shoeyb or Deh-e Shoeyb (Persian: ده شعيب) may refer to:

- Deh Shoeyb, Ravar
- Deh Shoeyb, Zarand
