= Bichaghchi =

Sub-ethnic group of Turks in Iran

Total population
- Unknown

Regions with significant populations
- Kerman Province, Iran

Languages
- Azerbaijani and Persian

Religion
- Shia Islam

Related ethnic groups
- Azerbaijanis and other Turkic peoples

Bichaghchis or Bichaghchi people, (Persian: مردم بچاقچی) are a Turkic sub-ethnic group of Turks in Iran, mainly living in Kerman Province. The Bichaghchis are predominantly Shi'a Muslim and speak Azerbaijani language and Persian language.
