= Tezerj, Sirjan =

Tezerj تذرج
- Village
- Location within Iran
- Coordinates: 29°13′39″N 56°06′42″E
- Country: Iran
- Province: Kerman
- County: Sirjan
- Bakhsh: Central
- Rural District: Balvard

Population (2006)
  - Total: 48
- Time zone: UTC+3:30 (IRST)
  - Summer (DST): UTC+4:30 (IRDT)

Tezerj (Persian: تذرج; also known as Tadarj, Tadraj, Tazarch, Tazerch Deh-e Now, and Tazerch Deh Now) is a village in Balvard Rural District, in the Central District of Sirjan County, Kerman Province, Iran. At the 2006 census, its population was 48, in 11 families.
