= Tezerj, Rabor =

Tezerj تذرج
- Village
- Location within Iran
- Coordinates: 29°19′23″N 56°51′52″E
- Country: Iran
- Province: Kerman
- County: Rabor
- Bakhsh: Central
- Rural District: Rabor

Population (2006)
  - Total: 553
- Time zone: UTC+3:30 (IRST)
  - Summer (DST): UTC+4:30 (IRDT)

Tezerj (Persian: تذرج, also Romanized as Tez̄erj; also known as Tezerch) is a village in Rabor Rural District, in the Central District of Rabor County, Kerman Province, Iran. At the 2006 census, its population was 553, in 122 families.
