= Henguiyeh, Baft =

Henguiyeh هنگوييه
- Village
- Location within Iran
- Coordinates: 29°14′29″N 56°33′39″E
- Country: Iran
- Province: Kerman
- County: Baft
- Bakhsh: Central
- Rural District: Bezenjan

Population (2006)
  - Total: 45
- Time zone: UTC+3:30 (IRST)
  - Summer (DST): UTC+4:30 (IRDT)

Henguiyeh (Persian: هنگوييه, also Romanized as Hengū’īyeh) is a village in Bezenjan Rural District, in the Central District of Baft County, Kerman Province, Iran. At the 2006 census, its population was 45, in 9 families.
