= Khanuk =

City in Kerman province, Iran

Khanuk Persian: خانوك
- City
- Location within Iran
- Coordinates: 30°43′03″N 56°46′35″E
- Country: Iran
- Province: Kerman
- County: Zarand
- District: Central

Population (2016)
  - Total: 2,628
- Time zone: UTC+3:30 (IRST)

Khanuk (Persian: خانوك) (Note: Also romanized as Khānūk; also known as Khānūq) is a city in the Central District of Zarand County, Kerman province, Iran, serving as the administrative center for Khanuk Rural District. Iranian Cleric Majid Ansari is from here.

== Demographics ==
=== Population ===
At the time of the 2006 National Census, the city's population was 3,582 in 854 households. The following census in 2011 counted 2,153 people in 605 households. The 2016 census measured the population of the city as 2,628 people in 789 households.
