= Sirjan University of Technology =

- دانشگاه صنعتی سیرجان
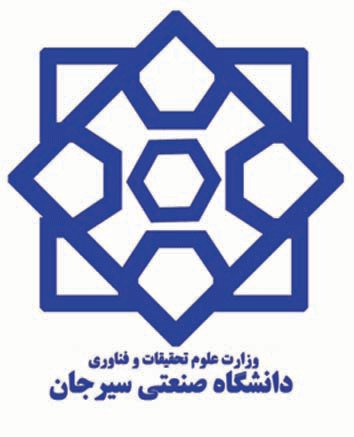
- Sirjan University of Technology
- Type: Public
- Established: 1992
- President: M.J. Mahmoodabadi
- Undergraduates: ~2500
- Location: Sirjan, Kerman province, Iran
- Website: www.sirjantech.ac.ir

Sirjan University of Technology (Persian: دانشگاه صنعتی سیرجان), is a public, coeducational research university located in Sirjan, Iran. First building of this university founded in 1992. There are currently around 4,500 students enrolled in undergraduate and graduate programs. Electrical engineering and Robotic engineering departments have been established in winter of 2012.

== Faculties ==
- Engineering
  - Department of Mechanical Engineering
  - Department of Civil Engineering
  - Department of Software Engineering
  - Department of Electrical Engineering
  - Department of Chemical Engineering
  - Department of Robotic Engineering
- Science
  - Department of Mathematics
  - Department of Physics
  - Department of Computer Sciences
  - Department of Engineering sciences

== Endowment ==
Sirjan University of technology is a public university.
