= Bidkhun-e Morghak =

Bidkhun-e Morghak بيدخون مرغك
- Village
- Location within Iran
- Coordinates: 29°07′01″N 57°53′16″E
- Country: Iran
- Province: Kerman
- County: Bam
- Bakhsh: Central
- Rural District: Deh Bakri

Population (2006)
  - Total: 34
- Time zone: UTC+3:30 (IRST)
  - Summer (DST): UTC+4:30 (IRDT)

Bidkhun-e Morghak (Persian: بيدخون مرغك, also romanized as Bīdkhūn-e Morghak; also known as Bīd Khān and Bīd Khūn) is a village in Deh Bakri Rural District, in the Central District of Bam County, Kerman Province, Iran. At the 2006 census, its population was 34, in 12 families.
