= Jowzuiyeh, Jiroft =

Jowzuiyeh جوزوئيه
- Village
- Location within Iran
- Coordinates: 29°19′14″N 57°23′42″E
- Country: Iran
- Province: Kerman
- County: Jiroft
- Bakhsh: Sarduiyeh
- Rural District: Sarduiyeh

Population (2006)
  - Total: 188
- Time zone: UTC+3:30 (IRST)
  - Summer (DST): UTC+4:30 (IRDT)

Jowzuiyeh (Persian: جوزوئيه, also Romanized as Jowzū’īyeh; also known as Jowzū) is a village in Sarduiyeh Rural District, Sarduiyeh District, Jiroft County, Kerman Province, Iran. At the 2006 census, its population was 188, in 30 families.
