= Shahrak-e Modarres =

Village in Qazvin province, Iran

Shahrak-e Modarres Persian: شهرك مدرس
- Village
- Location within Iran
- Coordinates: 35°52′16″N 49°45′18″E
- Country: Iran
- Province: Qazvin
- County: Buin Zahra
- District: Shal
- Rural District: Qaleh Hashem

Population (2016)
  - Total: 2,267
- Time zone: UTC+3:30 (IRST)

Shahrak-e Modarres (Persian: شهرك مدرس) (Note: Formerly known as Qaleh Hashem (قلعه هاشم)) is a village in, and the capital of, Qaleh Hashem Rural District in Shal District (Note: Formerly known as Dashtabi District) of Buin Zahra County, Qazvin province, Iran.

== Demographics ==
=== Population ===
At the time of the 2006 National Census, the village's population was 2,560 in 689 households. The following census in 2011 counted 2,160 people in 623 households. The 2016 census measured the population of the village as 2,267 people in 737 households. It was the most populous village in its rural district.
