= Khanuk Rural District =

Rural district in Kerman province, Iran

Khanuk Rural District Persian: دهستان خانوك
- Rural District
- Location within Iran
- Coordinates: 30°42′14″N 56°47′30″E
- Country: Iran
- Province: Kerman
- County: Zarand
- District: Central
- Capital: Khanuk

Population (2016)
  - Total: 1,136
- Time zone: UTC+3:30 (IRST)

Khanuk Rural District (Persian: دهستان خانوك) is in the Central District of Zarand County, Kerman province, Iran. It is administered from the city of Khanuk.

== Demographics ==
=== Population ===
At the time of the 2006 National Census, the rural district's population was 900 in 212 households. There were 944 inhabitants in 253 households at the following census of 2011. The 2016 census measured the population of the rural district as 1,136 in 302 households. The most populous of its seven villages was Hamidiyeh, with 1,068 people.
