= Tezerj, Shahr-e Babak =

Tezerj طزرج
- Village
- Location within Iran
- Coordinates: 30°34′50″N 55°07′42″E
- Country: Iran
- Province: Kerman
- County: Shahr-e Babak
- Bakhsh: Dehaj
- Rural District: Jowzam

Population (2006)
  - Total: 59
- Time zone: UTC+3:30 (IRST)
  - Summer (DST): UTC+4:30 (IRDT)

Tezerj (Persian: طزرج, also Romanized as Ţezerj; also known as Tīzrak) is a village in Jowzam Rural District, Dehaj District, Shahr-e Babak County, Kerman Province, Iran. At the 2006 census, its population was 59, in 20 families.
