= Kuhbonan Mountains =

Mountain range in Iran

Coordinates: 30°14′47.53″N 57°26′21.37″E

Kuhbonan Mountains or Kuhbonan Highlands, (Kuhbonan also pronounced as Kuhbanan), are a group of mountains that are located in the northern part of Kerman province in Iran. Stretching in a northwest–southeast direction, the mountain range is situated in the northwestern, eastern, and southeastern part of the city of Kerman, northeast of the town of Zarand, and southwest of the town of Ravar. With an elevation of 4233 metres, the highest point of the range is Mount Pelvar (Kuh-e Pelvar) or Mount Palvar (Kuh-e Palvar) which is located southeast of the city of Kerman and about 25 kilometres east of the town of Mahan.

== Geology ==
Kuhbonan Mountain Range was formed mainly in the Miocene during the Alpine orogeny as the Arabian plate finally collided with the Iranian plate and consequently this region was pressed against the resistant Lut block. Kuhbonan Range is made chiefly of Triassic and Jurassic rocks in the northwestern part, Jurassic rocks in the central section, and Upper Cretaceous rocks in the southeastern region. Paleozoic rocks are found mostly in the northwestern and eastern parts of the northern section, and in the southwestern and eastern parts of the central section of the range.

== Climate ==
Because of its high elevation, the Kuhbonan Range has a mountain climate, completely different from the hot semi-desert climate of the region.
