= Juzuiyeh, Baft =

Juzuiyeh جوزوييه
- Village
- Location within Iran
- Coordinates: 29°03′24″N 56°38′58″E
- Country: Iran
- Province: Kerman
- County: Baft
- Bakhsh: Central
- Rural District: Dashtab

Population (2006)
  - Total: 52
- Time zone: UTC+3:30 (IRST)
  - Summer (DST): UTC+4:30 (IRDT)

Juzuiyeh (Persian: جوزوييه, also Romanized as Jūzū‘īyeh) is a village in Dashtab Rural District, in the Central District of Baft County, Kerman Province, Iran. At the 2006 census, its population was 52, in 14 families.
