= Qaleh Hashem Rural District =

Rural district in Qazvin province, Iran

Qaleh Hashem Rural District Persian: دهستان قلعه هاشم
- Rural District
- Location within Iran
- Coordinates: 35°53′N 49°46′E
- Country: Iran
- Province: Qazvin
- County: Buin Zahra
- District: Shal
- Established: 1997
- Capital: Shahrak-e Modarres

Population (2016)
  - Total: 3,765
- Time zone: UTC+3:30 (IRST)

Qaleh Hashem Rural District (Persian: دهستان قلعه هاشم) is in Shal District (Note: Formerly known as Dashtabi District) of Buin Zahra County, Qazvin province, Iran. Its capital is the village of Shahrak-e Modarres.

== Demographics ==
=== Population ===
At the time of the 2006 National Census, the rural district's population was 4,873 in 1,303 households. There were 4,218 inhabitants in 1,222 households at the following census of 2011. The 2016 census measured the population of the rural district as 3,765 in 1,198 households. The most populous of its four villages was Shahrak-e Modarres, with 2,267 people.

=== Other villages in the rural district ===
- Tazrak
