= Narcisse Bonan =

Ivorian footballer

Personal information
- Date of birth: August 3, 1984 (age 42)
- Place of birth: Yamoussoukro, Ivory Coast
- Height: 1.78 m (5 ft 10 in)
- Position: Striker

Senior career*
Years	Team	Apps	(Gls)
2003–2016	UJA Alfortville		
2006–2008	Boulogne	5	(0)
2008–2011	UJA Alfortville	49	(1)
- * Club domestic league appearances and goals

Narcisse Bonan (born August 3, 1984) is an Ivorian former professional footballer who played as a striker.
