= Eslamabad Rural District (Zarand County) =

Rural district in Kerman province, Iran

Eslamabad Rural District Persian: دهستان اسلام آباد
- Rural District
- Location within Iran
- Coordinates: 30°46′07″N 56°44′46″E
- Country: Iran
- Province: Kerman
- County: Zarand
- District: Central
- Capital: Reyhan Shahr

Population (2016)
  - Total: 1,136
- Time zone: UTC+3:30 (IRST)

Eslamabad Rural District (Persian: دهستان اسلام آباد) is in the Central District of Zarand County, Kerman province, Iran. It is administered from the city of Reyhan Shahr. (Note: Formerly the village of Eslamabad)

== Demographics ==
=== Population ===
At the time of the 2006 National Census, the rural district's population was 830 in 210 households. There were 837 inhabitants in 266 households at the following census of 2011. The 2016 census measured the population of the rural district as 1,136 in 357 households. The most populous of its 26 villages was Dahuiyeh, with 1,060 people.
