= Bao'an =

Bao'an may refer to:

- Bonan people, or Bao'an (保安族), an ethnic group living in Qinghai and Gansu
- Bao'an dialect, spoken in Shenzhen and the New Territories, Hong Kong

== Places in China ==
- Bao'an District (宝安区), Shenzhen
- Bao'an County (寶安縣), the predecessor of the modern city of Shenzhen and Hong Kong
  - Shenzhen Bao'an International Airport (深圳宝安国际机场), the main airport of Shenzhen
- Zhidan County, formerly named Bao'an (保安), in Shaanxi
  - Bao'an Subdistrict, Zhidan County, formerly Bao'an Town

Towns (保安镇)

- Bao'an, Lianzhou, Guangdong
- Bao'an, Ye County, Henan
- Bao'an, Daye, Hubei, in Daye City, Hubei

Townships (保安乡)

- Bao'an Township, Xiushan County, in Xiushan Tujia and Miao Autonomous County, Chongqing
- Bao'an Township, Du'an County, in Du'an Yao Autonomous County, Guangxi
- Bao'an Township, Ningyuan County, in Ningyuan County, Hunan
- Bao'an Township, Suqian, in Suyu District, Suqian, Jiangsu
- Bao'an Township, Jiangshan, Zhejiang
