= Zarand, Iran =

City in Kerman province, Iran

Zarand Persian: زرند
- City
- Location within Iran
- Coordinates: 30°48′39″N 56°33′57″E
- Country: Iran
- Province: Kerman
- County: Zarand
- District: Central

Population (2016)
  - Total: 60,370
- Time zone: UTC+3:30 (IRST)

Zarand (Persian: زرند) is a city in the Central District of Zarand County, Kerman province, Iran, serving as capital of both the county and the district.

== Demographics ==
=== Population ===
At the time of the 2006 National Census, the city's population was 54,745 in 12,992 households. The following census in 2011 counted 57,749 people in 15,461 households. The 2016 census measured the population of the city as 60,370 people in 16,722 households.

== Geography ==
=== Location ===
The city of Zarand is about 75 kilometres (47 mi) northwest of the provincial capital of Kerman. Southwest of Tehran, Iran, halfway between Tehran and Saveh, there is a plain also called Zarand.

A crater on Mars is named after this city.

=== Earthquakes ===
On 22 February 2005, a major earthquake killed hundreds of residents in the city of Zarand and several nearby villages in north Kerman province.
