= Tazrak =

Village in Qazvin province, Iran

Tazrak Persian: طزرک
- Village
- Location within Iran
- Coordinates: 35°52′02″N 49°46′28″E
- Country: Iran
- Province: Qazvin
- County: Buin Zahra
- District: Shal
- Rural District: Qaleh Hashem

Population (2016)
  - Total: 1,382
- Time zone: UTC+3:30 (IRST)

Tazrak (Persian: طزرک) (Note: Also romanized as Ţazarak and Ţazrak; also known as Tajārak) is a village in Qaleh Hashem Rural District of Shal District (Note: Formerly known as Dashtabi District) in Buin Zahra County, Qazvin province, Iran.

== Demographics ==
=== Population ===
At the time of the 2006 National Census, the village's population was 1,619 in 431 households. The following census in 2011 counted 1,745 people in 521 households. The 2016 census measured the population of the village as 1,382 people in 428 households. It was the most populous village in its rural district.
