= Yazdan Shahr =

City in Kerman province, Iran

Yazdan Shahr Persian: يزدان شهر
- City
- Location within Iran
- Coordinates: 30°51′56″N 56°22′08″E
- Country: Iran
- Province: Kerman
- County: Zarand
- District: Yazdanabad

Population (2016)
  - Total: 5,607
- Time zone: UTC+3:30 (IRST)

Yazdan Shahr (Persian: يزدان شهر) (Note: Also romanized as Yazdanshahr; formerly the village of Yazdanabad (یزدان آباد), also romanized as Yazdānābād and Yezdānābād) is a city in, and the capital of, Yazdanabad District of Zarand County, Kerman province, Iran. It also serves as the administrative center for Yazdanabad Rural District.

== History ==
In 2004, the village of Yazdanabad (یزدان‌آباد), after merging with the villages of Akbarabad (اکبرآباد), Deh-e Feyyaz (ده فیاض), Kahnuj (کهنوج‌), Khaleqabad (خالق‌آباد), Mohammadabad (محمدآباد), Salsabil (‌سلسبیل), Shahrak-e Shahid Rajai (شهرک شهید رجایی), and Taherabad (طاهرآباد), became the city of Yazdan Shahr.

== Demographics ==
=== Population ===
At the time of the 2006 National Census, the city's population was 5,037 in 1,149 households. The following census in 2011 counted 5,442 people in 1,396 households. The 2016 census measured the population of the city as 5,607 people in 1,572 households.
