= Reyhan Shahr =

City in Kerman province, Iran

Reyhan Shahr Persian: ريحان شهر
- City
- Location within Iran
- Coordinates: 30°44′19″N 56°43′40″E
- Country: Iran
- Province: Kerman
- County: Zarand
- District: Central

Population (2016)
  - Total: 4,580
- Time zone: UTC+3:30 (IRST)

Reyhan Shahr (Persian: ريحان شهر) (Note: Also romanized as Reyhanshahr; formerly the village of Eslamabad; also known as Bab Tangol (باب تنگل), also romanized as Bāb Tangal and Bāb Tangol; also known as Bab Tankal, Bab-Tanqal, and Dungal) is a city in the Central District of Zarand County, Kerman province, Iran, serving as the administrative center for Eslamabad Rural District.

== History ==
In 2004, the village of Eslamabad (اسلام‌آباد), after merging with the village of Bab Tengal-e Sofla (باب تنگل سفلی), became the city of Reyhan.

== Demographics ==
=== Population ===
At the time of the 2006 National Census, the city's population was 4,360 in 949 households. The following census in 2011 counted 4,791 people in 1,209 households. The 2016 census measured the population of the city as 4,580 people in 1,301 households.
