= Jiroft University =

University in Kerman province, Iran

University of Jiroft
- دانشگاه جيرفت
- Type: Public
- Established: 1989
- Chancellor: Omidali Esmaeilipour
- Location: Jiroft, Kerman province, Iran
- Campus: Urban
- Website: ujiroft.ac.ir

University of Jiroft (دانشگاه جيرفت, Daneshgah-e Jiroft) is a public, coeducational research university in Jiroft, Iran. It is 8 km from the city center.

This university launched its educational and research activities in 1988 as a college of Shahid Bahonar University, upon receiving the agreement of the Council for the Development of Higher Education. A fraction of graduated students of the university are selected for the top-ranked universities in the country.
