= Vahdat Rural District (Zarand County) =

Rural district in Kerman province, Iran

Vahdat Rural District Persian: دهستان وحدت
- Rural District
- Location within Iran
- Coordinates: 30°47′34″N 56°37′41″E
- Country: Iran
- Province: Kerman
- County: Zarand
- District: Central
- Capital: Bahaabad

Population (2016)
  - Total: 19,720
- Time zone: UTC+3:30 (IRST)

Vahdat Rural District (Persian: دهستان وحدت) is in the Central District of Zarand County, Kerman province, Iran. Its capital is the village of Bahaabad.

== Demographics ==
=== Population ===
At the time of the 2006 National Census, the rural district's population was 15,033 in 3,609 households. There were 18,078 inhabitants in 5,018 households at the following census of 2011. The 2016 census measured the population of the rural district as 19,720 in 5,690 households. The most populous of its 39 villages was Bahaabad, with 2,965 people.
