= Dasht-e Khak Rural District =

Rural district in Kerman province, Iran

Dasht-e Khak Rural District Persian: دهستان دشت خاك
- Rural District
- Location within Iran
- Coordinates: 31°06′06″N 56°32′40″E
- Country: Iran
- Province: Kerman
- County: Zarand
- District: Central
- Capital: Dasht-e Khak

Population (2016)
  - Total: 4,199
- Time zone: UTC+3:30 (IRST)

Dasht-e Khak Rural District (Persian: دهستان دشت خاك) is in the Central District of Zarand County, Kerman province, Iran. Its capital is the village of Dasht-e Khak.

== Demographics ==
=== Population ===
At the time of the 2006 National Census, the rural district's population was 4,060 in 1,042 households. There were 4,333 inhabitants in 1,271 households at the following census of 2011. The 2016 census measured the population of the rural district as 4,199 in 1,294 households. The most populous of its 105 villages was Dasht-e Khak, with 3,404 inhabitants.
