= Siriz Rural District =

Rural district in Kerman province, Iran

Siriz Rural District Persian: دهستان سيريز
- Rural District
- Location within Iran
- Coordinates: 31°02′35″N 55°54′49″E
- Country: Iran
- Province: Kerman
- County: Zarand
- District: Yazdanabad
- Capital: Sang

Population (2016)
  - Total: 4,841
- Time zone: UTC+3:30 (IRST)

Siriz Rural District (Persian: دهستان سيريز) is in Yazdanabad District of Zarand County, Kerman province, Iran. Its capital is the village of Sang. The previous capital of the rural district was the village of Siriz, now a city.

== Demographics ==
=== Population ===
At the time of the 2006 National Census, the rural district's population was 4,792 in 1,167 households. There were 5,048 inhabitants in 1,450 households at the following census of 2011. The 2016 census measured the population of the rural district as 4,841 in 1,472 households. The most populous of its 80 villages was Deh-e Now, with 962 people.
