= Hotkan Rural District =

Rural district in Kerman province, Iran

Hotkan Rural District Persian: دهستان حتكن
- Rural District
- Location within Iran
- Coordinates: 30°54′13″N 56°47′35″E
- Country: Iran
- Province: Kerman
- County: Zarand
- District: Central
- Capital: Hotkan

Area
  - Total: 1,133 km^{2} (437 sq mi)
- Elevation: 1,400 m (4,600 ft)

Population (2016)
  - Total: 898
  - Density: 0.793/km^{2} (2.05/sq mi)
- Time zone: UTC+3:30 (IRST)

Hotkan Rural District (Persian: دهستان حتكن) is in the Central District of Zarand County, Kerman province, Iran. Its capital is the village of Hotkan.

== Demographics ==
=== Population ===
At the time of the 2006 National Census, the rural district's population was 1,247 in 384 households. There were 679 inhabitants in 257 households at the following census of 2011. The 2016 census measured the population of the rural district as 898 in 311 households. The most populous of its 78 villages was Hotkan, with 253 people.
