= Yazdanabad Rural District =

Rural district in Kerman province, Iran

Yazdanabad Rural District Persian: دهستان يزدان آباد
- Rural District
- Location within Iran
- Coordinates: 30°52′02″N 56°21′05″E
- Country: Iran
- Province: Kerman
- County: Zarand
- District: Yazdanabad
- Capital: Yazdan Shahr

Population (2016)
  - Total: 4,096
- Time zone: UTC+3:30 (IRST)

Yazdanabad Rural District (Persian: دهستان يزدان آباد) is in Yazdanabad District of Zarand County, Kerman province, Iran. It is administered from the city of Yazdan Shahr. (Note: Formerly the village of Yazdanabad)

== Demographics ==
=== Population ===
At the time of the 2006 National Census, the rural district's population was 6,107 in 1,467 households. There were 6,625 inhabitants in 1,844 households at the following census of 2011. The 2016 census measured the population of the rural district as 4,096 in 1,186 households. The most populous of its 44 villages was Jalalabad, with 2,177 people.
