= Jorjafak Rural District =

Rural district in Kerman province, Iran

Jorjafak Rural District Persian: دهستان جرجافك
- Rural District
- Location within Iran
- Coordinates: 30°41′57″N 56°16′37″E
- Country: Iran
- Province: Kerman
- County: Zarand
- District: Central
- Capital: Jorjafak

Population (2016)
  - Total: 2,393
- Time zone: UTC+3:30 (IRST)

Jorjafak Rural District (Persian: دهستان جرجافك) is in the Central District of Zarand County, Kerman province, Iran. Its capital is the village of Jorjafak.

== Demographics ==
=== Population ===
At the time of the 2006 National Census, the rural district's population was 2,382 in 724 households. There were 1,973 inhabitants in 626 households at the following census of 2011. The 2016 census measured the population of the rural district as 2,393 in 813 households. The most populous of its 104 villages was Jorjafak, with 1,093 people.
