= Sarbanan Rural District =

Rural district in Kerman province, Iran

Sarbanan Rural District Persian: دهستان سربنان
- Rural District
- Location within Iran
- Coordinates: 30°57′28″N 56°39′11″E
- Country: Iran
- Province: Kerman
- County: Zarand
- District: Central
- Capital: Ahmadi

Population (2016)
  - Total: 2,706
- Time zone: UTC+3:30 (IRST)

Sarbanan Rural District (Persian: دهستان سربنان) is in the Central District of Zarand County, Kerman province, Iran. Its capital is the village of Ahmadi.

== Demographics ==
=== Population ===
At the time of the 2006 National Census, the rural district's population was 2,817 in 755 households. There were 2,263 inhabitants in 693 households at the following census of 2011. The 2016 census measured the population of the rural district as 2,706 in 849 households. The most populous of its 111 villages was Isaabad, with 665 people.
