= Yazdanabad District =

District in Kerman province, Iran

Yazdanabad District Persian: بخش یزدان‌آباد
- District
- Location within Iran
- Coordinates: 31°00′16″N 56°03′52″E
- Country: Iran
- Province: Kerman
- County: Zarand
- Capital: Yazdan Shahr

Population (2016)
  - Total: 16,927
- Time zone: UTC+3:30 (IRST)

Yazdanabad District (Persian: بخش یزدان‌آباد) is in Zarand County, Kerman province, Iran. Its capital is the city of Yazdan Shahr.

== History ==
After the 2006 National Census, Shaab Jereh Rural District was separated from Kuhbanan County to join Zarand County. After the 2016 census, the village of Siriz was elevated to the status of a city.

== Demographics ==
=== Population ===
At the time of the 2006 census, the district's population was 15,936 in 3,783 households. The following census in 2011 counted 18,905 people in 5,246 households. The 2016 census measured the population of the district as 16,927 inhabitants in 4,980 households.

=== Administrative divisions ===
Yazdanabad District Population
| Administrative Divisions | 2006 | 2011 | 2016 |
|---|---|---|---|
| Shaab Jereh RD (Note: Transferred from Kuhbanan County) | | 1,790 | 2,383 |
| Siriz RD | 4,792 | 5,048 | 4,841 |
| Yazdanabad RD | 6,107 | 6,625 | 4,096 |
| Siriz (city) (Note: Became a city after the 2016 census) | | | |
| Yazdan Shahr (city) (Note: Formerly the village of Yazdanabad) | 5,037 | 5,442 | 5,607 |
| Total | 15,936 | 18,905 | 16,927 |
RD = Rural District
