= Central District (Zarand County) =

District in Kerman province, Iran

Central District (Zarand County) Persian: بخش مرکزی شهرستان زرند
- District
- Location within Iran
- Coordinates: 30°53′00″N 56°34′04″E
- Country: Iran
- Province: Kerman
- County: Zarand
- Capital: Zarand

Population (2016)
  - Total: 121,206
- Time zone: UTC+3:30 (IRST)

The Central District of Zarand County (Persian: بخش مرکزی شهرستان زرند) is in Kerman province, Iran. Its capital is the city of Zarand.

== Demographics ==
=== Population ===
At the time of the 2006 National Census, the district's population was 103,208 in 24,963 households. The following census in 2011 counted 110,199 people in 30,179 households. The 2016 census measured the population of the district as 121,206 inhabitants in 34,471 households.

=== Administrative divisions ===
Central District (Zarand County) Population
Administrative Divisions	2006	2011	2016
Dasht-e Khak RD	4,060	4,333	4,199
Eslamabad RD	830	837	1,136
Hotkan RD	1,247	679	898
Jorjafak RD	2,382	1,973	2,393
Khanuk RD	900	944	1,136
Mohammadabad RD	13,252	16,399	21,440
Sarbanan RD	2,817	2,263	2,706
Vahdat RD	15,033	18,078	19,720
Khanuk (city)	3,582	2,153	2,628
Reyhan Shahr (city) (Note: Formerly the village of Eslamabad)	4,360	4,791	4,580
Zarand (city)	54,745	57,749	60,370
Total	103,208	110,199	121,206
RD = Rural District
