= Zarand County =

County in Kerman province, Iran

Zarand County Persian: شهرستان زرند
- County
- Location of Zarand County in Kerman province (top, green)

- Location of Kerman province in Iran
- Coordinates: 30°57′N 56°21′E
- Country: Iran
- Province: Kerman
- Capital: Zarand
- Districts: Central, Yazdanabad

Population (2016)
  - Total: 138,133
- Time zone: UTC+3:30 (IRST)

Zarand County (Persian: شهرستان زرند) is in Kerman province, Iran. Its capital is the city of Zarand.

== History ==
After the 2006 National Census, Shaab Jereh Rural District was separated from Kuhbanan County to join Zarand County. After the 2016 census, the village of Siriz was elevated to the status of a city.

== Demographics ==
=== Population ===
At the time of the 2006 census, the county's population was 119,144 in 28,746 households. The following census in 2011 counted 129,104 people in 35,388 households, The 2016 census measured the population of the county as 138,133 in 39,451 households.

=== Administrative divisions ===
Zarand County's population history and administrative structure over three consecutive censuses are shown in the following table.

Zarand County Population
Administrative Divisions	2006	2011	2016
Central District	103,208	110,199	121,206
Dasht-e Khak RD	4,060	4,333	4,199
Eslamabad RD	830	837	1,136
Hotkan RD	1,247	679	898
Jorjafak RD	2,382	1,973	2,393
Khanuk RD	900	944	1,136
Mohammadabad RD	13,252	16,399	21,440
Sarbanan RD	2,817	2,263	2,706
Vahdat RD	15,033	18,078	19,720
Khanuk (city)	3,582	2,153	2,628
Reyhan Shahr (city) (Note: Formerly the village of Eslamabad)	4,360	4,791	4,580
Zarand (city)	54,745	57,749	60,370
Yazdanabad District	15,936	18,905	16,927
Shaab Jereh RD (Note: Transferred from Kuhbanan County)		1,790	2,383
Siriz RD	4,792	5,048	4,841
Yazdanabad RD	6,107	6,625	4,096
Siriz (city) (Note: Became a city after the 2016 census)			
Yazdan Shahr (city) (Note: Formerly the village of Yazdanabad)	5,037	5,442	5,607
Total	119,144	129,104	138,133
RD = Rural District

== See also ==
Media related to Zarand County at Wikimedia Commons
