= Kerman province =

Province of Iran

Kerman Province استان کرمان (Persian)
- Province
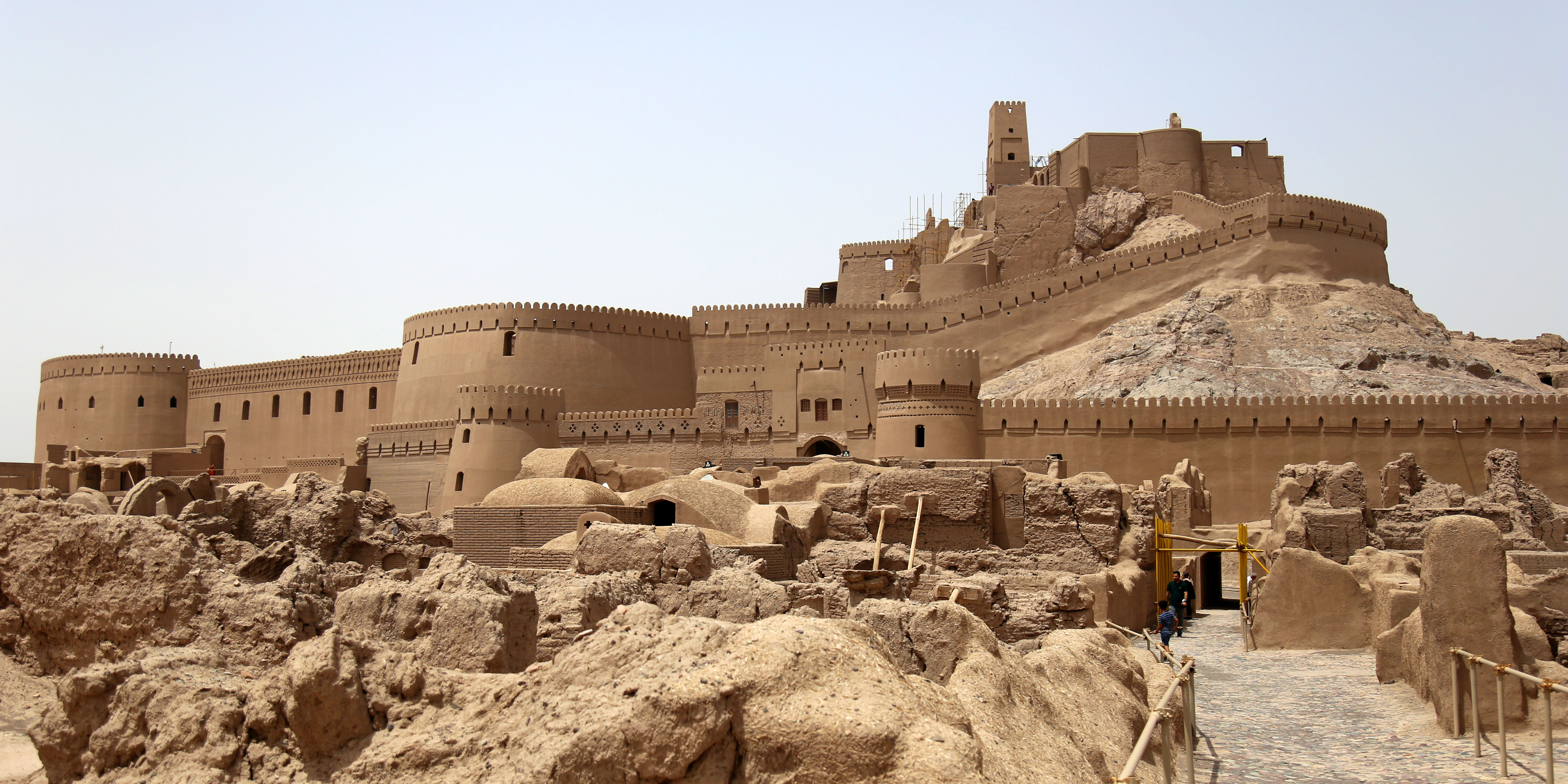
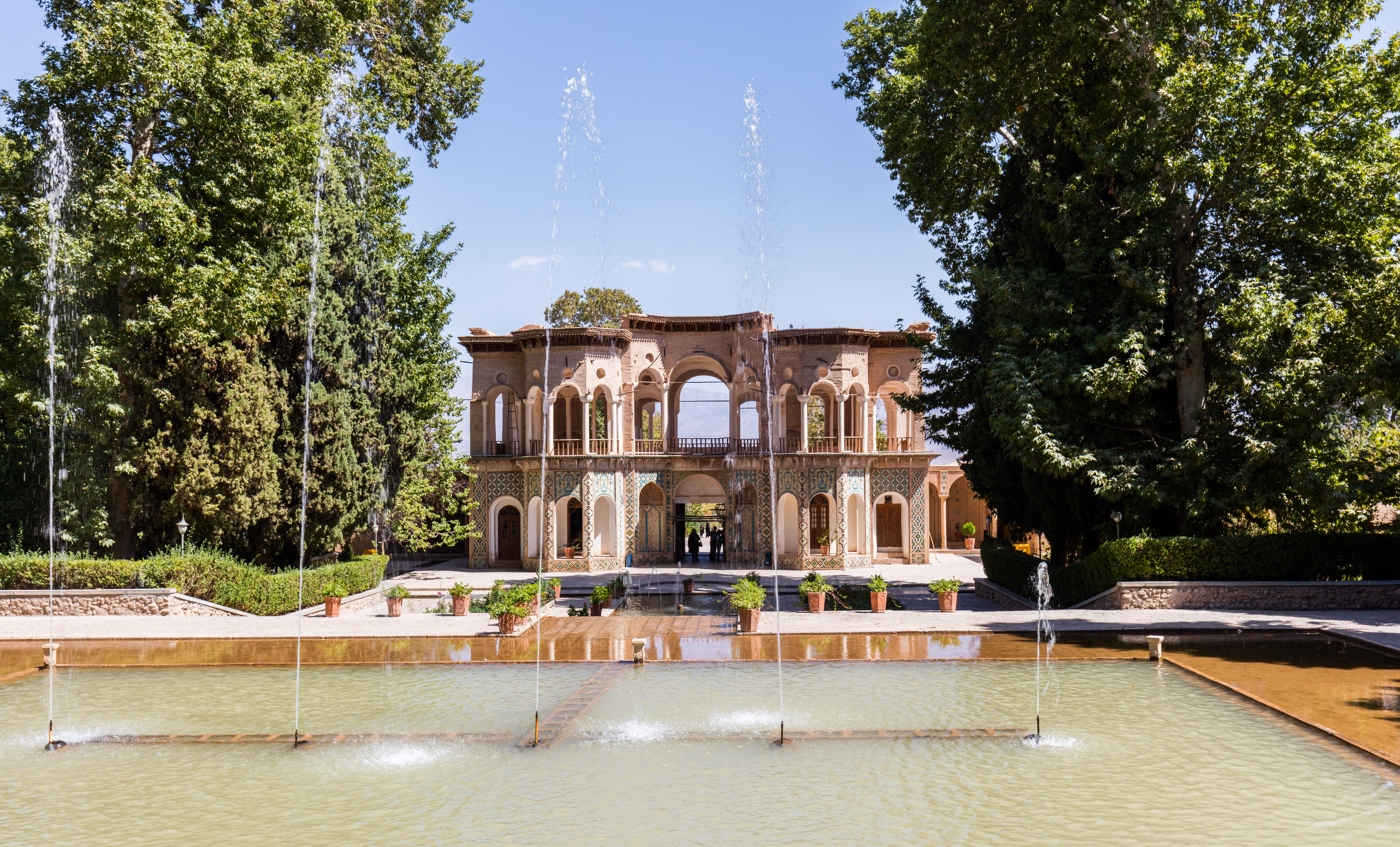
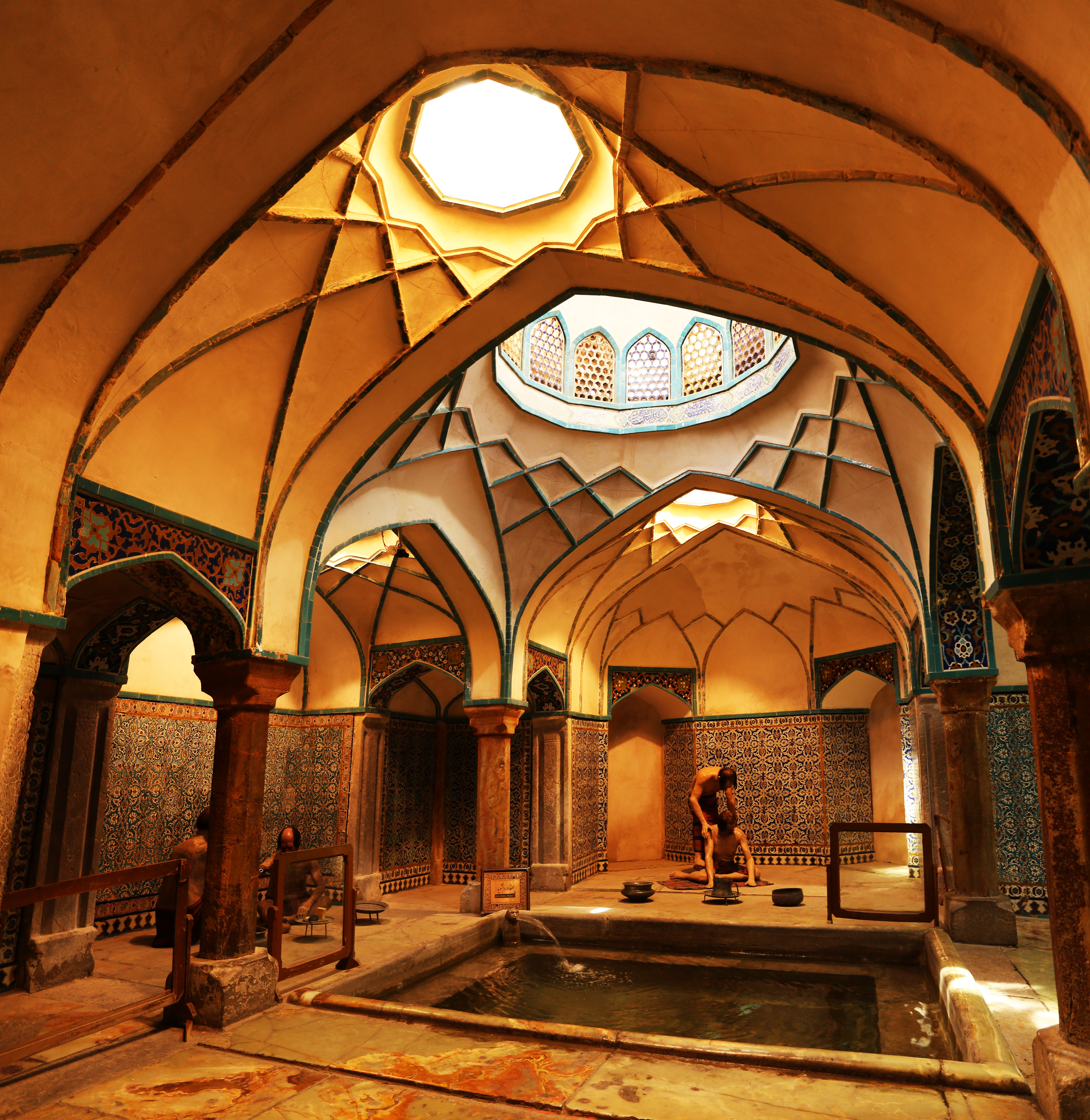
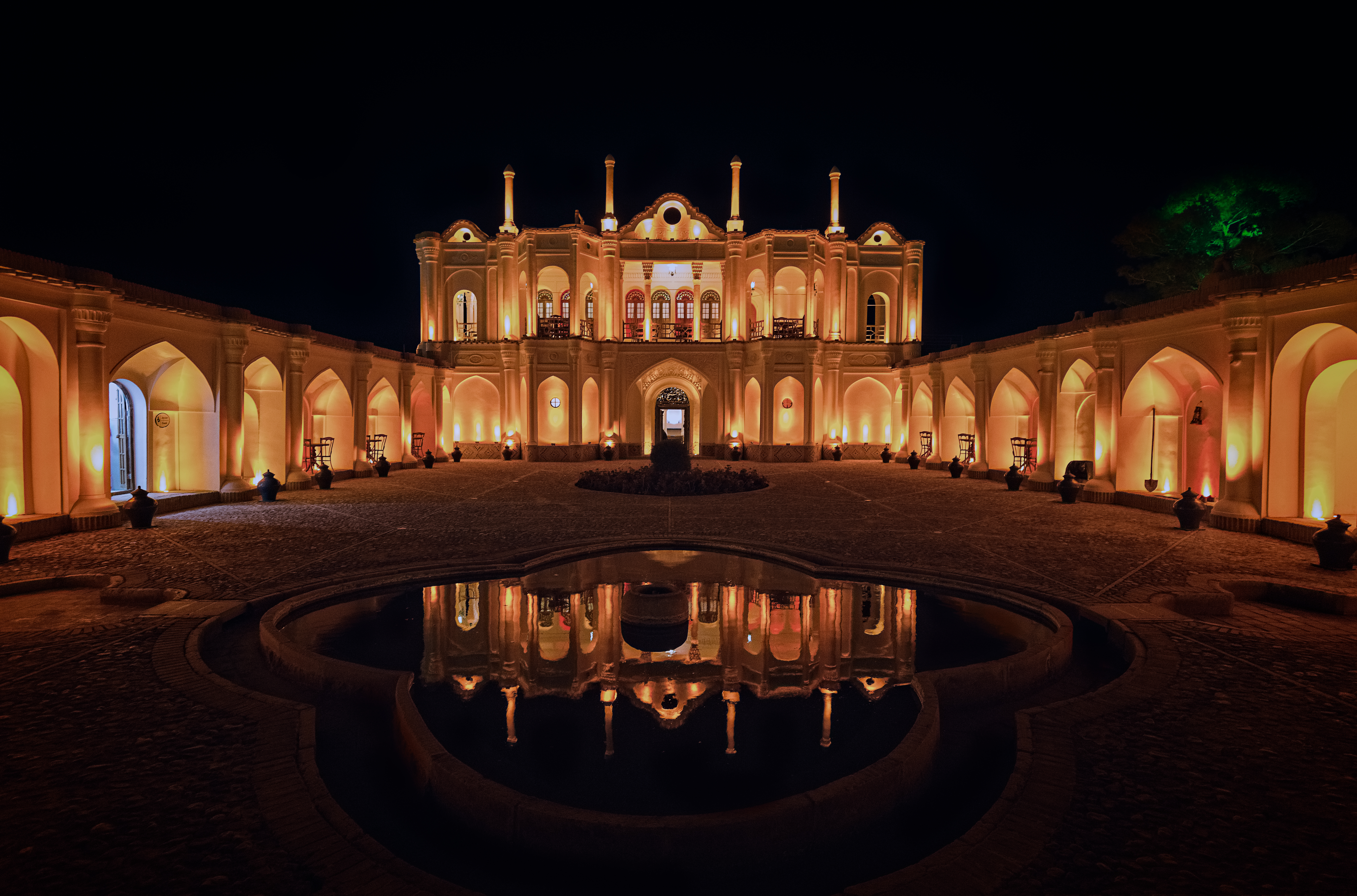
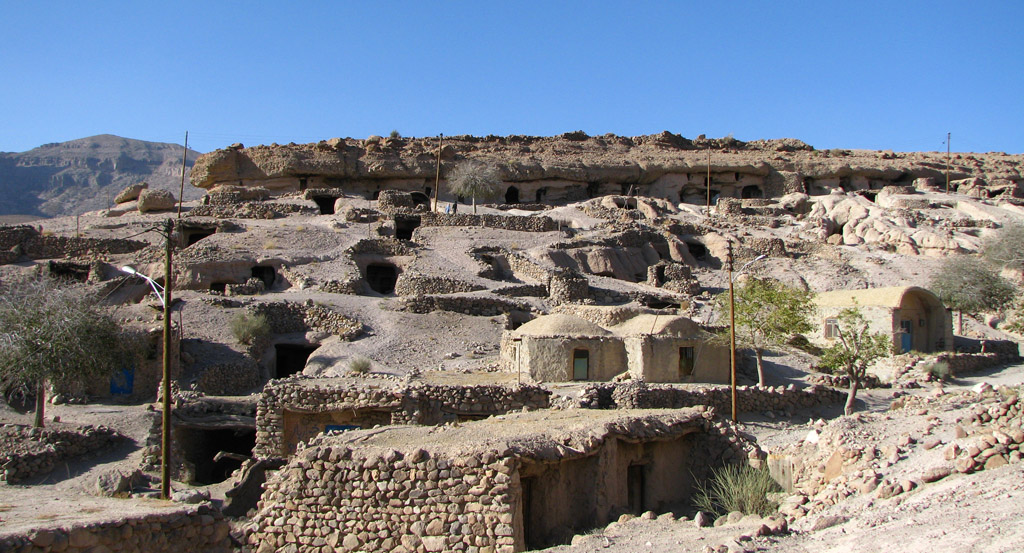
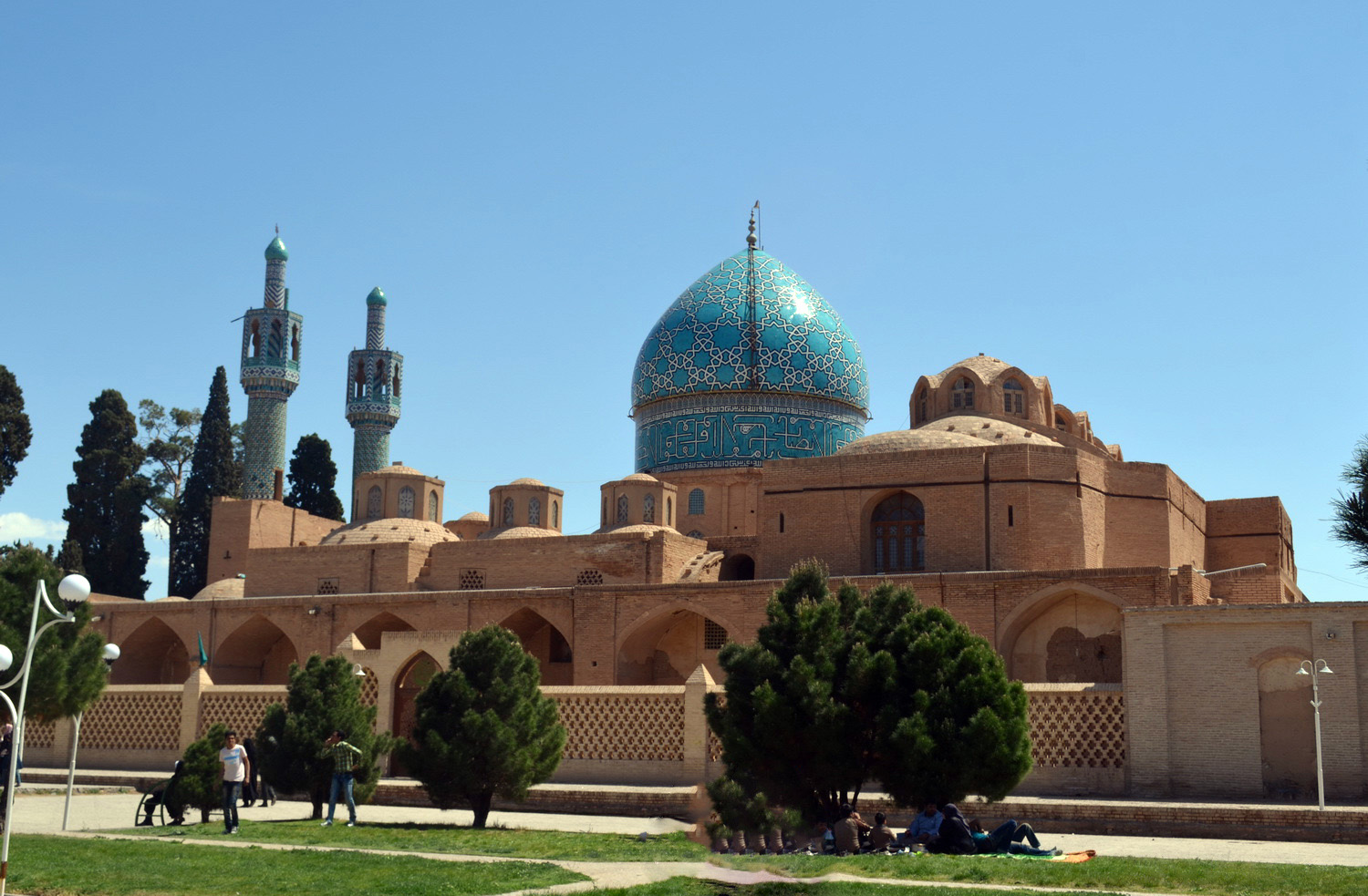

- Location of Kerman province within Iran
- Coordinates: 29°13′N 57°26′E
- Country: Iran
- Region: Region 5
- Capital: Kerman
- Counties: 25

Government
  - Governor-general: Mohammad Ali Talebi (Independent)

Area
  - Total: 183,285 km^{2} (70,767 sq mi)
- Elevation: 192 m (630 ft)

Population (2016)
  - Total: 3,164,718
  - Density: 17.2667/km^{2} (44.7204/sq mi)
- Time zone: UTC+03:30 (IRST)
- ISO 3166 code: IR-08
- Main language(s): Persian
- HDI (2017): 0.778 high · 20th
- Website: www.gov.kr.ir

Kerman province (Note: Also romanized as Kirman, Karmana, Kermân, and Kermun; known in ancient times as the satrapy of Carmania) (Persian: استان کرمان, romanized: Estan Karman; [kʲeɾˈmɒːn]) (Note: Also romanized as Ostān-e Kermān) is the largest of the 31 provinces of Iran. Its capital is the city of Kerman.

The province is in the southeast of Iran. In 2014 it was placed in Region 5. Mentioned in ancient times as the Achaemenid satrapy of Carmania, Kerman province has an area of 183,285 km^{2} (70,767 sq mi), encompassing nearly 11% of the land area of Iran.

== History ==
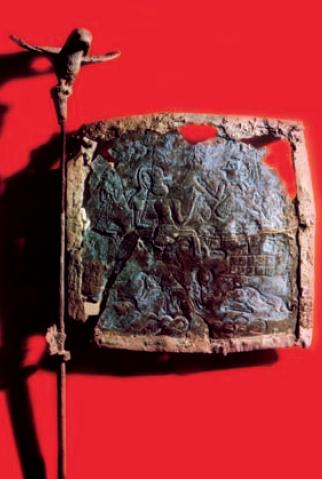
Bronze flag, Shahdad Kerman, Iran, 3rd millennium BC

In ancient times, Kerman was known as Carmania. According to a text from the 8th century commonly attributed to the Armenian historian Movses Khorenatsi, present-day Kerman province was situated in the southern quarter of the Sasanian Empire. The main city of the region from the Sasanian era to the 10th century was Sirjan.

Early Muslim geographers considered the area as part of the hot climatic zone and the mountainous interior as home of predatory people including the Kufečs (or Kofejān). Hamdallah Mustawfi stated that predatory beasts roamed the area which by then had undergone forestation.

During the Arab conquest of Iran, a part of the Iranian population of Kirman was nomadic, such as the Baloch who lived in the western mountains. The Arabs also dealt with Baloch, who had seemingly occupied many parts of Kerman just before the arrival of the Arabs.

In the 13th century it came under the rule of the Qutlugh-Khanids founded by ethnic Khitans, than under the Mongol Empire. It was under the Timurid empire in 15th century.

== Demographics ==
=== Language ===
The main languages of Kerman province are standard Persian (95%) and Garmsiri and Achomi Persian dialects. Smaller languages include, Turkic dialects and a Persian Median-type dialect spoken by the Jewish and Zoroastrian communities.

The Iranian dialects of Kerman province are close enough to each other to be held to constitute but a single Kermani dialect - which, in turn, is sufficiently close to Standard Persian as to be mutually intelligible with it.

=== Population ===
At the time of the 2006 National Census, the province's population was 2,584,834 in 612,996 households. The 2011 census recorded a population of 2,938,988 people (1,482,339 male and 1,456,649 female) in 785,747 households. Urban areas accounted for 1,684,982 people, whereas 1,242,344 lived in rural vicinities; 6,082 were non-residents. The 2016 census measured the population of the province as 3,164,718 in 932,721 households.

According to demographic data from 2008, the tribes of Kerman, of various origins, included Al-e Sa'idi, Khorasani, Balochi, Kuh-e Panji, Qarachi, Ma'sumi-Shul, Bichaqchi, Soleymani, Afshar, Lori, Taheri, Fathi, Narubi, and Jebalbarezi. The most significant nomadic tribal groups among them were the Baloch, Jebalbarezi, and Afshar.

The capital city of Kerman, with a population of 537,718, comprises about 29% of the provincial urban population of 1.85 million, being the most developed and largest city of the province.

=== Administrative divisions ===

The population history and structural changes of Kerman province's administrative divisions over three consecutive censuses are shown in the following table.

Kerman Province
Counties	2006	2011	2016
Anar (Note: Separated from Rafsanjan County after the 2006 census)	—	35,295	36,897
Anbarabad	113,751	85,942	82,438
Arzuiyeh (Note: Separated from Baft County after the 2006 census)	—	41,979	38,510
Baft	138,847	75,940	84,103
Bam	277,835	195,603	228,241
Bardsir	84,543	73,738	81,983
Fahraj (Note: Separated from Bam County after the 2006 census)	—	68,038	67,096
Faryab (Note: Separated from Kahnuj County after the 2006 census)	—	34,417	34,000
Gonbaki (Note: Separated from Rigan County after the 2016 census)	—	—	—
Jazmurian (Note: Separated from Rudbar-e Jonubi County after the 2016 census)	—	—	—
Jiroft	181,300	277,748	308,858
Kahnuj	102,269	86,290	95,848
Kerman	654,052	722,484	738,724
Kuhbanan	24,465	21,721	21,205
Manujan	63,270	64,528	65,705
Narmashir (Note: Separated from Bam County after the 2006 census)	—	58,229	54,228
Qaleh Ganj	69,008	76,376	76,495
Rabor (Note: Separated from Baft County after the 2006 census)	—	34,392	35,362
Rafsanjan	291,417	287,921	311,214
Ravar	38,539	40,295	43,198
Rigan (Note: Separated from Bam County after the 2006 census)	—	66,335	88,410
Rudbar-e Jonubi	86,747	104,421	105,992
Shahr-e Babak	100,192	90,495	103,975
Sirjan	239,455	267,697	324,103
Zarand	119,144	129,104	138,133
Total	2,584,834	2,938,988	3,164,718

=== Cities ===
According to the 2016 census, 1,858,587 people (over 58% of the population of Kerman province) live in the following cities:

City	Population
Aminshahr	4,413
Anar	15,532
Anbarabad	18,185
Anduhjerd	4,041
Arzuiyeh	6,868
Baft	34,517
Baghin	10,407
Bahreman	5,265
Balvard	3,534
Bam	127,396
Baravat	22,761
Bardsir	25,152
Bezenjan	4,517
Boluk	5,304
Chatrud	5,860
Darb-e Behesht	10,670
Dashtkar	3,234
Dehaj	5,045
Dow Sari	4,130
Ekhtiarabad	9,840
Fahraj	6,876
Faryab	4,863
Golbaf	9,205
Golzar	5,445
Gonbaki	7,210
Hamashahr	3,311
Hanza	1,452
Hojedk	1,007
Jebalbarez	6,750
Jiroft	130,429
Jowzam	3,436
Jupar	3,607
Kahnuj	52,624
Kazemabad	4,060
Kerman	537,718
Khanuk	2,628
Khatunabad	5,471
Khursand	8,252
Khvajeh Shahr	2,478
Kian Shahr	4,543
Koshkuiyeh	7,644
Kuhbanan	10,761
Lalehzar	4,429
Mahan	19,423
Manujan	15,634
Mardehek	2,870
Mes-e Sarcheshmeh	5,967
Mohammadabad	20,720
Mohiabad	3,930
Najafabad	20,164
Narmashir	5,222
Negar	7,600
Nezamshahr	2,426
Nowdezh	5,562
Qaleh Ganj	13,169
Pariz	8,005
Rabor	13,263
Rafsanjan	161,909
Ravar	22,729
Rayen	10,286
Reyhan Shahr	4,580
Rudbar	14,747
Safayyeh	2,478
Shahdad	5,217
Shahr-e Babak	51,620
Sirjan	199,704
Yazdan Shahr	5,607
Zangiabad	8,568
Zarand	60,370
Zeh-e Kalut	6,835
Zeydabad	9,112

=== Most populous cities ===
The following sorted table, lists the most populous cities in Kerman.

Rank	City	County	Population
1	Kerman	Kerman	537,718
2	Sirjan	Sirjan	199,704
3	Rafsanjan	Rafsanjan	161,909
4	Jiroft	Jiroft	130,429
5	Bam	Bam	127,396
6	Zarand	Zarand	60,370
7	Kahnuj	Kahnuj	52,624
8	Shahr-e Babak	Shahr-e Babak	51,620
9	Baft	Baft	34,517
10	Bardsir	Bardsir	25,152

== Geography ==
The altitudes and heights of the province are the continuation of the central mountain ranges of Iran. They extend from the volcanic folds beginning in Azerbaijan and, by branching out in the central plateau of Iran, terminate in Baluchestan. These mountain ranges have brought about vast plains in the province. The Bashagard and Kuhbonan Mountains are the highest in this region and include peaks such as Toghrol, Aljerd, Palvar, Sirach, Abareq and Tahrood. Other ranges that stretch out from Yazd to Kerman and Challeh-ye-Jazmoorian include high peaks like Hazaran which is 4,501 meters above sea level (ASL), Kuh-e Shah 4,402 meters ASL, Joupar, Bahr Aseman and Khabr mountain in Khabr National Park and others.

Most of the province is largely steppe or sandy desert, although there are some oases where dates, oranges (said to be the best in Iran), and pistachios are cultivated. In antiquity "Carmanian" wine was famed for its quality [Strabo XV.2.14 (cap. 726)]. The province is dependent on qanats (underground water channels) for its irrigation. In the central parts, Mount Hezar is the highest peak, 4501 meters above sea level.

Kerman is prone to natural disasters. A recent flood for example, unearthed the archeological ancient city of Jiroft, in the south of Kerman province. Arg-é Bam on the other hand, the world's largest adobe structure, was destroyed in an earthquake in December 2003. On February 22, 2005, a major earthquake killed hundreds of residents in the town of Zarand and several nearby villages in north Kerman.

== Economy ==
As of 1920, the province was known for the quality of its caraway.

Arg e Jadid, is a specially designated economic zone of Iran, located in Kerman province.

The Gol Gohar mine, the largest iron mine in Iran, is located in Kerman province.

== Education ==
=== Colleges and universities ===
Kerman province contains the following universities:

- Jiroft University
- Kerman University of Medical Sciences
- Shahid Bahonar University of Kerman
- Sirjan University of Technology

== See also ==
- Kirman (Sasanian province)
- Kerman Province parliamentary districts (related to the Islamic Consultative Assembly)
- List of monuments in Kerman Province
- Carmania (satrapy)
- Dalfard
- Media related to Kerman Province at Wikimedia Commons
