= Mohammadabad =

Mohammadabad (Persian: محمداباد) may refer to:

== India ==
- Mohammadabad, Farrukhabad
- Mohammadabad, Ghazipur

== Iran ==
=== Alborz province ===
- Mohammadabad-e Afshar, a village in Chaharbagh County
- Mohammadabad, former name of Mohammadshahr, a city in Karaj County
- Mohammadabad Rural District (Karaj County), an administrative division
- Mohammadabad, Alborz, a village in Nazarabad County
- Mohammadabad-e Afkham ol Dowleh, a village in Nazarabad County

=== Ardabil province ===
- Mohammadabad, Ardabil, a village in Meshgin Shahr County

=== Bushehr province ===
- Mohammadabad, Bushehr, a village in Dashti County

=== Chaharmahal and Bakhtiari province ===
- Mohammadabad-e Yek, a village in Kuhrang County
- Mohammadabad-e Tabatabayi, a village in Saman County
- Mohammadabad, Chaharmahal and Bakhtiari, a village in Shahrekord County

=== East Azerbaijan province ===
- Mohammadabad, East Azerbaijan, a village in Hurand County

=== Fars province ===
- Mohammadabad, Abadeh, a village in Abadeh County
- Mohammadabad, Forg, a village in Darab County
- Mohammadabad, Hashivar, a village in Darab County
- Mohammadabad, Qaleh Biyaban, a village in Darab County
- Mohammadabad, Estahban, a village in Estahban County
- Mohammadabad, Fasa, a village in Fasa County
- Mohammadabad, Jereh and Baladeh, a village in Kazerun County
- Mohammadabad, Deris, a village in Kazerun County
- Mohammadabad, Khafr, alternate name of Mahmudabad, Khafr, a village in Khafr County
- Mohammadabad, Kharameh, alternate name of Jahanabad, Kharameh, a village in Kharameh County
- Mohammadabad-e Maz, alternate name of Maz, a village in Khonj County
- Mohammadabad, Marvdasht, a village in Marvdasht County
- Mohammadabad Rural District (Marvdasht County), an administrative division
- Mohammadabad, Neyriz, a village in Neyriz County
- Mohammadabad-e Sofla, Fars, a village in Neyriz County
- Mohammadabad, Sarchehan, a village in Sarchehan County

=== Gilan province ===
- Mohammadabad, Gilan, a village in Rasht County

=== Golestan province ===
- Mohammadabad, Aliabad, a village in Aliabad-e Katul County
- Mohammadabad, Aqqala, a village in Aqqala County
- Mohammadabad-e Bala, a village in Aqqala County
- Mohammadabad-e Pain, Golestan, a village in Aqqala County
- Mohammadabad, Bandar-e Gaz, a village in Bandar-e Gaz County
- Mohammadabad, Galikash, a village in Galikash County
- Mohammadabad, Gonbad-e Qabus, a village in Gonbad-e Kavus County
- Mohammadabad, Gorgan, a village in Gorgan County
- Mohammadabad, Kordkuy, a village in Kordkuy County
- Mohammadabad, Minudasht, a village in Minudasht County
- Mohammadabad, Ramian, a village in Ramian County

=== Hamadan province ===
- Mohammadabad, Hamadan, a village in Asadabad County
- Muhammadabad, Kabudarahang, alternate name of Mahmudabad, Kabudarahang, a village in Kabudarahang County
- Mohammadabad, Giyan, alternate name of Mahanabad, a village in Nahavand County
- Mohammadabad, Nahavand, alternate name of Mohammadabad-e Chulak, a village in Nahavand County

=== Hormozgan province ===
- Mohammadabad, Bandar Abbas, a village in Bandar Abbas County
- Mohammadabad, Hajjiabad, a village in Hajjiabad County
- Mohammadabad-e Kahuri, a village in Hajjiabad County
- Mohammadabad, Jask, a village in Jask County
- Shahrak-e Mohammadabad, a village in Jask County
- Mohammadabad, Rudan, a village in Rudan County

=== Ilam province ===
- Mohammadabad, Ilam, alternate name of Ahmadabad, Ilam, a village in Dehloran County

=== Isfahan province ===
==== Aran and Bidgol County ====
- Mohammadabad, Kavirat, a village
- Mohammadabad, Sefiddasht, a village

==== Jarqavieh County ====
- Mohammadabad, Jarqavieh, a city

==== Nain County ====
- Mohammadabad, Nain, a village

=== Kerman province ===
==== Anbarabad County ====
- Mohammadabad Rural District (Anbarabad County), an administrative division

==== Arzuiyeh County ====
- Mohammadabad, Arzuiyeh, a village

==== Bam County ====
- Mohammadabad-e Seyyed Nezam, a village

==== Bardsir County ====
- Mohammadabad, Bardsir, alternate name of Mohammadabad-e Gazuiyeh, a village

==== Fahraj County ====
- Mohammadabad, Fahraj, a village
- Mohammadabad-e Deh Gavi, a village

==== Gonbaki County ====
- Mohammadabad-e Gonbaki, a city

==== Jazmurian County ====
- Mohammadabad-e Kataki, Iran, a village

==== Jiroft County ====
- Mohammadabad, alternate name of Mahmudabad Mazaheri, a village
- Mohammadabad, Jiroft, a village
- Mohammadabad-e Bab Skakan, a village
- Mohammadabad-e Do, Jiroft, a village
- Mohammadabad-e Anbari, a village
- Mohammadabad-e Hishin, alternate name of Hishin-e Olya, a village
- Mohammadabad-e Kalantar, a village
- Mohammadabad-e Olya, Kerman, a village
- Mohammadabad-e Sofla, Kerman, a village

==== Kahnuj County ====
- Mohammadabad, Kahnuj, alternate name of Mahmudabad-e Azali, a village

==== Kerman County ====
- Mohammadabad, Baghin, a village
- Mohammadabad, Rayen, a village
- Mohammadabad, Shahdad, alternate name of Rudkhaneh, Kerman, a village

==== Kuhbanan County ====
- Mohammadabad, Khorramdasht, alternate name of Qaryeh Ali, a village

==== Manujan County ====
- Mohammadabad, Manujan, a village

==== Narmashir County ====
- Mohammadabad-e Ab Shirin, a village
- Mohammadabad-e Geluski, a village
- Mohammadabad-e Moshk, a village
- Mohammadabad-e Qaleh Shahid, a village
- Mohammadabad-e Seyyed, a village
- Mohammadabad-e Sheykh, a village

==== Qaleh Ganj County ====
- Mohammadabad, former name of Qaleh Ganj, a city

==== Rabor County ====
- Mohammadabad, Rabor, a village

==== Rafsanjan County ====
- Mohammadabad, Azadegan, alternate name of Mohammadabad-e Mokhtar-e Yek, a village
- Mohammadabad, Ferdows, alternate name of Mohammadabad-e Herati, a village
- Mohammadabad, Rafsanjan, a village
- Mohammadabad, Razmavaran, alternate name of Mohammadabad-e Dehnow, a village
- Mohammadabad, Sharifabad, alternate name of Mahmudabad, Rafsanjan, a village
- Mohammadabad-e Barkhordar, a village
- Mohammadabad-e Meysam, a village
- Mohammadabad-e Saqi, a village
- Mohammadabad-e Seyyed Jalal, a village

==== Rigan County ====
- Mohammadabad, Kerman, a city
- Mohammadabad (village), Rigan
- Mohammadabad-e Asghar Khan, a village
- Mohammadabad-e Chah-e Malek, a village
- Mohammadabad-e Rud Shur, a village
- Mohammadabad-e Sar Haddi, a village

==== Rudbar-e Jonubi County ====
- Mohammadabad-e Do Ziyarati, a village

==== Shahr-e Babak County ====
- Mohammadabad, Dehaj, a village
- Mohammadabad, Estabraq, alternate name of Mohammadabad-e Shokur, a village
- Mohammadabad, Khabar, a village
- Mohammadabad, Pa Qaleh, a village
- Mohammadabad-e Seyyedha, a village

==== Sirjan County ====
- Mohammadabad, Balvard, alternate name of Mohammadabad-e Tezerj, a village
- Mohammadabad-e Darvish, a village

==== Zarand County ====
- Mohammadabad, Shaab Jereh, a village
- Mohammadabad, Zarand, a village
- Mohammadabad-e Golshan, a village
- Mohammadabad Rural District (Zarand County), an administrative division

=== Kermanshah province ===
- Mohammadabad, Harsin, a village in Harsin County
- Mohammadabad, Kangavar, a village in Kangavar County
- Mohammadabad, Sahneh, a village in Sahneh County

=== Khuzestan province ===
- Mohammadabad, Andika, a village in Andika County
- Mohammadabad, Bagh-e Malek, a village in Bagh-e Malek County
- Mohammadabad, Behbahan, a village in Behbahan County
- Mohammadabad, Lali, alternate name of Harkaleh-ye Mohammadabad, a village in Lali County
- Mohammadabad, Masjed Soleyman, a village in Masjed Soleyman County

=== Kohgiluyeh and Boyer-Ahmad province ===
- Mohammadabad, Boyer-Ahmad, alternate name of Mohammadabad-e Salehan, a village in Boyer-Ahmad County
- Mohammadabad, Sarrud-e Jonubi, alternate name of Mohammadabad-e Ashur Pashur, a village in Boyer-Ahmad County
- Mohammadabad, Sarrud-e Shomali, alternate name of Mohammadabad-e Tang Seh Riz, a village in Boyer-Ahmad County
- Mohammadabad, Gachsaran, alternate name of Mohammadabad-e Lishtar, a village in Gachsaran County
- Mohammadabad, Kohgiluyeh, a village in Kohgiluyeh County

=== Kurdistan province ===
- Mohammadabad, Bijar, a village in Bijar County
- Mohammadabad-e Ali Akbar Khan, a village in Bijar County
- Mohammadabad-e Nil, a village in Bijar County
- Mohammadabad, Bolbanabad, alternate name of Meymunabad, a village in Dehgolan County
- Mohammadabad, Dehgolan, alternate name of Mohammadabad-e Kharzeh, a village in Dehgolan County
- Mohammadabad, Divandarreh, alternate name of Mahmudeh, a village in Divandarreh County
- Mohammadabad, Bilavar, alternate name of Partaleh, a village in Kamyaran County
- Mohammadabad, Kamyaran, alternate name of Mohammadabad-e Kareyan, a village in Kamyaran County

=== Lorestan province ===
- Mohammadabad, Aligudarz, a village in Aligudarz County
- Mohammadabad, Borujerd, alternate name of Magasan-e Olya, a village in Borujerd County
- Mohammadabad, Delfan, a village in Delfan County
- Mohammadabad, Khorramabad, a village in Khorramabad County
- Mohammadabad-e Garavand, a village in Rumeshkan County
- Mohammadabad, Selseleh, a village in Selseleh County

=== Markazi province ===
- Mohammadabad, Khomeyn, a village in Khomeyn County
- Mohammadabad, Khondab, a village in Khondab County
- Mohammadabad, Mahallat, a village in Mahallat County
- Mohammadabad, Tafresh, a village in Tafresh County

=== Mazandaran province ===
- Mohammadabad, Amol, a village in Amol County
- Mohammadabad, Dasht-e Sar, a village in Amol County
- Mohammadabad, Behshahr, a village in Behshahr County
- Mohammadabad, Chalus, a village in Chalus County
- Mohammadabad, Miandorud-e Bozorg, a village in Miandorud County
- Mohammadabad, Tonekabon, a neighborhood in the city of Shirud, Tonekabon County

=== North Khorasan province ===
- Mohammadabad, Bojnord, a village in Bojnord County
- Mohammadabad, Faruj, a village in Faruj County
- Mohammadabad-e Tabar, Jajrom County
- Mohammadabad, Maneh, a village in Maneh County
- Mohammadabad-e Avaz, alternate name of Mohammad Avaz, a village in Maneh County
- Mohammadabad, Samalqan, alternate name of Kalateh-ye Tashi, a village in Samalqan County
- Mohammadabad, Shirvan, a village in Shirvan County

=== Qazvin province ===
- Mohammadabad, former name of Mandarabad, a village in Buin Zahra County
- Mohammadabad-e Gar Gar, a village in Buin Zahra County
- Mohammadabad-e Khareh, a village in Buin Zahra County
- Mohammadabad, Qazvin, a village in Qazvin County
- Mohammadabad, Tarom-e Sofla, alternate name of Duljak Khan-e Mohammadabad, a village in Qazvin County

=== Qom province ===
- Mohammadabad, Qomrud, a village

=== Razavi Khorasan province ===
==== Bakharz County ====
- Mohammadabad, Bakharz, a village

==== Bardaskan County ====
- Mohammadabad, Bardaskan, a village

==== Chenaran County ====
- Mohammadabad, Chenaran, a village

==== Dargaz County ====
- Mohammadabad, former name of the city of Dargaz

==== Fariman County ====
- Mohammadabad-e Sar Cheshmeh Berashk, a village

==== Golbahar County ====
- Mohammadabad-e Baluch, a village

==== Gonabad County ====
- Mohammadabad-e Lab-e Rud, a village

==== Joghatai County ====
- Mohammadabad-e Gaft, a village

==== Kashmar County ====
- Mohammadabad-e Andaleyb, a village

==== Khalilabad County ====
- Mohammadabad, Khalilabad, a village

==== Khaf County ====
- Mohammadabad, Nashtifan, a village
- Mohammadabad, Sangan, a village

==== Mashhad County ====
- Mohammadabad, Mashhad, a village
- Mohammadabad-e Ilkhani, a village

==== Nishapur County ====
- Mohammadabad, Nishapur, a village
- Mohammadabad-e Do Khaneh, a village

==== Quchan County ====
- Mohammadabad-e Olya, Razavi Khorasan, a village
- Mohammadabad-e Sharqi, a village
- Mohammadabad-e Sofla, Razavi Khorasan, a village

==== Roshtkhar County ====
- Mohammadabad, Roshtkhar, a village

==== Sabzevar County ====
- Mohammadabad, Khavashod, a village
- Mohammadabad, Kuh Hamayi, a village

==== Torbat-e Jam County ====
- Mohammadabad, Mian Jam, alternate name of Mahmudabad-e Olya, Razavi Khorasan, a village
- Mohammadabad, Nasrabad, alternate name of Qazqaveh, a village
- Mohammadabad, Torbat-e Jam, a village in Zam Rural District

==== Zaveh County ====
- Mohammadabad, Zaveh, a village

==== Zeberkhan County ====
- Mohammadabad, Zeberkhan, a village

=== Semnan province ===
- Mohammadabad, Damghan, a village in Damghan County
- Mohammadabad, Garmsar, a village in Garmsar County
- Mohammadabad, Meyami, a village in Meyami County
- Mohammadabad Pol-e Abrisham, a village in Meyami County

=== Sistan and Baluchestan province ===
- Mohammadabad, Bampur, alternate name of Mohammadan, Bampur, a village in Bampur County
- Mohammadabad, Hamun, a city in Hamun County
- Mohammadabad Rural District (Hamun County), an administrative division
- Mohammadabad-e Padgan, a village in Khash County
- Mohammadabad-e Pain, Sistan and Baluchestan, a village in Mirjaveh County
- Mohammadabad-e Suran, a village in Mirjaveh County
- Mohammadabad, Eskelabad, a village in Taftan County
- Mohammadabad, Taftan, a village in Taftan County
- Mohammadabad-e Pain Talarak, a village in Taftan County
- Mohammadabad-e Shah Nur, a village in Taftan County

=== South Khorasan province ===
==== Boshruyeh County ====
- Mohammadabad, Korond, a village

==== Darmian County ====
- Mohammadabad, Darmian, a village
- Mohammadabad-e Olya, South Khorasan, a village
- Mohammadabad-e Sofla, South Khorasan, a village

==== Khusf County ====
- Mohammadabad, Khusf, alternate name of Taqab, South Khorasan, a village
- Mohammadabad, Qaleh Zari, a village

==== Nehbandan County ====
- Mohammadabad (1), Bandan, a village
- Mohammadabad (2), Bandan, a village
- Mohammadabad, Neh, a village
- Mohammadabad-e Razzaqzadeh, a village

==== Qaen County ====
- Mohammadabad-e Alam, a village
- Mohammadabad-e Chahak, a village

==== Sarbisheh County ====
- Mohammadabad-e Kharkash, a village

==== Tabas County ====
- Mohammadabad, Dastgerdan, a village
- Mohammadabad, Montazeriyeh, a village
- Mohammadabad-e Chah Kavir, a village

==== Zirkuh County ====
- Mohammadabad, Zirkuh, a village

=== Tehran province ===
- Mohammadabad, alternate name of Mahmudabad, Malard, a village in Malard County
- Mohammadabad, Malard, a village in Malard County
- Mohammadabad-e Ayala, a village in Qarchak County
- Mohammadabad, Ray, a village in Ray County
- Mohammadabad-e Amin, a neighborhood in the city of Ray, Ray County
- Mohammadabad-e Peyghambar, alternate name of Peyghambar, a village in Robat Karim County
- Mohammadabad-e Arab, a village in Varamin County

=== West Azerbaijan province ===
- Mohammadabad, Chaldoran, alternate name of Mohammad Aqa-ye Olya, a village in Chaldoran County
- Mohammadabad, Maku, a village in Maku County
- Mohammadabad, Shahin Dezh, a village in Shahin Dezh County

=== Yazd province ===
==== Bafq County ====
- Mohammadabad-e Gowd Ginestan, a village

==== Mehriz County ====
- Mohammadabad-e Alizadeh, a village

==== Meybod County ====
- Mohammadabad, Meybod, a village

==== Taft County ====
- Mohammadabad, Garizat, a village
- Mohammadabad, Nasrabad, a village
- Mohammadabad-e Nilchi, a village
- Mohammadabad-e Saidabad, a village

==== Yazd County ====
- Mohammadabad, Yazd, a village
- Mohammadabad Rural District (Zarach County), an administrative division

==== Zarach County ====
- Mohammadabad, Zarach, a village

=== Zanjan province ===
- Mohammadabad, Bizineh Rud, a village in Khodabandeh County
- Mohammadabad, Sojas Rud, a village in Khodabandeh County
- Mohammadabad, Tarom, alternate name of Mohammadabad-e Khvajeh Beyglu, a village in Tarom County

== Pakistan ==
- Mohammadabad, Sindh

== See also ==
- Mohammad Aliabad (disambiguation)
- Mohammadpur (disambiguation)
- Mahmudabad (disambiguation)
- Mohammadabad Rural District (disambiguation)
