= Mahmudabad =

Mahmudabad or Mahmoodabad or Mahmood Abad may refer to:

== Bangladesh ==
- Mahmudabad, a historical mint town and subdivision of the Bengal Subah. It comprises the modern-day Northeastern Jessore and Western Faridpur as well as Northeastern Nadia in India.

== India ==
- Mahmudabad, India, Uttar Pradesh, Sitapur district near Lucknow, Uttar Pradesh
- Mahemdavad, Gujarat

== Iran ==
=== Alborz Province ===
- Mahmudabad, Alborz, a village in Alborz Province

=== Ardabil Province ===
- Mahmudabad, Ardabil, a village in Ardabil County
- Mahmudabad, Khalkhal, a village in Khalkhal County
- Mahmudabad, Meshgin Shahr, a village in Meshgin Shahr County
- Mahmudabad, Namin, a village in Namin County
- Mahmudabad-e Taleqani, a village in Parsabad County
- Mahmudabad Rural District (Parsabad County)

=== Chaharmahal and Bakhtiari Province ===
- Mahmudabad, Chaharmahal and Bakhtiari, a village in Kuhrang County

=== East Azerbaijan Province ===
- Mahmudabad, Ajab Shir, a village in Ajab Shir County
- Mahmudabad, Kaleybar, a village in Kaleybar County
- Mahmudabad, Khoda Afarin, a village in Khoda Afarin County
- Mahmudabad, Shabestan, a village in Shabestan County

=== Fars Province ===
- Mahmudabad, Bavanat, a village in Bavanat County
- Mahmudabad-e Olya, Fasa, a village in Fasa County
- Mahmudabad-e Sofla, Fars, a village in Fasa County
- Mahmudabad, Jahrom, a village in Jahrom County
- Mahmudabad-e Do Dang, a village in Kavar County
- Mahmudabad-e Seh Dang, a village in Kavar County
- Mahmudabad-e Yek Dang, a village in Kavar County
- Mahmudabad-e Danicheh Kheyr, a village in Khorrambid County
- Mahmudabad, Marvdasht, a village in Marvdasht County
- Mahmudabad, Neyriz, a village in Neyriz County
- Mahmudabad, Poshtkuh, a village in Neyriz County
- Mahmudabad, Qatruyeh, a village in Neyriz County
- Mahmudabad, Sarvestan, a village in Sarvestan County
- Mahmudabad, Bid Zard, a village in Shiraz County
- Mahmudabad, Qarah Bagh, a village in Shiraz County
- Mahmudabad, Siyakh Darengun, a village in Shiraz County
- Mahmudabad, Zarqan, a village in Shiraz County

=== Gilan Province ===
- Mahmudabad, Gilan, a village in Talesh County

=== Golestan Province ===
- Mahmudabad, Golestan, a village in Galikash County

=== Hamadan Province ===
- Mahmudabad, Kabudarahang, a village in Kabudarahang County
- Mahmudabad, Malayer, a village in Malayer County
- Mahmudabad, Samen, a village in Malayer County
- Mahmudabad, Nahavand, a village in Nahavand County
- Mahmudabad, Khezel, a village in Nahavand County
- Mahmudabad, Tuyserkan, a village in Tuyserkan County

=== Ilam Province ===
- Mahmudabad, Ilam, a village in Ilam County

=== Isfahan Province ===
- Mahmudabad, Chadegan, a village in Chadegan County
- Mahmudabad, Dehaqan, a village in Dehaqan County
- Mahmudabad, Isfahan, a village in Isfahan County
- Mahmudabad, Lay Siyah, a village in Nain County
- Mahmudabad Rural District (Isfahan Province), in Isfahan County

=== Kerman Province ===
- Mahmudabad-e Borumand, a village in Anbarabad County
- Mahmudabad Mazaheri, a village in Anbarabad County
- Mahmudabad, Arzuiyeh, a village in Baft County
- Mahmudabad, Howmeh, a village in Bam County
- Mahmudabad, Bardsir, a village in Bardsir County
- Mahmudabad-e Yek, Kuh Panj, a village in Bardsir County
- Mahmudabad-e Yek, Negar, a village in Bardsir County
- Mahmudabad, Kahnuj, a village in Kahnuj County
- Mahmudabad, Rayen, a village in Kerman County
- Mahmudabad, Rafsanjan, a village in Rafsanjan County
- Mahmudabad, Rudbar-e Jonubi, a village in Rudbar-e Jonubi County
- Mahmudabad, Shahr-e Babak, a village in Shahr-e Babak County
- Mahmudabad, Pa Qaleh, a village in Shahr-e Babak County
- Mahmudabad-e Shakur, a village in Shahr-e Babak County
- Mahmudabad-e Darvish, a village in Sirjan County
- Mahmudabad-e Hoseyn Safar, a village in Sirjan County
- Mahmudabad-e Seyyed, a village in Sirjan County
- Mahmudabad-e Seyyed Rural District, in Sirjan County

=== Kermanshah Province ===
- Mahmudabad, Harsin, a village in Harsin County
- Mahmudabad, Javanrud, a village in Javanrud County
- Mahmudabad, Kermanshah, a village in Kermanshah County
- Mahmudabad, Sahneh, a village in Sahneh County
- Mahmudabad-e Gavkol, a village in Sahneh County
- Mahmudabad-e Zardab, a village in Sahneh County

=== Khuzestan Province ===
- Mahmudabad-e Gomar, a village in Andika County
- Mahmudabad, Behbahan, a village in Behbahan County
- Mahmudabad, Lali, a village in Lali County

=== Kurdistan Province ===
- Mahmudabad, Divandarreh, a village in Divandarreh County
- Mahmudabad, Kamyaran, a village in Divandarreh County
- Mahmudabad, Saqqez, a village in Saqqez County
- Mahmudabad, Sarvabad, a village in Sarvabad County

=== Lorestan Province ===
- Mahmudabad, Lorestan, a village in Lorestan Province
- Mahmudabad Shahab, a village in Lorestan Province

=== Markazi Province ===
- Mahmudabad, Salehan, a village in Khomeyn County
- Mahmudabad, Komijan, a village in Komijan County
- Mahmudabad, Saveh, a village in Saveh County
- Mahmudabad, Shazand, a village in Shazand County

=== Mazandaran Province ===
- Mahmudabad, Mazandaran, a city in Mazandaran Province
- Mahmudabad, Babol, a village in Babol County

=== Qazvin Province ===
- Mahmudabad, Abyek, a village in Abyek County
- Mahmudabad, Avaj, a village in Buin Zahra County
- Mahmudabad, Qazvin, a village in Qazvin County
- Mahmudabad, Shal, a village in Buin Zahra County
- Mahmudabad, Takestan, a village in Takestan County
- Mahmudabad-e Alam Khani, a village in Qazvin County
- Mahmudabad-e Nemuneh, a city in Qazvin Province

=== Qom Province ===
- Mahmudabad, Qom

=== Razavi Khorasan Province ===
- Mahmudabad, Nishapur, a village in Nishapur County
- Mahmudabad-e Fazl, a village in Nishapur County
- Mahmudabad, Torbat-e Heydarieh, a village in Torbat-e Heydarieh County
- Mahmudabad, Jolgeh Rokh, a village in Torbat-e Heydarieh County
- Mahmudabad-e Olya, Razavi Khorasan, a village in Torbat-e Jam County

=== Semnan Province ===
- Mahmudabad-e Mowquf, a village in Garmsar County
- Mahmudabad, Semnan, a village in Semnan County

=== Sistan and Baluchestan Province ===
- Mahmudabad-e Garvas Bakam, a village in Dalgan County
- Mahmudabad, Irandegan, a village in Khash County

=== South Khorasan Province ===
- Mahmudabad, Birjand, a village in Birjand County
- Mahmudabad, Darmian, a village in Darmian County
- Mahmudabad, Khusf, a village in Khusf County
- Mahmudabad, Qaen, a village in Qaen County

=== Tehran Province ===
- Mahmudabad, Firuzkuh, a village in Firuzkuh County
- Mahmudabad, Malard, a village in Malard County
- Mahmudabad, Qaleh Now, a village in Rey County
- Mahmudabad-e Khalajabad, a village in Shahriar County
- Mahmudabad-e Khalaseh, a village in Pakdasht County
- Mahmudabad-e Kohneh, a village in Pishva County
- Mahmudabad-e Now, a village in Pishva County
- Mahmudabad-e Shotor Khvar, a village in Pishva County
- Mahmudabad-e Tabat Bayi, a village in Qarchak County

=== West Azerbaijan Province ===
- Mahmudabad, West Azerbaijan, a city
- Mahmudabad, Bukan, a village in Bukan County
- Mahmudabad (36°28′ N 45°35′ E), Mahabad, a village in Mahabad County
- Mahmudabad-e Olya, West Azerbaijan, a village in Shahin Dezh County
- Mahmudabad-e Sofla, West Azerbaijan, a village in Shahin Dezh County
- Mahmudabad, Urmia, a village in Urmia County
- Mahmudabad Rural District (Shahin Dezh County)

=== Yazd Province ===
==== Bafq County ====
- Mahmudabad, alternate name of Basab, a village in Bafq County

==== Khatam County ====
- Mahmudabad, Khatam, a village in Khatam County

==== Mehriz County ====
- Mahmudabad, Khvormiz, a village in Mehriz County

==== Taft County ====
- Mahmudabad, Sakhvid, a village in Taft County
- Mahmudabad-e Nasri, a village in Taft County
- Mahmudabad, Yazd, a village in Yazd County

=== Zanjan Province ===
- Mahmudabad, Khodabandeh, a village in Khodabandeh County
- Mahmudabad, Zanjan, a village in Zanjan County

== Pakistan ==
- Mahmudabad, Karachi, a neighbourhood in Karachi, Sindh

== See also ==
- Mahmudabad-e Olya (disambiguation)
