= Mohammadabad-e Pain =

Mohammadabad-e Pain or Mohammadabad Pain (Persian: محمّد آباد پائین) may refer to:

- Mohammadabad-e Pain, Fars
- Mohammadabad-e Pain, Golestan
- Mohammadabad-e Pain, alternate name of Mohammadabad-e Sofla, Kerman, Kerman Province
- Mohammadabad-e Pain, alternate name of Mohammadabad-e Anbari, Kerman Province
- Mohammadabad-e Pain, Sistan and Baluchestan
- Mohammadabad-e Pain, South Khorasan
