= Mohammadpur =

Mohammadpur or Muhammadpur (lit. 'city of Muhammad') may refer to:

== Bangladesh ==
- Mohammadpur Thana, Dhaka District, Bangladesh
  - Mohammadpur Central University College, Dhaka, Bangladesh
  - Mohammadpur Government High School, Dhaka, Bangladesh
  - Mohammadpur Preparatory and Higher Secondary School, Dhaka, Bangladesh
- Mohammedpur, Dolarbazar, a village in Dolarbazar Union, Sunamganj District, Bangladesh
- Mohammadpur Upazila, an upazila of Magura District, Khulna, Bangladesh

== India ==
- Mohammadpur, Bihar, a town in Bihar, India
- Mohammadpur, Firozabad, a village in Uttar Pradesh, India
- Muhammadpur Ghiror, a village in Uttar Pradesh, India
- Muhammadpur Nagariya, a village in Uttar Pradesh, India
- Muhammadpur T Chaudhari Azmal, a village in Uttar Pradesh, India
- Mohammadpur Umri, a village in Uttar Pradesh, India
- Mohanpur Mohammadpur, a town in Hardwar district, Uttarakhand, India
- Mahammadpur, a village in Bihar, India

== Pakistan ==
- Muhammadpur Diwan, a town in Rajanpur District in Punjab, Pakistan

== See also ==
- Mohammadabad (disambiguation)
