= Mohammadabad-e Sofla =

Mohammadabad-e Sofla (Persian: محمدابادسفلي) may refer to:

- Mohammadabad-e Sofla, Fars
- Mohammadabad-e Sofla, Kerman
- Mohammadabad-e Sofla, Razavi Khorasan
- Mohammadabad-e Sofla, South Khorasan
