= Mohammad Aliabad =

Mohammad Aliabad (Persian: محمد علي آباد) may refer to:

- Mohammad Aliabad, Golestan
- Mohammad Aliabad, Khuzestan
- Mohammad Aliabad, Kurdistan
- Mohammad Aliabad, Lorestan
