= Mahmudabad-e Olya =

Mahmudabad-e Olya (Persian: محمودابادعليا) may refer to:

- Mahmudabad-e Olya, Fasa, Fars Province
- Mahmudabad-e Olya, Marvdasht, Fars Province
- Mahmudabad-e Olya, Kohgiluyeh and Boyer-Ahmad
- Mahmudabad-e Olya, Razavi Khorasan
- Mahmudabad-e Olya, West Azerbaijan
