= Mahmudabad-e Bala =

Mahmudabad-e Bala (Persian: محمودابادبالا) may refer to:

- Mahmudabad-e Bala, Kohgiluyeh and Boyer-Ahmad
- Mahmudabad-e Bala, Razavi Khorasan
