= Rostam Rud =

City in Mazandaran province, Iran

Rostam Rud Persian: رستم رود
- City
- Location within Iran
- Coordinates: 36°35′22″N 52°05′27″E
- Country: Iran
- Province: Mazandaran
- County: Nur
- District: Central
- Area District: Natel Kenar-e Sofla

Population (2016)
  - Total: 2,673
- Time zone: UTC+3:30 (IRST)

Rostam Rud (Persian: رستم رود) (Note: Also romanized as Rostam Rūd) is a city in Natel Kenar-e Sofla Area District of the Central District in Nur County, Mazandaran province, Iran. It is a suburban city between the cities of Nur and Mahmudabad.

== Demographics ==
=== Population ===
At the time of the 2006 National Census, the city's population was 2,556 in 713 households. The following census in 2011 counted 2,764 people in 857 households. The 2016 census measured the population of the city as 2,673 people in 867 households, the most populous in its r Nurcity district.
