= Mahmudabad-e Sofla =

Mahmudabad-e Sofla (Persian: محمودابادسفلي) may refer to:

- Mahmudabad-e Sofla, Fars
- Mahmudabad-e Sofla, Razavi Khorasan
- Mahmudabad-e Sofla, West Azerbaijan
