= Mahmudabad-e Yek =

Mahmudabad-e Yek (Persian: محمود آباد1) may refer to:

- Mahmudabad-e Yek, Kuh Panj
- Mahmudabad-e Yek, Negar
