= Mohammadabad-e Olya =

Mohammadabad-e Olya (Persian: محمدابادعليا) may refer to:

- Mohammadabad-e Olya, Kerman
- Mohammadabad-e Olya, Razavi Khorasan
- Mohammadabad-e Olya, South Khorasan
