= Deh-e Iraj =

Deh-e Iraj ده ايرج
- Village
- Location within Iran
- Coordinates: 30°47′08″N 56°26′41″E
- Country: Iran
- Province: Kerman
- County: Zarand
- Bakhsh: Central
- Rural District: Mohammadabad

Population (2006)
  - Total: 770
- Time zone: UTC+3:30 (IRST)
  - Summer (DST): UTC+4:30 (IRDT)

Deh-e Iraj (Persian: ده ايرج, also Romanized as Deh-e Īraj and Deh Īraj) is a village in Mohammadabad Rural District, in the Central District of Zarand County, Kerman Province, Iran. At the 2006 census, its population was 770, in 194 families.
