= Shah Jahanabad =

Village in Kerman province, Iran

Shah Jahanabad Persian: شاه جهان اباد
- Village
- Location within Iran
- Coordinates: 30°48′26″N 56°31′16″E
- Country: Iran
- Province: Kerman
- County: Zarand
- District: Central
- Rural District: Mohammadabad

Population (2016)
  - Total: 5,708
- Time zone: UTC+3:30 (IRST)

Shah Jahanabad (Persian: شاه جهان اباد) (Note: Also romanized as Shāh Jahānābād; also known as Hashtābād, Rūḥābād (روح اباد), and Shā Jahān) is a village in Mohammadabad Rural District of the Central District of Zarand County, Kerman province, Iran.

== Demographics ==
=== Population ===
At the time of the 2006 National Census, the village's population was 3,360 in 804 households. The following census in 2011 counted 4,806 people in 1,312 households. The 2016 census measured the population of the village as 5,708 people in 1,566 households. It was the most populous village in its rural district.
