= Mohammadabad Rural District =

Mohammadabad Rural District (Persian: دهستان محمدآباد) may refer to several administrative divisions of Iran:

- Mohammadabad Rural District (Karaj County), Alborz province
- Mohammadabad Rural District (Marvdasht County), Fars province
- Mohammadabad Rural District (Anbarabad County), Kerman province
- Mohammadabad Rural District (Zarand County), Kerman province
- Mohammadabad Rural District (Hamun County), Sistan and Baluchestan province
- Mohammadabad Rural District (Zarach County), Yazd province
