= Mohammadabad, Jiroft =

Village in Kerman province, Iran

Mohammadabad Persian: محمداباد
- Village
- Location within Iran
- Coordinates: 28°13′25″N 57°28′21″E
- Country: Iran
- Province: Kerman
- County: Jiroft
- District: Esmaili
- Rural District: Esmaili

Population (2016)
  - Total: Below reporting threshold
- Time zone: UTC+3:30 (IRST)

Mohammadabad (Persian: محمداباد) (Note: Also romanized as Moḩammadābād) is a village in Esmaili Rural District of Esmaili District, Jiroft County, Kerman province, Iran.

== Demographics ==
=== Population ===
At the time of the 2006 National Census, the village's population was 126 in 23 households, when it was in Anbarabad County. The following census in 2011 counted 33 people in nine households, by which time the district had been separated from the county to join Jiroft County. The 2016 census measured the population of the village as below the reporting threshold.
