= Mohammadabad-e Kahuri =

Mohammadabad-e Kahuri محمدابادكهوري
- Village
- Location within Iran
- Coordinates: 27°57′21″N 56°39′08″E
- Country: Iran
- Province: Hormozgan
- County: Hajjiabad
- Bakhsh: Ahmadi
- Rural District: Ahmadi

Population (2006)
  - Total: 74
- Time zone: UTC+3:30 (IRST)
  - Summer (DST): UTC+4:30 (IRDT)

Mohammadabad-e Kahuri (Persian: محمدابادكهوري, also Romanized as Moḩammadābād-e Kahūrī) is a village in Ahmadi Rural District, Ahmadi District, Hajjiabad County, Hormozgan Province, Iran. At the 2006 census, its population was 74, in 17 families.
