= Mohammadabad, Mashhad =

Mohammadabad محمداباد
- Village
- Location within Iran
- Coordinates: 36°31′06″N 59°21′06″E
- Country: Iran
- Province: Razavi Khorasan
- County: Mashhad
- Bakhsh: Central
- Rural District: Miyan Velayat

Population (2006)
  - Total: 63
- Time zone: UTC+3:30 (IRST)
  - Summer (DST): UTC+4:30 (IRDT)

Mohammadabad (Persian: محمداباد, also Romanized as Moḩammadābād) is a village in Miyan Velayat Rural District, in the Central District of Mashhad County, Razavi Khorasan Province, Iran. At the 2006 census, its population was 63, in 16 families.

== Climate ==
Climate data for Mashhad
Month	Jan	Feb	Mar	Apr	May	Jun	Jul	Aug	Sep	Oct	Nov	Dec	Year
Mean daily maximum °C (°F)	4 (39)	6 (43)	13 (56)	20 (68)	26 (78)	32 (89)	34 (93)	32 (89)	28 (83)	21 (70)	14 (58)	8 (46)	21 (69)
Mean daily minimum °C (°F)	−6 (22)	−3 (27)	3 (38)	10 (50)	14 (57)	18 (65)	20 (68)	18 (64)	13 (56)	8 (46)	2 (36)	−1 (30)	9 (48)
Average precipitation mm (inches)	28 (1.1)	33 (1.3)	56 (2.2)	46 (1.8)	28 (1.1)	5.1 (0.2)	0 (0)	0 (0)	0 (0)	10 (0.4)	15 (0.6)	18 (0.7)	240 (9.5)
Source: Weatherbase
