= Mohammadabad-e Ab Shirin =

Mohammadabad-e Ab Shirin محمداباداب شيرين
- Village
- Location within Iran
- Coordinates: 28°55′21″N 58°41′54″E
- Country: Iran
- Province: Kerman
- County: Narmashir
- Bakhsh: Central
- Rural District: Azizabad

Population (2006)
  - Total: 1,101
- Time zone: UTC+3:30 (IRST)
  - Summer (DST): UTC+4:30 (IRDT)

Mohammadabad-e Ab Shirin (Persian: محمداباداب شيرين, also Romanized as Moḩammadābād-e Āb Shīrīn, Moḩammadābād Āb-e Shirin, Mohammad Abad Ab Shirin, and Moḩammadābād-e Āb-e Shirin; also known as Moḩammadābād) is a village in Azizabad Rural District, in the Central District of Narmashir County, Kerman Province, Iran. At the 2006 census, its population was 1,101, in 212 families.
