= Mohammad Aliabad, Lorestan =

Mohammad Aliabad محمدعلي اباد
- Village
- Location within Iran
- Coordinates: 33°51′59″N 48°11′28″E
- Country: Iran
- Province: Lorestan
- County: Selseleh
- Bakhsh: Central
- Rural District: Yusefvand

Population (2006)
  - Total: 220
- Time zone: UTC+3:30 (IRST)
  - Summer (DST): UTC+4:30 (IRDT)

Mohammad Aliabad (Persian: محمدعلي اباد, also Romanized as Moḩammad ‘Alīābād) is a village in Yusefvand Rural District, in the Central District of Selseleh County, Lorestan Province, Iran. At the 2006 census, its population was 220, in 47 families.
