= Mohammadabad, Shaab Jereh =

Village in Kerman province, Iran

Mohammadabad Persian: محمداباد
- Village
- Location within Iran
- Coordinates: 31°04′10″N 56°14′00″E
- Country: Iran
- Province: Kerman
- County: Zarand
- District: Yazdanabad
- Rural District: Shaab Jereh

Population (2016)
  - Total: 417
- Time zone: UTC+3:30 (IRST)

Mohammadabad (Persian: محمداباد) (Note: Also romanized as Moḩammadābād)) is a village in Shaab Jereh Rural District of Yazdanabad District, Zarand County, Kerman province, Iran.

== Demographics ==
=== Population ===
At the time of the 2006 National Census, the village's population was 417 in 115 households, when it was in Toghrol ol Jerd District of Kuhbanan County. The village did not appear in the following census of 2011, by which time the rural district had been separated from the county to join Yazdanabad District of Zarand County. The 2016 census measured the population of the village as 417 people in 128 households.
