= Partaleh =

Partaleh پرتاله
- Village
- Location within Iran
- Coordinates: 34°50′04″N 47°03′12″E
- Country: Iran
- Province: Kurdistan
- County: Kamyaran
- Bakhsh: Central
- Rural District: Bilavar

Population (2006)
  - Total: 115
- Time zone: UTC+3:30 (IRST)
  - Summer (DST): UTC+4:30 (IRDT)

Partaleh (Persian: پرتاله, also Romanized as Partāleh; also known as Moḩammadābād) is a village in Bilavar Rural District, in the Central District of Kamyaran County, Kurdistan Province, Iran. At the 2006 census, its population was 115, in 20 families. The village is populated by Kurds.
