= Mohammadabad, Zarand =

Village in Kerman province, Iran

Mohammadabad Persian: محمداباد
- Village
- Location within Iran
- Coordinates: 30°47′23″N 56°31′29″E
- Country: Iran
- Province: Kerman
- County: Zarand
- District: Central
- Rural District: Mohammadabad

Population (2016)
  - Total: 2,039
- Time zone: UTC+3:30 (IRST)

Mohammadabad (Persian: محمداباد) (Note: Also romanized as Moḩammadābād; also known as Mohammad Abad Hoomeh and Moḩammadābād Ḩūmeh) is a village in, and the capital of, Mohammadabad Rural District of the Central District of Zarand County, Kerman province, Iran.

== Demographics ==
=== Population ===
At the time of the 2006 National Census, the village's population was 1,728 in 448 households. The following census in 2011 counted 2,005 people in 579 households. The 2016 census measured the population of the village as 2,039 people in 606 households.
