= Mohammadabad-e Salehan =

Village in Kohgiluyeh and Boyer-Ahmad province, Iran

Mohammadabad-e Salehan Persian: محمدابادصالحان
- Village
- Location within Iran
- Coordinates: 30°46′24″N 51°19′28″E
- Country: Iran
- Province: Kohgiluyeh and Boyer-Ahmad
- County: Boyer-Ahmad
- District: Kabgian
- Rural District: Kabgian

Population (2016)
  - Total: 50
- Time zone: UTC+3:30 (IRST)

Mohammadabad-e Salehan (Persian: محمدابادصالحان) (Note: Also romanized as Moḩammadābād-e Şāleḩān; also known as Deh-e Vaqmī and Moḩammadābād) is a village in Kabgian Rural District of Kabgian District, Boyer-Ahmad County, Kohgiluyeh and Boyer-Ahmad province, Iran.

== Demographics ==
=== Population ===
At the time of the 2006 National Census, the village's population was 42 in seven households, when it was in Dana County. The following census in 2011 counted 32 people in six households. The 2016 census measured the population of the village as 60 people in 17 households, by which time the district had been separated from the county to join Boyer-Ahmad County.
