= Mohammadabad, Bandar Abbas =

Mohammadabad محمد آباد
- Village
- Location within Iran
- Coordinates: 27°19′06″N 56°07′20″E
- Country: Iran
- Province: Hormozgan
- County: Bandar Abbas
- Bakhsh: Central
- Rural District: Tazian

Population (2006)
  - Total: 822
- Time zone: UTC+3:30 (IRST)
  - Summer (DST): UTC+4:30 (IRDT)

Mohammadabad (Persian: محمد آباد, also Romanized as Moḩammadābād) is a village in Tazian Rural District, in the Central District of Bandar Abbas County, Hormozgan Province, Iran. At the 2006 census, its population was 822, in 172 families.
