= Mohammadabad-e Asghar Khan =

Mohammadabad-e Asghar Khan محمداباداصغرخان
- Village
- Location within Iran
- Coordinates: 28°40′14″N 59°04′21″E
- Country: Iran
- Province: Kerman
- County: Rigan
- Bakhsh: Central
- Rural District: Rigan

Population (2006)
  - Total: 671
- Time zone: UTC+3:30 (IRST)
  - Summer (DST): UTC+4:30 (IRDT)

Mohammadabad-e Asghar Khan (Persian: محمداباداصغرخان, also Romanized as Moḩammadābād-e Aṣghar Khān; also known as Moḩammadābād-e Karīmkhān) is a village in Rigan Rural District, in the Central District of Rigan County, Kerman Province, Iran. At the 2006 census, its population was 671, in 125 families.
