= Aseman Darreh =

Aseman Darreh آسمان دره
- Village
- Location within Iran
- Coordinates: 35°01′58″N 47°13′20″E
- Country: Iran
- Province: Kurdistan
- County: Kamyaran
- Bakhsh: Muchesh
- Rural District: Amirabad

Population (2006)
  - Total: 172
- Time zone: UTC+3:30 (IRST)
  - Summer (DST): UTC+4:30 (IRDT)

Aseman Darreh (Persian: آسمان دره, also Romanized as Āsemān Darreh, Āsmān Darreh, Āsemāndarreh; also known as Maḩmūdābād and ‘Os̄mān Darreh) is a village in Amirabad Rural District, Muchesh District, Kamyaran County, Kurdistan Province, Iran. At the 2006 census, its population was 172, in 38 families. The village is populated by Kurds.
