= Mohammadabad, Khondab =

Mohammadabad محمداباد
- Village
- Location within Iran
- Coordinates: 34°19′42″N 49°02′14″E
- Country: Iran
- Province: Markazi
- County: Khondab
- Bakhsh: Central
- Rural District: Khondab

Population (2006)
  - Total: 101
- Time zone: UTC+3:30 (IRST)
  - Summer (DST): UTC+4:30 (IRDT)

Mohammadabad (Persian: محمداباد, also Romanized as Moḩammadābād and Muhammadābād) is a village in Khondab Rural District, in the Central District of Khondab County, Markazi Province, Iran. At the 2006 census, its population was 101, in 23 families.
