= Mohammadabad-e Lab-e Rud =

Mohammadabad-e Lab-e Rud محمداباد لب رود
- Village
- Location within Iran
- Coordinates: 34°11′24″N 58°32′51″E
- Country: Iran
- Province: Razavi Khorasan
- County: Gonabad
- Bakhsh: Kakhk
- Rural District: Zibad

Population (2006)
  - Total: 51
- Time zone: UTC+3:30 (IRST)
  - Summer (DST): UTC+4:30 (IRDT)

Mohammadabad-e Lab-e Rud (Persian: محمداباد لب رود, also Romanized as Moḩammadābād-e Lab-e Rūd; also known as Moḩammadābād) is a village in Zibad Rural District, Kakhk District, Gonabad County, Razavi Khorasan Province, Iran. At the 2006 census, its population was 51, in 17 families.
