= Mohammadabad-e Ashur Pashur =

Mohammadabad-e Ashur Pashur محمداباداشورپاشور
- Village
- Location within Iran
- Coordinates: 30°37′46″N 51°33′40″E
- Country: Iran
- Province: Kohgiluyeh and Boyer-Ahmad
- County: Boyer-Ahmad
- Bakhsh: Central
- Rural District: Sarrud-e Jonubi

Population (2006)
  - Total: 121
- Time zone: UTC+3:30 (IRST)
  - Summer (DST): UTC+4:30 (IRDT)

Mohammadabad-e Ashur Pashur (Persian: محمداباداشورپاشور, also Romanized as Moḩammadābād-e Āshūr Pāshūr; also known as Āshūr Pāshūr and Moḩammadābād) is a village in Sarrud-e Jonubi Rural District, in the Central District of Boyer-Ahmad County, Kohgiluyeh and Boyer-Ahmad Province, Iran. At the 2006 census, its population was 121, in 23 families.
