= Mohammadabad, Korond =

Mohammadabad محمداباد
- Village
- Location within Iran
- Coordinates: 33°56′18″N 57°12′50″E
- Country: Iran
- Province: South Khorasan
- County: Boshruyeh
- Bakhsh: Central
- Rural District: Korond

Population (2006)
  - Total: 26
- Time zone: UTC+3:30 (IRST)
  - Summer (DST): UTC+4:30 (IRDT)

Mohammadabad (Persian: محمداباد, also Romanized as Moḩammadābād) is a village in Korond Rural District, in the Central District of Boshruyeh County, South Khorasan Province, Iran. At the 2006 census, its population was 26, in 7 families.
