= Mahmudabad-e Garvas Bakam =

Mahmudabad-e Garvas Bakam محمود ابادگروس باكم
- Village
- Country: Iran
- Province: Sistan and Baluchestan
- County: Dalgan
- Bakhsh: Central
- Rural District: Hudian

Population (2006)
  - Total: 121
- Time zone: UTC+3:30 (IRST)
  - Summer (DST): UTC+4:30 (IRDT)

Mahmudabad-e Garvas Bakam (Persian: محمود ابادگروس باكم, also Romanized as Maḩmūdābād-e Garvas Bākam) is a village in Hudian Rural District, in the Central District of Dalgan County, Sistan and Baluchestan Province, Iran. At the 2006 census, its population was 121, in 23 families.
