= Mohammadabad, Kangavar =

Mohammadabad محمداباد
- Village
- Location within Iran
- Coordinates: 34°30′00″N 47°54′00″E
- Country: Iran
- Province: Kermanshah
- County: Kangavar
- Bakhsh: Central
- Rural District: Kermajan

Population (2006)
  - Total: 212
- Time zone: UTC+3:30 (IRST)
  - Summer (DST): UTC+4:30 (IRDT)

Mohammadabad (Persian: محمداباد, also Romanized as Moḩammadābād) is a village in Kermajan Rural District, in the Central District of Kangavar County, Kermanshah Province, Iran. At the 2006 census, its population was 212, in 54 families.
