= Mahmudabad-e Gomar =

Mahmudabad-e Gomar محمودابادگمار
- Village
- Country: Iran
- Province: Khuzestan
- County: Andika
- Bakhsh: Abezhdan
- Rural District: Kushk

Population (2006)
  - Total: 83
- Time zone: UTC+3:30 (IRST)
  - Summer (DST): UTC+4:30 (IRDT)

Mahmudabad-e Gomar (Persian: محمودابادگمار, also Romanized as Maḩmūdābād-e Gomār) is a village in Kushk Rural District, Abezhdan District, Andika County, Khuzestan Province, Iran. At the 2006 census, its population was 83, in 15 families.
