= Mohammadabad-e Sheykh =

Mohammadabad-e Sheykh محمدابادشيخ
- Village
- Location within Iran
- Coordinates: 28°57′35″N 58°32′29″E
- Country: Iran
- Province: Kerman
- County: Narmashir
- Bakhsh: Rud Ab
- Rural District: Rud Ab-e Sharqi

Population (2006)
  - Total: 1,012
- Time zone: UTC+3:30 (IRST)
  - Summer (DST): UTC+4:30 (IRDT)

Mohammadabad-e Sheykh (Persian: محمدابادشيخ, also Romanized as Moḩammadābād-e Sheykh and Mohammad Abad Sheikh; also known as Moḩammadābād and Moḩammadābād-e Sheyj) is a village in Rud Ab-e Sharqi Rural District, Rud Ab District, Narmashir County, Kerman Province, Iran. At the 2006 census, its population was 1,012, in 263 families.
