= Mahmudabad Shahab =

Mahmudabad Shahab محمودابادشهاب
- Village
- Location within Iran
- Coordinates: 33°27′53″N 49°39′58″E
- Country: Iran
- Province: Lorestan
- County: Aligudarz
- Bakhsh: Central
- Rural District: Khomeh

Population (2006)
  - Total: 207
- Time zone: UTC+3:30 (IRST)
  - Summer (DST): UTC+4:30 (IRDT)

Mahmudābād Šahāb (Persian: محمودابادشهاب) is a village in Khomeh Rural District, in the Central District of Aligudarz County, Lorestan Province, Iran. At the 2006 census, its population was 207, in 35 families.
