= Mohammadabad-e Nilchi =

Mohammadabad-e Nilchi محمدابادنيلچي
- Village
- Location within Iran
- Coordinates: 31°37′36″N 53°53′06″E
- Country: Iran
- Province: Yazd
- County: Taft
- Bakhsh: Central
- Rural District: Aliabad

Population (2006)
  - Total: 22
- Time zone: UTC+3:30 (IRST)
  - Summer (DST): UTC+4:30 (IRDT)

Mohammadabad-e Nilchi (Persian: محمدابادنيلچي, romanized: Moḩammadābād-e Nīlchī), also known as Moḩammadābād, is a village in Aliabad Rural District, in the Central District of Taft County, Yazd Province, Iran. In the 2006 census, its population was 22, in 8 families.
