= Mohammadabad-e Yek =

Mohammadabad-e Yek محمد اباد1
- Village
- Location within Iran
- Coordinates: 32°32′07″N 50°08′54″E
- Country: Iran
- Province: Chaharmahal and Bakhtiari
- County: Kuhrang
- Bakhsh: Central
- Rural District: Shurab-e Tangazi

Population (2006)
  - Total: 129
- Time zone: UTC+3:30 (IRST)
  - Summer (DST): UTC+4:30 (IRDT)

Mohammadabad-e Yek (Persian: محمد اباد1, also Romanized as Moḩammadābād-e Yek; also known as Moḩammadābād and Mohammad Abad Shoorab) is a village in Shurab-e Tangazi Rural District, in the Central District of Kuhrang County, Chaharmahal and Bakhtiari Province, Iran. At the 2006 census, its population was 129, in 25 families. The village is populated by Lurs.
