= Mohammadabad, Khomeyn =

Mohammadabad محمداباد
- Village
- Location within Iran
- Coordinates: 33°40′37″N 50°10′17″E
- Country: Iran
- Province: Markazi
- County: Khomeyn
- Bakhsh: Kamareh
- Rural District: Khorram Dasht

Population (2006)
  - Total: 184
- Time zone: UTC+3:30 (IRST)
  - Summer (DST): UTC+4:30 (IRDT)

Mohammadabad (Persian: محمداباد, also romanized as Moḩammadābād) is a village in Khorram Dasht Rural District, Kamareh District, Khomeyn County, Markazi Province, Iran. At the 2006 census, its population was 184, in 46 families.
