= Mahmudabad, Samen =

Mahmudabad محموداباد
- Village
- Location within Iran
- Coordinates: 34°09′36″N 48°42′26″E
- Country: Iran
- Province: Hamadan
- County: Malayer
- Bakhsh: Samen
- Rural District: Samen

Population (2006)
  - Total: 46
- Time zone: UTC+3:30 (IRST)
  - Summer (DST): UTC+4:30 (IRDT)

Mahmudabad (Persian: محموداباد, also Romanized as Maḩmūdābād) is a village in Samen Rural District, Samen District, Malayer County, Hamadan Province, Iran. At the 2006 census, its population was 46, in 13 families.
