= Mohammadabad-e Geluski =

Mohammadabad-e Geluski محمدابادگلوسكي
- Village
- Location within Iran
- Coordinates: 28°57′36″N 58°38′22″E
- Country: Iran
- Province: Kerman
- County: Narmashir
- Bakhsh: Central
- Rural District: Posht Rud

Population (2006)
  - Total: 533
- Time zone: UTC+3:30 (IRST)
  - Summer (DST): UTC+4:30 (IRDT)

Mohammadabad-e Geluski (Persian: محمدابادگلوسكي, also romanized as Moḩammadābād-e Gelūskī; also known as Moḩammadābād, Moḩammadābād-e Kalūkī, and Moḩammadābād-e Kelūskī) is a village in Posht Rud Rural District, in the Central District of Narmashir County, Kerman Province, Iran. At the 2006 census, its population was 533, in 122 families.
