= Rudkhaneh, Kerman =

Rudkhaneh رودخانه
- Village
- Location within Iran
- Coordinates: 30°22′27″N 57°53′03″E
- Country: Iran
- Province: Kerman
- County: Kerman
- Bakhsh: Shahdad
- Rural District: Takab

Population (2006)
  - Total: 359
- Time zone: UTC+3:30 (IRST)
  - Summer (DST): UTC+4:30 (IRDT)

Rudkhaneh (Persian: رودخانه, also Romanized as Rūdkhāneh; also known as Moḩammadābād) is a village in Takab Rural District, Shahdad District, Kerman County, Kerman Province, Iran. At the 2006 census, its population was 359, in 78 families.
