= Mahmudabad-e Zardab =

Mahmudabad-e Zardab محمودابادزرداب
- Village
- Location within Iran
- Coordinates: 34°27′40″N 47°30′59″E
- Country: Iran
- Province: Kermanshah
- County: Sahneh
- Bakhsh: Central
- Rural District: Hojr

Population (2006)
  - Total: 347
- Time zone: UTC+3:30 (IRST)
  - Summer (DST): UTC+4:30 (IRDT)

Mahmudabad-e Zardab (Persian: محمودابادزرداب, also Romanized as Maḩmūdābād-e Zardāb) is a village in Hojr Rural District, in the Central District of Sahneh County, Kermanshah Province, Iran. At the 2006 census, its population was 347, in 76 families.
