= Mohammad Aliabad, Kurdistan =

Mohammad Aliabad محمد علي آباد
- Village
- Location within Iran
- Coordinates: 35°52′52″N 45°54′41″E
- Country: Iran
- Province: Kurdistan
- County: Baneh
- Bakhsh: Nanur
- Rural District: Buin

Population (2006)
  - Total: 82
- Time zone: UTC+3:30 (IRST)
  - Summer (DST): UTC+4:30 (IRDT)

Mohammad Aliabad (Persian: محمد علي آباد, also Romanized as Moḩammad ‘Alīābād) is a village in Buin Rural District, Nanur District, Baneh County, Kurdistan Province, Iran. At the 2006 census, its population was 82, in 14 families. The village is populated by Kurds.
