= Mohammadabad-e Mokhtar-e Yek =

Mohammadabad-e Mokhtar-e Yek محمداباد مختار1
- Village
- Location within Iran
- Coordinates: 30°31′52″N 55°59′16″E
- Country: Iran
- Province: Kerman
- County: Rafsanjan
- Bakhsh: Central
- Rural District: Azadegan

Population (2006)
  - Total: 86
- Time zone: UTC+3:30 (IRST)
  - Summer (DST): UTC+4:30 (IRDT)

Mohammadabad-e Mokhtar-e Yek (Persian: محمداباد مختار1, also Romanized as Moḩammadābād-e Mokhtār-e Yek; also known as Moḩammadābād and Moḩammadābād-e Mokhtār) is a village in Azadegan Rural District, in the Central District of Rafsanjan County, Kerman Province, Iran. At the 2006 census, its population was 86, in 21 families.
