= Mohammadabad-e Gar Gar =

Mohammadabad-e Gar Gar محمدابادگرگر
- Village
- Location within Iran
- Coordinates: 35°50′38″N 49°56′14″E
- Country: Iran
- Province: Qazvin
- County: Buin Zahra
- Bakhsh: Ramand
- Rural District: Ebrahimabad

Population (2006)
  - Total: 80
- Time zone: UTC+3:30 (IRST)
  - Summer (DST): UTC+4:30 (IRDT)

Mohammadabad-e Gar Gar (Persian: محمدابادگرگر, also Romanized as Moḩammadābād-e Gar Gar and Moḩammadābād-e Kar Kar; also known as Moḩammadābād) is a village in Ebrahimabad Rural District, Ramand District, Buin Zahra County, Qazvin Province, Iran. At the 2006 census, its population was 80, in 20 families.
