= Qazqaveh =

Qazqaveh قزقاوه
- Village
- Location within Iran
- Coordinates: 35°23′00″N 60°16′37″E
- Country: Iran
- Province: Razavi Khorasan
- County: Torbat-e Jam
- Bakhsh: Nasrabad
- Rural District: Bala Jam

Population (2006)
  - Total: 143
- Time zone: UTC+3:30 (IRST)
  - Summer (DST): UTC+4:30 (IRDT)

Qazqaveh (Persian: قزقاوه, also Romanized as Qazqāveh; also known as Moḩammadābād) is a village in Bala Jam Rural District, Nasrabad District, Torbat-e Jam County, Razavi Khorasan Province, Iran. At the 2006 census, its population was 143, in 37 families.
