= Mohammadabad-e Qaleh Shahid =

Mohammadabad-e Qaleh Shahid محمدابادقلعه شهيد
- Village
- Country: Iran
- Province: Kerman
- County: Narmashir
- Bakhsh: Central
- Rural District: Posht Rud

Population (2006)
  - Total: 55
- Time zone: UTC+3:30 (IRST)
  - Summer (DST): UTC+4:30 (IRDT)

Mohammadabad-e Qaleh Shahid (Persian: محمدابادقلعه شهيد, also Romanized as Moḩammadābād-e Qal‘eh Shahīd) is a village in Posht Rud Rural District, in the Central District of Narmashir County, Kerman Province, Iran. At the 2006 census, its population was 55, in 13 families.
