= Mohammadabad-e Rud Shur =

Mohammadabad-e Rud Shur محمداباد رودشور
- Village
- Location within Iran
- Coordinates: 28°37′35″N 59°07′22″E
- Country: Iran
- Province: Kerman
- County: Rigan
- Bakhsh: Central
- Rural District: Rigan

Population (2006)
  - Total: 479
- Time zone: UTC+3:30 (IRST)
  - Summer (DST): UTC+4:30 (IRDT)

Mohammadabad-e Rud Shur (Persian: محمداباد رودشور, also Romanized as Moḩammadābād-e Rūd Shūr and Moḩammadābād-e Rūdshūr) is a village in Rigan Rural District, in the Central District of Rigan County, Kerman Province, Iran. At the 2006 census, its population was 479, in 100 families.
