= Mohammadabad, Jereh and Baladeh =

Mohammadabad محمداباد
- Village
- Location within Iran
- Coordinates: 29°13′42″N 51°57′55″E
- Country: Iran
- Province: Fars
- County: Kazerun
- Bakhsh: Jereh and Baladeh
- Rural District: Jereh

Population (2006)
  - Total: 148
- Time zone: UTC+3:30 (IRST)
  - Summer (DST): UTC+4:30 (IRDT)

Mohammadabad (Persian: محمداباد, also Romanized as Moḩammadābād; also known as Moḩammadābād-e Jereh) is a village in Jereh Rural District, Jereh and Baladeh District, Kazerun County, Fars province, Iran. At the 2006 census, its population was 148, in 29 families.
