= Mohammadabad-e Kareyan =

Mohammadabad-e Kareyan محمد آباد كريان
- Village
- Location within Iran
- Coordinates: 35°04′47″N 47°10′40″E
- Country: Iran
- Province: Kurdistan
- County: Kamyaran
- Bakhsh: Muchesh
- Rural District: Amirabad

Population (2006)
  - Total: 336
- Time zone: UTC+3:30 (IRST)
  - Summer (DST): UTC+4:30 (IRDT)

Mohammadabad-e Kareyan (Persian: محمد آباد كريان, also Romanized as Moḩammadābād-e Kareyān and Moḩammadābād-e Karīān; also known as Kīriyān, Moḩammadābād, and Muhammadābād) is a village in Amirabad Rural District, Muchesh District, Kamyaran County, Kurdistan Province, Iran. At the 2006 census, its population was 336, in 77 families. The village is populated by Kurds.
