= Mahmudabad, Sarvabad =

Mahmudabad محمود آباد
- Village
- Location within Iran
- Coordinates: 35°18′16″N 46°22′16″E
- Country: Iran
- Province: Kurdistan
- County: Sarvabad
- Bakhsh: Central
- Rural District: Razab

Population (2006)
  - Total: 14
- Time zone: UTC+3:30 (IRST)
  - Summer (DST): UTC+4:30 (IRDT)

Mahmudabad (Persian: محمود آباد, also Romanized as Maḩmūdābād; also known as Maḩmūdābād-e Sheykh ‘Os̄mān) is a village in Razab Rural District, in the Central District of Sarvabad County, Kurdistan Province, Iran. At the 2006 census, its population was 14, in 4 families. The village is populated by Kurds.
