= Mohammadabad-e Bab Skakan =

Mohammadabad-e Bab Skakan محمداباد باب سكاكان
- Village
- Location within Iran
- Coordinates: 29°12′22″N 57°21′08″E
- Country: Iran
- Province: Kerman
- County: Jiroft
- Bakhsh: Sarduiyeh
- Rural District: Sarduiyeh

Population (2006)
  - Total: 418
- Time zone: UTC+3:30 (IRST)
  - Summer (DST): UTC+4:30 (IRDT)

Mohammadabad-e Bab Skakan (Persian: محمداباد باب سكاكان, also Romanized as Moḩammadābād-e Bāb Skākān; also known as Moḩammadābād) is a village in Sarduiyeh Rural District, Sarduiyeh District, Jiroft County, Kerman Province, Iran. At the 2006 census, its population was 418, in 72 families.
