= Mohammadabad, Shahin Dezh =

Mohammadabad محمداباد
- Village
- Location within Iran
- Coordinates: 36°51′51″N 46°20′18″E
- Country: Iran
- Province: West Azerbaijan
- County: Shahin Dezh
- Bakhsh: Keshavarz
- Rural District: Keshavarz

Population (2006)
  - Total: 240
- Time zone: UTC+3:30 (IRST)
  - Summer (DST): UTC+4:30 (IRDT)

Mohammadabad (Persian: محمداباد, also Romanized as Moḩammadābād) is a village in Keshavarz Rural District, Keshavarz District, Shahin Dezh County, West Azerbaijan Province, Iran. At the 2006 census, its population was 240, in 56 families.
