= Mohammadabad, Rabor =

Mohammadabad محمداباد
- Village
- Location within Iran
- Coordinates: 29°15′21″N 57°02′58″E
- Country: Iran
- Province: Kerman
- County: Rabor
- Bakhsh: Hanza
- Rural District: Javaran

Population (2006)
  - Total: 122
- Time zone: UTC+3:30 (IRST)
  - Summer (DST): UTC+4:30 (IRDT)

Mohammadabad (Persian: محمداباد, also Romanized as Moḩammadābād) is a village in Javaran Rural District, Hanza District, Rabor County, Kerman Province, Iran. At the 2006 census, its population was 122, in 26 families.
