= Mohammadabad-e Chulak =

Mohammadabad-e Chulak محمدابادچولك
- Village
- Location within Iran
- Coordinates: 34°14′48″N 48°18′16″E
- Country: Iran
- Province: Hamadan
- County: Nahavand
- Bakhsh: Central
- Rural District: Tariq ol Eslam

Population (2006)
  - Total: 174
- Time zone: UTC+3:30 (IRST)
  - Summer (DST): UTC+4:30 (IRDT)

Mohammadabad-e Chulak (Persian: محمدابادچولك, also Romanized as Moḩammadābād-e Chūlak; also known as Moḩammadābād) is a village in Tariq ol Eslam Rural District, in the Central District of Nahavand County, Hamadan Province, Iran. At the 2006 census, its population was 174, in 48 families.
