= Mahmudabad, Qatruyeh =

Mahmudabad محموداباد
- Village
- Location within Iran
- Coordinates: 28°49′46″N 55°01′49″E
- Country: Iran
- Province: Fars
- County: Neyriz
- Bakhsh: Qatruyeh
- Rural District: Rizab

Population (2006)
  - Total: 78
- Time zone: UTC+3:30 (IRST)
  - Summer (DST): UTC+4:30 (IRDT)

Mahmudabad (Persian: محموداباد, also Romanized as Maḩmūdābād) is a village in Rizab Rural District, Qatruyeh District, Neyriz County, Fars province, Iran. At the 2006 census, its population was 78, in 17 families.
