= Mohammadabad-e Ali Akbar Khan =

Mohammadabad-e Ali Akbar Khan محمد آباد علي اكبر خان
- Village
- Location within Iran
- Coordinates: 36°05′48″N 47°36′10″E
- Country: Iran
- Province: Kurdistan
- County: Bijar
- Bakhsh: Central
- Rural District: Seylatan

Population (2006)
  - Total: 62
- Time zone: UTC+3:30 (IRST)
  - Summer (DST): UTC+4:30 (IRDT)

Mohammadabad-e Ali Akbar Khan (Persian: محمد آباد علي اكبر خان, also Romanized as Moḩammadābād-e ‘Alī Akbar Khān) is a village in Seylatan Rural District, in the Central District of Bijar County, Kurdistan Province, Iran. At the 2006 census, its population was 62, in 11 families. The village is populated by Kurds.
