= Mohammadpur, Firozabad =

Village in Uttar Pradesh, India

Mohammadpur
- Village
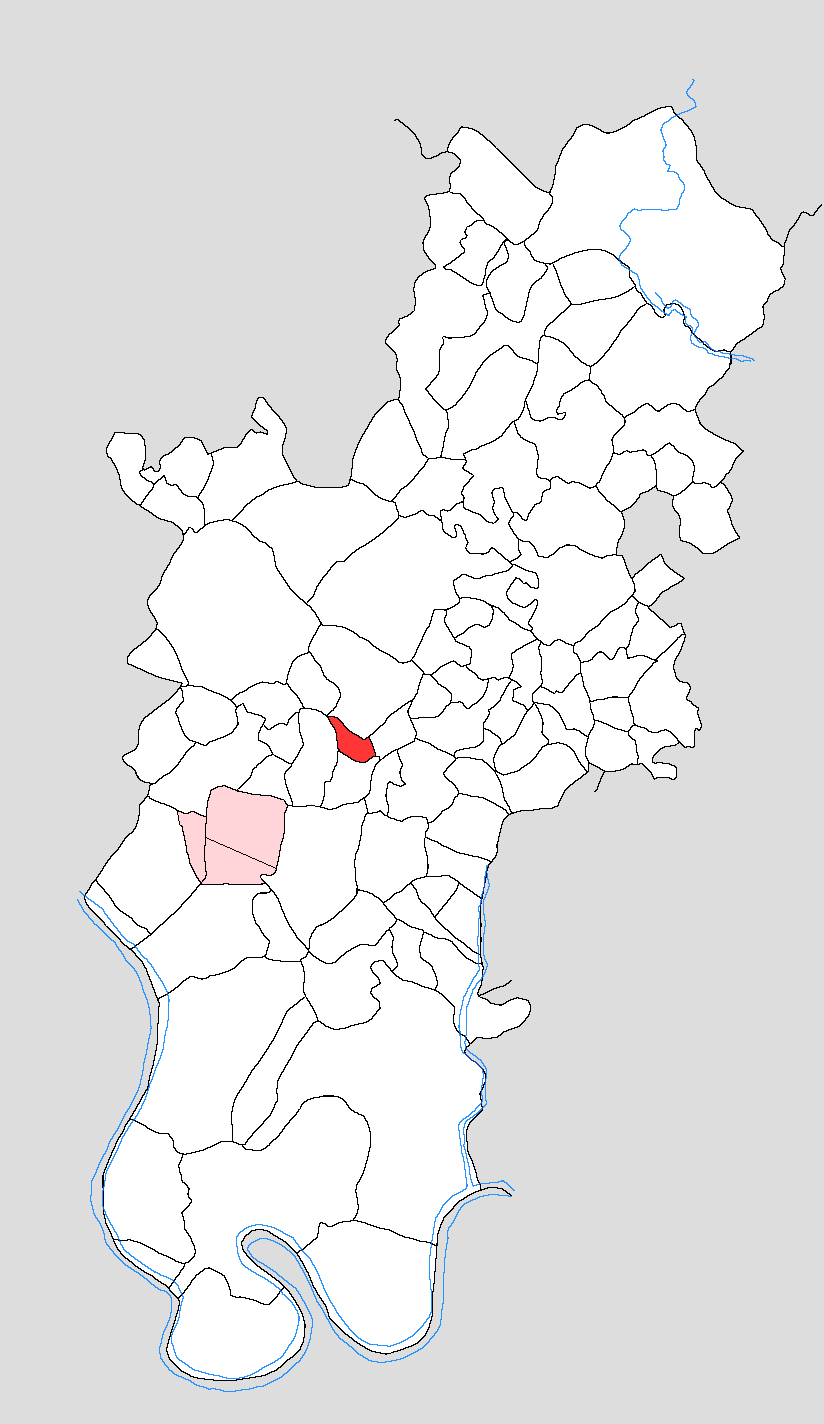
- Map showing Mohammadpur in Tundla block

- Location in Uttar Pradesh, India
- Coordinates: 27.23411°N 78.26823°E
- Country: India
- State: Uttar Pradesh
- District: Firozabad
- Tehsil: Tundla

Area
  - Total: 0.832 km^{2} (0.321 sq mi)

Population (2011)
  - Total: 754
  - Density: 906/km^{2} (2,350/sq mi)
- Time zone: UTC+5:30 (IST)
- PIN: 283204

Mohammadpur (Mohammadpur) is a village in Tundla block of Firozabad district, Uttar Pradesh. As of 2011, it has a population of 754, in 131 households.

== Demographics ==
As of 2011, Mohammadpur had a population of 754, in 131 households. This population was 53.1% male (400) and 46.9% female (354). The 0-6 age group numbered 104 (51 male and 53 female), making up 13.8% of the total population. 358 residents were members of Scheduled Castes, or 47.5% of the total.

The 1981 census recorded Mohammadpur as having a population of 901 people (479 male and 422 female), in 144 households and 144 physical houses.

The 1961 census recorded Mohammadpur as comprising 1 hamlet, with a total population of 344 people (196 male and 148 female), in 68 households and 54 physical houses. The area of the village was given as 209 acres.

== Infrastructure ==
As of 2011, Mohammadpur had 1 primary school; it did not have any healthcare facilities. Drinking water was provided by tap and hand pump; there were no public toilets. The village had a public library but no post office; there was at least some access to electricity for all purposes. Streets were made of pakka materials.
