= Sarteliha =

Sarteliha سرتليها
- Village
- Location within Iran
- Coordinates: 32°07′33″N 49°27′42″E
- Country: Iran
- Province: Khuzestan
- County: Andika
- Bakhsh: Abezhdan
- Rural District: Abezhdan

Population (2006)
  - Total: 155
- Time zone: UTC+3:30 (IRST)
  - Summer (DST): UTC+4:30 (IRDT)

Sarteliha (Persian: سرتليها, also Romanized as Sartelīhā; also known as Moḩammad ‘Alīābād) is a village in Abezhdan Rural District, Abezhdan District, Andika County, Khuzestan Province, Iran. At the 2006 census, its population was 155, in 23 families.
