= Mahmudabad-e Gavkol =

Mahmudabad-e Gavkol محمودابادگاوكل
- Village
- Location within Iran
- Coordinates: 34°26′12″N 47°34′34″E
- Country: Iran
- Province: Kermanshah
- County: Sahneh
- Bakhsh: Central
- Rural District: Gamasiyab

Population (2006)
  - Total: 338
- Time zone: UTC+3:30 (IRST)
  - Summer (DST): UTC+4:30 (IRDT)

Mahmudabad-e Gavkol (Persian: محمودابادگاوكل, also Romanized as Maḩmūdābād-e Gāvkol; also known as Maḩmūdābād) is a village in Gamasiyab Rural District, in the Central District of Sahneh County, Kermanshah Province, Iran. At the 2006 census, its population was 338, in 84 families.
