= Mohammadabad-e Do Khaneh =

Mohammadabad-e Do Khaneh محمداباددوخانه
- Village
- Location within Iran
- Coordinates: 36°08′36″N 58°47′36″E
- Country: Iran
- Province: Razavi Khorasan
- County: Nishapur
- Bakhsh: Central
- Rural District: Mazul

Population (2006)
  - Total: 119
- Time zone: UTC+3:30 (IRST)
  - Summer (DST): UTC+4:30 (IRDT)

Mohammadabad-e Do Khaneh (Persian: محمداباددوخانه, also Romanized as Moḩammadābād-e Do Khāneh; also known as Moḩammadābād) is a village in Mazul Rural District, in the Central District of Nishapur County, Razavi Khorasan Province, Iran. At the 2006 census, its population was 119, in 31 families.
