= Mohammadabad-e Sar Haddi =

Mohammadabad-e Sar Haddi محمدابادسرحدي
- Village
- Location within Iran
- Coordinates: 28°40′46″N 58°58′55″E
- Country: Iran
- Province: Kerman
- County: Rigan
- Bakhsh: Central
- Rural District: Rigan

Population (2006)
  - Total: 385
- Time zone: UTC+3:30 (IRST)
  - Summer (DST): UTC+4:30 (IRDT)

Mohammadabad-e Sar Haddi (Persian: محمدابادسرحدي, also Romanized as Moḩammadābād-e Sar Ḩaddī and Moḩammadābād-e Sarḩadī; also known as Moḩammadābād-e Seyyed ‘Alī Khān) is a village in Rigan Rural District, in the Central District of Rigan County, Kerman Province, Iran. At the 2006 census, its population was 385, in 87 families.
