= Mohammadabad-e Kalantar =

Village in Kerman province, Iran

Mohammadabad-e Kalantar Persian: محمدابادكلانتر
- Village
- Location within Iran
- Coordinates: 28°17′43″N 57°46′24″E
- Country: Iran
- Province: Kerman
- County: Jiroft
- District: Esmaili
- Rural District: Ganjabad

Population (2016)
  - Total: 172
- Time zone: UTC+3:30 (IRST)

Mohammadabad-e Kalantar (Persian: محمدابادكلانتر) (Note: Also romanized as Moḩammadābād-e Kalāntar; also known as Moḩammadābād) is a village in Ganjabad Rural District of Esmaili District, Jiroft County, Kerman province, Iran.

== Demographics ==
=== Population ===
At the time of the 2006 National Census, the village's population was 150 in 35 households, when it was in Anbarabad County. The following census of 2011 counted 147 inhabitants in 41 households, by which time the district had been separated from the county to join Jiroft County. The 2016 census measured the population of the village as 172 in 54 households.
