= Mahmudabad, Shahr-e Babak =

Mahmudabad محموداباد
- Village
- Location within Iran
- Coordinates: 30°33′16″N 54°40′21″E
- Country: Iran
- Province: Kerman
- County: Shahr-e Babak
- Bakhsh: Dehaj
- Rural District: Khabar

Population (2006)
  - Total: 37
- Time zone: UTC+3:30 (IRST)
  - Summer (DST): UTC+4:30 (IRDT)

Mahmudabad (Persian: محموداباد, also Romanized as Maḩmūdābād; also known as Maḩmūdābād-e Vābasteh Beh Khabr) is a village in Khabar Rural District, Dehaj District, Shahr-e Babak County, Kerman Province, Iran. At the 2006 census, its population was 37, in 5 families.
