= Mohammadabad-e Saqi =

Mohammadabad-e Saqi محمدابادساقي
- Village
- Location within Iran
- Coordinates: 30°38′24″N 55°31′08″E
- Country: Iran
- Province: Kerman
- County: Rafsanjan
- Bakhsh: Koshkuiyeh
- Rural District: Sharifabad

Population (2006)
  - Total: 1,782
- Time zone: UTC+3:30 (IRST)
  - Summer (DST): UTC+4:30 (IRDT)

Mohammadabad-e Saqi (Persian: محمدابادساقي, also Romanized as Moḩammadābād-e Sāqī) is a village in Sharifabad Rural District, Koshkuiyeh District, Rafsanjan County, Kerman Province, Iran. At the 2006 census, its population was 1,782, in 425 families.
