= Mahmudabad-e Kashantu =

Mahmudabad-e Kashantu محمودابادكاشانتو
- Village
- Location within Iran
- Coordinates: 34°26′29″N 47°27′07″E
- Country: Iran
- Province: Kermanshah
- County: Harsin
- Bakhsh: Bisotun
- Rural District: Cham Chamal

Population (2006)
  - Total: 254
- Time zone: UTC+3:30 (IRST)
  - Summer (DST): UTC+4:30 (IRDT)

Mahmudabad-e Kashantu (Persian: محمودابادكاشانتو, also Romanized as Maḩmūdābād-e Kāshāntū; also known as Maḩmūdābād) is a village in Cham Chamal Rural District, Bisotun District, Harsin County, Kermanshah Province, Iran. At the 2006 census, its population was 254, in 56 families.
