= Mohammadabad-e Kharzeh =

Mohammadabad-e Kharzeh محمد آباد خرزه
- Village
- Location within Iran
- Coordinates: 35°27′15″N 47°19′25″E
- Country: Iran
- Province: Kurdistan
- County: Dehgolan
- Bakhsh: Central
- Rural District: Yeylan-e Shomali

Population (2006)
  - Total: 64
- Time zone: UTC+3:30 (IRST)
  - Summer (DST): UTC+4:30 (IRDT)

Mohammadabad-e Kharzeh (Persian: محمد آباد خرزه, also Romanized as Moḩammadābād-e Kharzeh; also known as Moḩammadābād) is a village in Yeylan-e Shomali Rural District, in the Central District of Dehgolan County, Kurdistan Province, Iran.

== Demographics ==
At the 2006 census, its population was 64, in 14 families. The village is populated by Kurds.
