= Mohammadabad (village), Rigan =

Mohammadabad محمد آباد
- Village
- Location within Iran
- Coordinates: 28°35′09″N 59°09′50″E
- Country: Iran
- Province: Kerman
- County: Rigan
- Bakhsh: Central
- Rural District: Rigan

Population (2006)
  - Total: 38
- Time zone: UTC+3:30 (IRST)
  - Summer (DST): UTC+4:30 (IRDT)

Mohammadabad (Persian: محمد آباد , also Romanized as Moḩammadābād) is a village in Rigan Rural District, in the Central District of Rigan County, Kerman Province, Iran. At the 2006 census, its population was 38, in 8 families.
