= Mahmudabad, Bid Zard =

Mahmudabad محموداباد
- Village
- Location within Iran
- Coordinates: 29°21′46″N 52°38′09″E
- Country: Iran
- Province: Fars
- County: Shiraz
- Bakhsh: Central
- Rural District: Bid Zard

Population (2006)
  - Total: 900
- Time zone: UTC+3:30 (IRST)
  - Summer (DST): UTC+4:30 (IRDT)

Mahmudabad (Persian: محموداباد, also Romanized as Maḩmūdābād; also known as Maḩmūdābād-e Sakhteman) is a village in Bid Zard Rural District, in the Central District of Shiraz County, Fars province, Iran. At the 2006 census, its population was 900, in 216 families.
