= Mohammadabad-e Seyyed =

Mohammadabad-e Seyyed محمدابادسيد
- Village
- Location within Iran
- Coordinates: 28°54′22″N 58°41′11″E
- Country: Iran
- Province: Kerman
- County: Narmashir
- Bakhsh: Central
- Rural District: Azizabad

Population (2006)
  - Total: 572
- Time zone: UTC+3:30 (IRST)
  - Summer (DST): UTC+4:30 (IRDT)

Mohammadabad-e Seyyed (Persian: محمدابادسيد, also Romanized as Moḩammadābād-e Seyyed, Moḩammadābād Seyed, and Mohammad Abad Seyyed) is a village in Azizabad Rural District, in the Central District of Narmashir County, Kerman Province, Iran. At the 2006 census, its population was 572, in 146 families.
