= Mahmudabad-e Hoseyn Safar =

Village in Kerman, Iran

Mahmudabad-e Hoseyn Safar محمودابادحسين صفر
- Village
- Location within Iran
- Coordinates: 29°25′29″N 55°34′24″E
- Country: Iran
- Province: Kerman
- County: Sirjan
- Bakhsh: Central
- Rural District: Sharifabad

Population (2006)
  - Total: 20
- Time zone: UTC+3:30 (IRST)
  - Summer (DST): UTC+4:30 (IRDT)

Mahmudabad-e Hoseyn Safar (Persian: محمودابادحسين صفر, also Romanized as Maḩmūdābād-e Ḩoseyn Şafar; also known as Mahmood Abad, Maḩmūdābād, and Maḩmūdābād-e Ḩoseyn) is a village in Sharifabad Rural District, in the Central District of Sirjan County, Kerman Province, Iran. At the 2006 census, its population was 20, in 5 families.
