= Mahmudabad, Babol =

Mahmudabad محمودآباد
- Village
- Location within Iran
- Coordinates: 36°33′26″N 52°43′00″E
- Country: Iran
- Province: Mazandaran
- County: Babol
- Bakhsh: Central
- Rural District: Feyziyeh

Population (2016)
  - Total: 374
- Time zone: UTC+3:30 (IRST)

Mahmudabad (Persian: محمودآباد, also Romanized as Maḩmūdābād) is a village in Feyziyeh Rural District, in the Central District of Babol County, Mazandaran Province, Iran.

At the time of the 2006 National Census, the village's population was 259 in 59 households. The following census in 2011 counted 290 people in 78 households. The 2016 census measured the population of the village as 374 people in 109 households.
