= Shah Mahmud, Iran =

Shah Mahmud شاه محمود
- Village
- Location within Iran
- Coordinates: 32°32′14″N 59°02′09″E
- Country: Iran
- Province: South Khorasan
- County: Khusf
- Bakhsh: Jolgeh-e Mazhan
- Rural District: Jolgeh-e Mazhan

Population (2006)
  - Total: 25
- Time zone: UTC+3:30 (IRST)
  - Summer (DST): UTC+4:30 (IRDT)

Shah Mahmud (Persian: شاه محمود, also Romanized as Shāh Maḩmūd and Shah Mahmood; also known as Shāh Maḩmūd-e Pā’īn and Maḩmūdābād) is a village in Jolgeh-e Mazhan Rural District, Jolgeh-e Mazhan District, Khusf County, South Khorasan Province, Iran. At the 2006 census, its population was 25, in 7 families.
