= Mahmudiyeh, Hamadan =

Mahmudiyeh محموديه
- Village
- Location within Iran
- Coordinates: 34°24′13″N 48°07′13″E
- Country: Iran
- Province: Hamadan
- County: Nahavand
- Bakhsh: Khezel
- Rural District: Khezel-e Sharqi

Population (2006)
  - Total: 91
- Time zone: UTC+3:30 (IRST)
  - Summer (DST): UTC+4:30 (IRDT)

Mahmudiyeh (Persian: محموديه, also Romanized as Maḩmūdīyeh; also known as Maḩmūdābād and Maḩmūd Dīvāneh) is a village in Khezel-e Sharqi Rural District, Khezel District, Nahavand County, Hamadan Province, Iran. At the 2006 census, its population was 91, in 17 families.
