= Mahmudabad, Javanrud =

Mahmudabad محمود اباد
- Village
- Location within Iran
- Coordinates: 34°46′29″N 46°30′00″E
- Country: Iran
- Province: Kermanshah
- County: Javanrud
- Bakhsh: Central
- Rural District: Palanganeh

Population (2006)
  - Total: 65
- Time zone: UTC+3:30 (IRST)
  - Summer (DST): UTC+4:30 (IRDT)

Mahmudabad (Persian: محمود اباد, also Romanized as Maḩmūdābād; also known as Ḩowz Kholeh) is a village in Palanganeh Rural District, in the Central District of Javanrud County, Kermanshah Province, Iran. At the 2006 census, its population was 65, in 12 families.
