= Mahmudi, Yazd =

Mahmudi محمودي
- Village
- Location within Iran
- Coordinates: 31°56′24″N 54°22′29″E
- Country: Iran
- Province: Yazd
- County: Yazd
- Bakhsh: Central
- Rural District: Fahraj

Population (2006)
  - Total: 30
- Time zone: UTC+3:30 (IRST)
  - Summer (DST): UTC+4:30 (IRDT)

Mahmudi (Persian: محمودي, also Romanized as Maḩmūdī; also known as Ahranābād, Mahmood Abad Hoomeh, and Maḩmūdābād) is a village in Fahraj Rural District, in the Central District of Yazd County, Yazd Province, Iran. At the 2006 census, its population was 30, in 7 families.
