= Mohammadabad-e Deh Gavi =

Mohammadabad-e Deh Gavi محمداباددهگاوي
- Village
- Location within Iran
- Coordinates: 28°46′42″N 59°07′44″E
- Country: Iran
- Province: Kerman
- County: Fahraj
- Bakhsh: Negin Kavir
- Rural District: Chahdegal

Population (2006)
  - Total: 619
- Time zone: UTC+3:30 (IRST)
  - Summer (DST): UTC+4:30 (IRDT)

Mohammadabad-e Deh Gavi (Persian: محمداباددهگاوي, also Romanized as Moḩammadābād-e Deh Gāvī; also known as Mohammad Ābād and Moḩammadābād-e Deh Gārī) is a village in Chahdegal Rural District, Negin Kavir District, Fahraj County, Kerman Province, Iran. At the 2006 census, its population was 619, in 165 families.
