= Mohammadabad, Neh =

Mohammadabad محمداباد
- Village
- Location within Iran
- Coordinates: 31°46′54″N 59°48′53″E
- Country: Iran
- Province: South Khorasan
- County: Nehbandan
- Bakhsh: Central
- Rural District: Neh

Population (2006)
  - Total: 110
- Time zone: UTC+3:30 (IRST)
  - Summer (DST): UTC+4:30 (IRDT)

Mohammadabad (Persian: محمداباد, also Romanized as Moḩammadābād) is a village in Neh Rural District, in the Central District of Nehbandan County, South Khorasan Province, Iran. At the 2006 census, its population was 110, in 26 families.
