= Mohammadabad-e Padgan =

Mohammadabad-e Padgan محمد اباد پدگان
- Village
- Location within Iran
- Coordinates: 28°01′05″N 60°36′54″E
- Country: Iran
- Province: Sistan and Baluchestan
- County: Khash
- Bakhsh: Central
- Rural District: Karvandar

Population (2006)
  - Total: 85
- Time zone: UTC+3:30 (IRST)
  - Summer (DST): UTC+4:30 (IRDT)

Mohammadabad-e Padgan (Persian: محمد اباد پدگان, also Romanized as Moḩammadābād-e Padgān; also known as Moḩammadābād) is a village in Karvandar Rural District, in the Central District of Khash County, Sistan and Baluchestan Province, Iran. At the 2006 census, its population was 85, in 18 families.
