= Mohammadpur Umri =

Mohammadpur Chail
- village
- Location in Uttar Pradesh, India Mohammadpur Chail (India)
- Coordinates: 25.44°N 81.74°E
- Country: India
- State: Uttar Pradesh
- District: Prayagraj
- Established: late 1890s
- Named for: Mohammad Nasir

Area
  - Total: 80,000 km^{2} (31,000 sq mi)

Population
  - Total: 6,000
  - Density: 0.075/km^{2} (0.19/sq mi)

Languages
  - Official: Hindi
- Time zone: UTC+5:30 (IST)
- PIN: 276202
- Nearest city: Prayagraj

Mohammadpur Chail is a small village close to the Indian Air Force base of Bamrauli, near Prayagraj in Uttar Pradesh, India. Mohammadpur was founded by Mohammad Nasir. He had five children, consisting four sons and one daughter. Mohammad Nasir and his ancestors, for example Mohammad Yusuf, his father, Mohammad Hussain, his grandfather, etc. and his sons are all buried in a personal graveyard owned by his family, which is 2,000 square meters in area.

== Twin statistics ==
The village has a large number of twins and is therefore sometimes labelled as the twin capital of the world. Out of a total population of 600, there are almost 33 pairs of twins here. The village has a twin monozygotic (MZ) or identical twin birth rate that is 300 times the national average and may be one of the highest in the world.
