= Mohammadabad-e Moshk =

Mohammadabad-e Moshk محمدابادمشك
- Village
- Location within Iran
- Coordinates: 28°54′14″N 58°33′08″E
- Country: Iran
- Province: Kerman
- County: Narmashir
- Bakhsh: Rud Ab
- Rural District: Rud Ab-e Sharqi

Population (2006)
  - Total: 188
- Time zone: UTC+3:30 (IRST)
  - Summer (DST): UTC+4:30 (IRDT)

Mohammadabad-e Moshk (Persian: محمدابادمشك, also Romanized as Moḩammadābād-e Moshk; also known as Mahammābād, Moḩammadābād, Moḩammadābād-e Moshg, Moḩammadābād-e Posht-e Rīg, and Muhammadābād) is a village in Rud Ab-e Sharqi Rural District, Rud Ab District, Narmashir County, Kerman Province, Iran. At the 2006 census, its population was 188, in 40 families.
