= Mahmudabad, Nahavand =

Mahmudabad محموداباد
- Village
- Location within Iran
- Coordinates: 34°04′47″N 48°25′46″E
- Country: Iran
- Province: Hamadan
- County: Nahavand
- Bakhsh: Central
- Rural District: Gamasiyab

Population (2006)
  - Total: 416
- Time zone: UTC+3:30 (IRST)
  - Summer (DST): UTC+4:30 (IRDT)

Mahmudabad (Persian: محموداباد, also Romanized as Maḩmūdābād and Mahmood Abad; also known as Sālārābād) is a village in Gamasiyab Rural District, in the Central District of Nahavand County, Hamadan Province, Iran. At the 2006 census, its population was 416, in 111 families.
