= Mohammadabad-e Meysam =

Mohammadabad-e Meysam محمدابادميثم
- Village
- Location within Iran
- Coordinates: 30°22′34″N 56°04′32″E
- Country: Iran
- Province: Kerman
- County: Rafsanjan
- Bakhsh: Central
- Rural District: Kabutar Khan

Population (2006)
  - Total: 1,636
- Time zone: UTC+3:30 (IRST)
  - Summer (DST): UTC+4:30 (IRDT)

Mohammadabad-e Meysam (Persian: محمدابادميثم, also Romanized as Moḩammadābād-e Meys̱am) is a village in Kabutar Khan Rural District, in the Central District of Rafsanjan County, Kerman Province, Iran. At the 2006 census, its population was 1,636, in 400 families.
