= Mahmudabad, Mahabad =

Mahmudabad محمودآباد
- village
- Location within Iran
- Coordinates: 36°28′00″N 45°35′23″E
- Country: Iran
- Province: West Azerbaijan
- County: Mahabad
- Bakhsh: Khalifan
- Rural District: Mangur-e Sharqi

Population (2006)
  - Total: 73
- Time zone: UTC+3:30 (IRST)
  - Summer (DST): UTC+4:30 (IRDT)

Mahmudabad (Persian: محمودآباد, also Romanized as Maḩmūdābād) is a village in Mangur-e Sharqi Rural District, Khalifan District, Mahabad County, West Azerbaijan Province, Iran. At the 2006 census, its population was 73, in 9 families.
