= Mahmudabad, Ajab Shir =

Mahmudabad محموداباد
- Village
- Location within Iran
- Coordinates: 37°29′26″N 45°56′17″E
- Country: Iran
- Province: East Azerbaijan
- County: Ajab Shir
- Bakhsh: Qaleh Chay
- Rural District: Dizajrud-e Sharqi

Population (2006)
  - Total: 411
- Time zone: UTC+3:30 (IRST)
  - Summer (DST): UTC+4:30 (IRDT)

Mahmudabad (Persian: محموداباد, also Romanized as Maḩmūdābād; also known as Pīsh Ravābād (Persian: پيش رواباد) and Pīsh Robāţ) is a village in Dizajrud-e Sharqi Rural District, Qaleh Chay District, Ajab Shir County, East Azerbaijan Province, Iran. At the 2006 census, its population was 411, in 108 families.
