= Mohammadabad-e Anbari =

Mohammadabad-e Anbari محمدآباد عنبری
- Village
- Location within Iran
- Coordinates: 28°13′56″N 57°32′34″E
- Country: Iran
- Province: Kerman
- County: Jiroft
- Bakhsh: Esmaili
- Rural District: Ganjabad

Population (2006)
  - Total: 63
- Time zone: UTC+3:30 (IRST)
  - Summer (DST): UTC+4:30 (IRDT)

Mohammadabad-e Anbari (Persian: محمدآباد عنبری, also Romanized as Moḩammadābād-e ʿAnbarī; also known as Moḩammadābād and Moḩammadābād-e Pā’īn) is a village in Ganjabad Rural District, Esmaili District, Jiroft County, Kerman Province, Iran. At the 2006 census, its population was 63, in 11 families.
