= Mahmudabad Mazaheri =

Village in Kerman province, Iran

Mahmudabad Mazaheri Persian: محمودابادمظاهري
- Village
- Location within Iran
- Coordinates: 28°18′35″N 57°36′52″E
- Country: Iran
- Province: Kerman
- County: Jiroft
- District: Esmaili
- Rural District: Ganjabad

Population (2016)
  - Total: 0
- Time zone: UTC+3:30 (IRST)

Mahmudabad Mazaheri (Persian: محمودابادمظاهري) (Note: Also romanized as Maḩmūdābād Maz̧āherī and Mahmood Abad Mazaheri; also known as Maḩmūdābād and Moḩammadābād) is a village in Ganjabad Rural District of Esmaili District, Jiroft County, Kerman province, Iran.

== Demographics ==
=== Population ===
At the time of the 2006 National Census, the village's population was 21 in four households, when it was in Anbarabad County. The village did not appear in the following census of 2011, by which time the district had been separated from the county to join Jiroft County. The 2016 census measured the population of the village as zero.
