= Mahmudabad, Rafsanjan =

Mahmudabad محموداباد
- Village
- Location within Iran
- Coordinates: 30°36′27″N 55°35′46″E
- Country: Iran
- Province: Kerman
- County: Rafsanjan
- Bakhsh: Koshkuiyeh
- Rural District: Sharifabad

Population (2006)
  - Total: 720
- Time zone: UTC+3:30 (IRST)
  - Summer (DST): UTC+4:30 (IRDT)

Mahmudabad (Persian: محموداباد, also Romanized as Maḩmūdābād and Mahmood Abad; also known as Maḩmūdābād-e Moravvej and Moḩammadābād) is a village in Sharifabad Rural District, Koshkuiyeh District, Rafsanjan County, Kerman Province, Iran. At the 2006 census, its population was 720, in 168 families.
