= Mahmudabad-e Sofla, West Azerbaijan =

Mahmudabad-e Sofla محمودابادسفلي
- Village
- Location within Iran
- Coordinates: 36°31′29″N 46°31′11″E
- Country: Iran
- Province: West Azerbaijan
- County: Shahin Dezh
- Bakhsh: Central
- Rural District: Hulasu

Population (2006)
  - Total: 124
- Time zone: UTC+3:30 (IRST)
  - Summer (DST): UTC+4:30 (IRDT)

Mahmudabad-e Sofla (Persian: محمودابادسفلي, also Romanized as Maḩmūdābād-e Soflá and Mahmūdābād-e Soflá) is a village in Hulasu Rural District, in the Central District of Shahin Dezh County, West Azerbaijan Province, Iran. At the 2006 census, its population was 124, in 22 families.
