= Mahmudabad, Khafr =

Village in Fars province, Iran

Mahmudabad Persian: محموداباد
- Village
- Location within Iran
- Coordinates: 28°59′58″N 53°02′29″E
- Country: Iran
- Province: Fars
- County: Khafr
- District: Central
- Rural District: Aliabad

Population (2016)
  - Total: 388
- Time zone: UTC+3:30 (IRST)

Mahmudabad (Persian: محموداباد) (Note: Also romanized as Maḩmūdābād; also known as Moḩammadābād, and Muhammadābād) is a village in Aliabad Rural District of the Central District of Khafr County, Fars province, Iran.

== Demographics ==
=== Population ===
At the time of the 2006 National Census, the village's population was 512 in 128 households, when it was in the former Khafr District of Jahrom County. The following census in 2011 counted 461 people in 132 households. The 2016 census measured the population of the village as 388 people in 128 households.

In 2019, the district was separated from the county in the establishment of Khafr County, and the rural district was transferred to the new Central District.
