= Mahmudabad-e Olya, Kohgiluyeh and Boyer-Ahmad =

Mahmudabad-e Olya محمودابادعليا
- Village
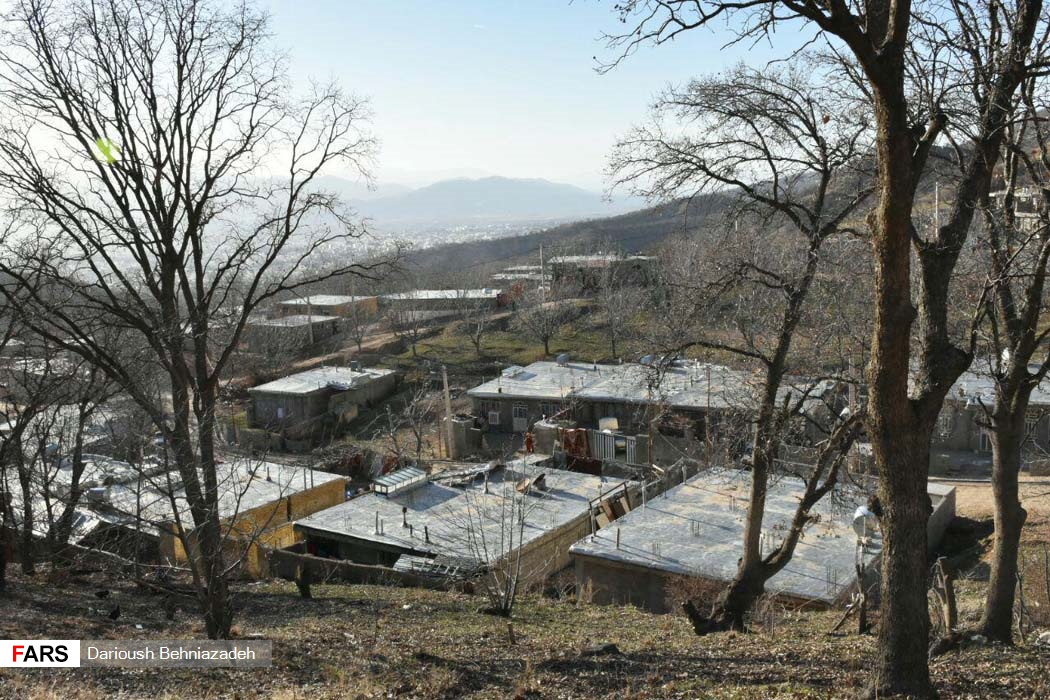

- Location within Iran
- Coordinates: 30°39′23″N 51°38′04″E
- Country: Iran
- Province: Kohgiluyeh and Boyer-Ahmad
- County: Boyer-Ahmad
- Bakhsh: Central
- Rural District: Sarrud-e Shomali

Population (2006)
  - Total: 338
- Time zone: UTC+3:30 (IRST)
  - Summer (DST): UTC+4:30 (IRDT)

Mahmudabad-e Olya (Persian: محمودابادعليا, also Romanized as Maḩmūdābād-e ‘Olyā; also known as Maḩmūdābād-e Bālā) is a village in Sarrud-e Shomali Rural District, in the Central District of Boyer-Ahmad County, Kohgiluyeh and Boyer-Ahmad Province, Iran. At the 2006 census, its population was 338, in 59 families.
