= Mahmudabad-e Yek, Kuh Panj =

Mahmudabad-e Yek محمود آباد1
- Village
- Location within Iran
- Coordinates: 29°57′12″N 56°21′58″E
- Country: Iran
- Province: Kerman
- County: Bardsir
- Bakhsh: Central
- Rural District: Kuh Panj

Population (2006)
  - Total: 127
- Time zone: UTC+3:30 (IRST)
  - Summer (DST): UTC+4:30 (IRDT)

Mahmudabad-e Yek (Persian: محمود آباد1, also Romanized as Maḩmūdābād-e Yek; also known as Maḩmūdābād and Moḩmūdābād) is a village in Kuh Panj Rural District, in the Central District of Bardsir County, Kerman Province, Iran. At the 2006 census, its population was 127, in 29 families.
