= Mohammadabad-e Pain, Sistan and Baluchestan =

Village in Sistan and Baluchestan province, Iran

Mohammadabad-e Pain Persian: محمدابادپايين
- Village
- Location within Iran
- Coordinates: 28°54′21″N 61°18′55″E
- Country: Iran
- Province: Sistan and Baluchestan
- County: Mirjaveh
- District: Ladiz
- Rural District: Ladiz

Population (2016)
  - Total: 115
- Time zone: UTC+3:30 (IRST)

Mohammadabad-e Pain (Persian: محمدابادپايين) (Note: Also romanized as Moḩammadābād-e Pā’īn; also known as Shahīd Moḩammadābād and Moḩammadābād) is a village in Ladiz Rural District of Ladiz District, Mirjaveh County, Sistan and Baluchestan province, Iran.

== Demographics ==
=== Population ===
At the time of the 2006 National Census, the village's population was 110 in 25 households, when it was in the former Mirjaveh District of Zahedan County. The following census in 2011 counted 47 people in 11 households. The 2016 census measured the population of the village as 115 people in 29 households, by which time the district had been separated from the county in the establishment of Mirjaveh County. The rural district was transferred to the new Ladiz District.
