= Mohammadabad-e Olya, Kerman =

Village in Kerman province, Iran

Mohammadabad-e Olya Persian: محمدابادعليا
- Village
- Location within Iran
- Coordinates: 28°20′13″N 57°43′32″E
- Country: Iran
- Province: Kerman
- County: Jiroft
- District: Esmaili
- Rural District: Esmaili

Population (2016)
  - Total: 224
- Time zone: UTC+3:30 (IRST)

Mohammadabad-e Olya (Persian: محمدابادعليا) (Note: Also romanized as Mohammadābād-e ‘Olyā; also known as Mohammadābād-e Bālā, Moḩammadābād-e Bālā, and Moḩammadābād-e Ţūlehgarī) is a village in Esmaili Rural District of Esmaili District, Jiroft County, Kerman province, Iran.

== Demographics ==
=== Population ===
At the time of the 2006 National Census, the village's population was 248 in 46 households, when it was in Anbarabad County. The following census in 2011 counted 303 people in 81 households, by which time the district had been separated from the county to join Jiroft County. The 2016 census measured the population of the village as 224 people in 72 households.
