= Mohammadabad-e Shokur =

Mohammadabad-e Shokur محمدابادشكور
- Village
- Location within Iran
- Coordinates: 30°03′02″N 55°10′41″E
- Country: Iran
- Province: Kerman
- County: Shahr-e Babak
- Bakhsh: Central
- Rural District: Estabraq

Population (2006)
  - Total: 683
- Time zone: UTC+3:30 (IRST)
  - Summer (DST): UTC+4:30 (IRDT)

Mohammadabad-e Shokur (Persian: محمدابادشكور, also Romanized as Moḩammadābād-e Shokūr; also known as Moḩammadābād, Moḩammadābād-e Eshkūl, Moḩammadābād-e Eshkūr, and Maḩmūdābād-e Shakūr) is a village in Estabraq Rural District, in the Central District of Shahr-e Babak County, Kerman Province, Iran. At the 2006 census, its population was 683, in 166 families.
