= Mahmudabad-e Olya, Fasa =

Village in Fars, Iran

Mahmudabad-e Olya محمودابادعليا
- Village
- Location within Iran
- Coordinates: 29°05′43″N 53°29′46″E
- Country: Iran
- Province: Fars
- County: Fasa
- Bakhsh: Central
- Rural District: Jangal

Population (2006)
  - Total: 340
- Time zone: UTC+3:30 (IRST)
  - Summer (DST): UTC+4:30 (IRDT)

Mahmudabad-e Olya (Persian: محمودابادعليا, also Romanized as Maḩmūdābād-e 'Olyā) is a village in Jangal Rural District, in the Central District of Fasa County, Fars province, Iran. At the 2006 census, its population was 340, in 74 families.
