= Mahmudabad-e Olya, Marvdasht =

Mahmudabad-e Olya محمودابادعليا
- Village
- Location within Iran
- Coordinates: 29°51′49″N 53°07′40″E
- Country: Iran
- Province: Fars
- County: Marvdasht
- Bakhsh: Seyyedan
- Rural District: Rahmat

Population (2006)
  - Total: 326
- Time zone: UTC+3:30 (IRST)
  - Summer (DST): UTC+4:30 (IRDT)

Mahmudabad-e Olya (Persian: محمودابادعليا, also Romanized as Maḩmūdābād-e 'Olyā; also known as Maḩmūdābād, Maḩmūdābād-e Khafrak, and Mahmud Abad Khafrak) is a village in Rahmat Rural District, Seyyedan District, Marvdasht County, Fars province, Iran. At the 2006 census, its population was 326, in 83 families.
