= Mohammadabad Rural District (Zarand County) =

Rural district in Kerman province, Iran

Mohammadabad Rural District Persian: دهستان محمدآباد
- Rural District
- Location within Iran
- Coordinates: 30°45′53″N 56°29′43″E
- Country: Iran
- Province: Kerman
- County: Zarand
- District: Central
- Capital: Mohammadabad

Population (2016)
  - Total: 21,440
- Time zone: UTC+3:30 (IRST)

Mohammadabad Rural District (Persian: دهستان محمدآباد) is in the Central District of Zarand County, Kerman province, Iran. Its capital is the village of Mohammadabad.

== Demographics ==
=== Population ===
At the time of the 2006 National Census, the rural district's population was 13,252 in 3,232 households. There were 16,399 inhabitants in 4,520 households at the following census of 2011. The 2016 census measured the population of the rural district as 21,440 in 6,043 households. The most populous of its 26 villages was Shah Jahanabad, with 5,708 people.
