= Mohammadabad-e Sofla, South Khorasan =

Village in South Khorasan province, Iran

Mohammadabad-e Sofla Persian: محمدابادسفلي
- Village
- Location within Iran
- Country: Iran
- Province: South Khorasan
- County: Darmian
- District: Central
- Rural District: Darmian

Population (2016)
  - Total: 82
- Time zone: UTC+3:30 (IRST)

Mohammadabad-e Sofla (Persian: محمدابادسفلي) (Note: Also romanized as Moḩammadābād-e Soflá; also known as Moḩammadābād-e Pā’īn) is a village in Darmian Rural District of the Central District in Darmian County, South Khorasan province, Iran.

== Demographics ==
=== Population ===
At the time of the 2006 National Census, the village's population was 120 in 31 households. The following census in 2011 counted 56 people in 15 households. The 2016 census measured the population of the village as 82 people in 20 households.
