= Mohammadabad-e Sofla, Fars =

Village in Fars province, Iran

Mohammadabad-e Sofla Persian: محمدابادسفلي
- Village
- Location within Iran
- Coordinates: 29°28′04″N 54°27′27″E
- Country: Iran
- Province: Fars
- County: Neyriz
- District: Meshkan
- Rural District: Deh Chah

Population (2016)
  - Total: 11
- Time zone: UTC+3:30 (IRST)

Mohammadabad-e Sofla (Persian: محمدابادسفلي) (Note: Also romanized as Moḩammadābād-e Soflá; also known as Moḩammadābād-e Pā’īn) is a village in Deh Chah Rural District (Note: Formerly Meshkan Rural District) of Meshkan District, (Note: Formerly Poshtkuh District) Neyriz County, Fars province, Iran.

== Demographics ==
=== Population ===
At the time of the 2006 National Census, the village's population was 33 in nine households. The following census in 2011 counted 24 people in 560 seven. The 2016 census measured the population of the village as 11 people in five households.
