= Mohammadiyeh (disambiguation) =

Mohammadiyeh is a city in Alborz Province, Iran.

Mohammadiyeh (Persian: محمديه) may also refer to:

- Mohammadiyeh-e Olya, Hamadan Province
- Mohammadiyeh-e Sofla, Hamadan Province
- Mohammadiyeh, Falavarjan, Isfahan Province
- Mohammadiyeh, Shahreza, Isfahan Province
- Mohammadiyeh, Tiran and Karvan, Isfahan Province
- Mohammadiyeh, Arak, Markazi Province
- Mohammadiyeh, Khomeyn, Markazi Province
- Mohammadiyeh, Rafsanjan, Kerman Province
- Mohammadiyeh, Sirjan, Kerman Province
- Mohammadiyeh, Kashmar, Razavi Khorasan Province
- Mohammadiyeh, Mashhad, Razavi Khorasan Province
- Mohammadiyeh, Darmian, South Khorasan Province
- Mohammadiyeh, Khusf, South Khorasan Province
- Mohammadiyeh, Tabas, South Khorasan Province
- Mohammadiyeh, Yazd
- Mohammadiyeh District, in Alborz Province
- Mohammadiyeh Rural District, in Yazd Province
