= Mohammadabad-e Darvish =

Village in Kerman province, Iran

Mohammadabad-e Darvish Persian: محمداباددرويش
- Village
- Location within Iran
- Coordinates: 29°33′14″N 55°31′45″E
- Country: Iran
- Province: Kerman
- County: Sirjan
- District: Zeydabad
- Rural District: Zeydabad

Population (2016)
  - Total: Below reporting threshold
- Time zone: UTC+3:30 (IRST)

Mohammadabad-e Darvish (Persian: محمداباددرويش) (Note: Also romanized as Moḩammadābād-e Darvīsh; also known as Maḩmūdābād-e Darvīsh) is a village in Zeydabad Rural District of Zeydabad District, Sirjan County, Kerman province, Iran.

== Demographics ==
=== Population ===
At the time of the 2006 National Census, the village's population was 13 in six households, when it was in the Central District. The following census in 2011 counted eight people in four households, by which time the rural district had been separated from the district in the formation of Zeydabad District. The 2016 census measured the population of the village as below the reporting threshold.
