= Mohammadabad-e Tezerj =

Village in Kerman province, Iran

Mohammadabad-e Tezerj Persian: محمدابادتزرج
- Village
- Location within Iran
- Coordinates: 29°18′01″N 56°11′03″E
- Country: Iran
- Province: Kerman
- County: Sirjan
- District: Balvard
- Rural District: Balvard

Population (2016)
  - Total: 154
- Time zone: UTC+3:30 (IRST)

Mohammadabad-e Tezerj (Persian: محمدابادتزرج) (Note: also romanized as Moḩammadābād-e Tezerj; also known as Moḩammadābād, Moḩammadābād-e Tazerch, Moḩammadābād Tazerch, and Muhammadābād) is a village in Balvard Rural District of Balvard District, Sirjan County, Kerman province, Iran.

== Demographics ==
=== Population ===
At the time of the 2006 National Census, the village's population was 93 in 29 households, when it was in the Central District. The following census in 2011 counted 53 people in 21 households, by which time the rural district had been separated from the district in the formation of Balvard District. The 2016 census measured the population of the village as 154 people in 53 households.
