= Darinuiyeh =

Darinuiyeh دارينوئيه
- Village
- Location within Iran
- Coordinates: 29°30′16″N 55°31′12″E
- Country: Iran
- Province: Kerman
- County: Sirjan
- Bakhsh: Central
- Rural District: Zeydabad

Population (2006)
  - Total: 278
- Time zone: UTC+3:30 (IRST)
  - Summer (DST): UTC+4:30 (IRDT)

Darinuiyeh (Persian: دارينوئيه, also Romanized as Dārīnū’īyeh; also known as Ārīnū’īyeh and Dārmīnū’īyeh) is a village in Zeydabad Rural District, in the Central District of Sirjan County, Kerman province, Iran. At the 2006 census, its population was 278, in 65 families.
