= Bezenkuiyeh =

Bezenkuiyeh بزنكوئيه
- Village
- Country: Iran
- Province: Kerman
- County: Sirjan
- Bakhsh: Central
- Rural District: Chahar Gonbad

Population (2006)
  - Total: 20
- Time zone: UTC+3:30 (IRST)
  - Summer (DST): UTC+4:30 (IRDT)

Bezenkuiyeh (Persian: بزنكوئيه, also Romanized as Bezenkū’īyeh) is a village in Chahar Gonbad Rural District, in the Central District of Sirjan County, Kerman Province, Iran. At the 2006 census, its population was 20, in 4 families.
