= Deh Golabi =

Village in Kerman Province, Iran

Deh Golabi ده گلابي
- village
- Country: Iran
- Province: Kerman
- County: Sirjan
- Bakhsh: Central
- Rural District: Chahar Gonbad

Population (2006)
  - Total: 17
- Time zone: UTC+3:30 (IRST)
  - Summer (DST): UTC+4:30 (IRDT)

Deh Golabi (Persian: ده گلابي, also romanized as Dehh-e Golābī) is a village in Chahar Gonbad Rural District, Central District, Sirjan County, Kerman Province, Iran. At the 2006 census, its population was 17, in 4 families.
