= Sarsanguiyeh =

Sarsanguiyeh سرسنگوييه
- Village
- Location within Iran
- Coordinates: 29°37′32″N 56°21′42″E
- Country: Iran
- Province: Kerman
- County: Sirjan
- Bakhsh: Central
- Rural District: Chahar Gonbad

Population (2006)
  - Total: 132
- Time zone: UTC+3:30 (IRST)
  - Summer (DST): UTC+4:30 (IRDT)

Sarsanguiyeh (Persian: سرسنگوييه, also Romanized as Sarsangūīyeh; also known as Sarsangūyeh) is a village in Chahar Gonbad Rural District, in the Central District of Sirjan County, Kerman Province, Iran. At the 2006 census, its population was 132, in 22 families.
