= Sukhteh Chal =

Sukhteh Chal سوخته چال
- Village
- Location within Iran
- Coordinates: 29°36′48″N 55°58′26″E
- Country: Iran
- Province: Kerman
- County: Sirjan
- Bakhsh: Central
- Rural District: Chahar Gonbad
- Time zone: UTC+3:30 (IRST)
  - Summer (DST): UTC+4:30 (IRDT)

Sukhteh Chal (Persian: سوخته چال, also Romanized as Sūkhteh Chāl) is a village in Chahar Gonbad Rural District, in the Central District of Sirjan County, Kerman Province, Iran. At the 2006 census, its existence was noted, however its population has not been reported.
