= Qanat Zarshk-e Sofla =

Qanat Zarshk-e Sofla قنات زرشك سفلي
- Village
- Country: Iran
- Province: Kerman
- County: Sirjan
- Bakhsh: Central
- Rural District: Chahar Gonbad

Population (2006)
  - Total: 19
- Time zone: UTC+3:30 (IRST)
  - Summer (DST): UTC+4:30 (IRDT)

Qanat Zarshk-e Sofla (Persian: قنات زرشك سفلي, also Romanized as Qanāt Zarshk-e Soflá) is a village in Chahar Gonbad Rural District, in the Central District of Sirjan County, Kerman Province, Iran. At the 2006 census, its population was 19, in 5 families.
