= Khosravani =

Khosravani خسرواني
- Village
- Location within Iran
- Coordinates: 29°20′14″N 55°50′03″E
- Country: Iran
- Province: Kerman
- County: Sirjan
- Bakhsh: Central
- Rural District: Malekabad

Population (2006)
  - Total: 1,225
- Time zone: UTC+3:30 (IRST)
  - Summer (DST): UTC+4:30 (IRDT)

Khosravani (Persian: خسرواني, also Romanized as Khosravānī and Khosrovānī) is a village in Malekabad Rural District, in the Central District of Sirjan County, Kerman Province, Iran. At the 2006 census, its population was 1,225, in 272 families.
