= Cheshmeh-ye Seyfollahi =

Cheshmeh-ye Seyfollahi چشمه سيف الهي
- Village
- Country: Iran
- Province: Kerman
- County: Sirjan
- Bakhsh: Central
- Rural District: Balvard

Population (2006)
  - Total: 39
- Time zone: UTC+3:30 (IRST)
  - Summer (DST): UTC+4:30 (IRDT)

Cheshmeh-ye Seyfollahi (Persian: چشمه سيف الهي, also Romanized as Cheshmeh-ye Seyfollahī) is a village in Balvard Rural District, in the Central District of Sirjan County, Kerman Province, Iran. At the 2006 census, its population was 39, in 8 families.
