= Bash Abdan =

Bash Abdan باش ابدان
- Village
- Location within Iran
- Coordinates: 29°17′49″N 56°09′37″E
- Country: Iran
- Province: Kerman
- County: Sirjan
- Bakhsh: Central
- Rural District: Balvard

Population (2006)
  - Total: 92
- Time zone: UTC+3:30 (IRST)
  - Summer (DST): UTC+4:30 (IRDT)

Bash Abdan (Persian: باش ابدان, also Romanized as Bāsh Ābdān, Bāshābdān, and Bāshābadān; also known as Bāshādān) is a village in Balvard Rural District, in the Central District of Sirjan County, Kerman Province, Iran. At the 2006 census, its population was 92, in 20 families.
