= Zamzerj =

Zamzerj زمزرج
- Village
- Location within Iran
- Coordinates: 29°22′12″N 56°08′09″E
- Country: Iran
- Province: Kerman
- County: Sirjan
- Bakhsh: Central
- Rural District: Balvard

Population (2006)
  - Total: 102
- Time zone: UTC+3:30 (IRST)
  - Summer (DST): UTC+4:30 (IRDT)

Zamzerj (Persian: زمزرج, also Romanized as Zamzarj; also known as Zamzerch) is a village in Balvard Rural District, in the Central District of Sirjan County, Kerman Province, Iran. At the 2006 census, its population was 102, in 27 families.
