= Emadabad =

Emadabad (Persian: عماداباد) may refer to:

- Emadabad, Marvdasht, Fars Province
- Emadabad, Kerman
- Emadabad, Anbarabad, Kerman Province
