= Chah Qoli Di-ye Yek =

Chah Qoli Di-ye Yek چاه قليدي1
- Village
- Location within Iran
- Coordinates: 28°53′48″N 55°17′59″E
- Country: Iran
- Province: Kerman
- County: Sirjan
- Bakhsh: Central
- Rural District: Golestan

Population (2006)
  - Total: 23
- Time zone: UTC+3:30 (IRST)
  - Summer (DST): UTC+4:30 (IRDT)

Chah Qoli Di-ye Yek (Persian: چاه قليدي1, also Romanized as Chāh Qolī Dī-ye Yek; also known as Chāh Qolī Dī) is a village in Golestan Rural District, in the Central District of Sirjan County, Kerman Province, Iran. At the 2006 census, its population was 23, in 7 families.
