= Rah Niz =

Rah Niz راه نيز
- Village
- Location within Iran
- Coordinates: 29°17′29″N 56°07′25″E
- Country: Iran
- Province: Kerman
- County: Sirjan
- Bakhsh: Central
- Rural District: Balvard

Population (2006)
  - Total: 55
- Time zone: UTC+3:30 (IRST)
  - Summer (DST): UTC+4:30 (IRDT)

Rah Niz (Persian: راه نيز, also Romanized as Rāh Nīz; also known as Rānīz) is a village in Balvard Rural District, in the Central District of Sirjan County, Kerman Province, Iran. At the 2006 census, its population was 55, in 11 families.
