= Chah Mazra =

Chah Mazra چاه مزراع
- Village
- Location within Iran
- Coordinates: 29°25′52″N 55°15′03″E
- Country: Iran
- Province: Kerman
- County: Sirjan
- Bakhsh: Central
- Rural District: Sharifabad

Population (2006)
  - Total: 124
- Time zone: UTC+3:30 (IRST)
  - Summer (DST): UTC+4:30 (IRDT)

Chah Mazra (Persian: چاه مزراع, also Romanized as Chāh Mazrā‘) is a village in Sharifabad Rural District, in the Central District of Sirjan County, Kerman Province, Iran. At the 2006 census, its population was 124, in 31 families.
