= Estur =

Estur اسطور
- Village
- Location within Iran
- Coordinates: 29°20′52″N 56°08′22″E
- Country: Iran
- Province: Kerman
- County: Sirjan
- Bakhsh: Central
- Rural District: Balvard

Population (2006)
  - Total: 348
- Time zone: UTC+3:30 (IRST)
  - Summer (DST): UTC+4:30 (IRDT)

Estur (Persian: اسطور, also Romanized as Esţūr and Estūr; also known as Istor, Īstowr, and Osţūr) is a village in Balvard Rural District, in the Central District of Sirjan County, Kerman Province, Iran. At the 2006 census, its population was 348, in 81 families.
