= Darababad =

Darababad دراب اباد
- Village
- Location within Iran
- Coordinates: 29°36′57″N 55°27′36″E
- Country: Iran
- Province: Kerman
- County: Sirjan
- Bakhsh: Central
- Rural District: Zeydabad

Population (2006)
  - Total: 110
- Time zone: UTC+3:30 (IRST)
  - Summer (DST): UTC+4:30 (IRDT)

Darababad (Persian: دراب اباد, also Romanized as Dārābābād) is a village in Zeydabad Rural District, in the Central District of Sirjan County, Kerman Province, Iran. At the 2006 census, its population was 110, in 29 families.
