= Ashayir-e Afrashteh =

Ashayir-e Afrashteh عشايرافراشته
- Village
- Country: Iran
- Province: Kerman
- County: Sirjan
- Bakhsh: Central
- Rural District: Najafabad

Population (2006)
  - Total: 47
- Time zone: UTC+3:30 (IRST)
  - Summer (DST): UTC+4:30 (IRDT)

Ashayir-e Afrashteh (Persian: عشايرافراشته, also Romanized as ʿAshāyīr-e Āfrāshteh) is a village in Najafabad Rural District, in the Central District of Sirjan County, Kerman Province, Iran. At the 2006 census, its population was 47, in 11 families.
