= Qotbiyeh =

Qotbiyeh قطبيه
- Village
- Location within Iran
- Coordinates: 29°23′00″N 55°46′00″E
- Country: Iran
- Province: Kerman
- County: Sirjan
- Bakhsh: Central
- Rural District: Najafabad

Population (2006)
  - Total: 16
- Time zone: UTC+3:30 (IRST)
  - Summer (DST): UTC+4:30 (IRDT)

Qotbiyeh (Persian: قطبيه, also Romanized as Qoţbīyeh; also known as Qoţbīyeh-ye Aḩshām) is a village in Najafabad Rural District, in the Central District of Sirjan County, Kerman Province, Iran. At the 2006 census, its population was 16, in 4 families.
