= Qanat Tir =

Qanat Tir قنات تير
- Village
- Location within Iran
- Coordinates: 29°43′12″N 56°20′55″E
- Country: Iran
- Province: Kerman
- County: Sirjan
- Bakhsh: Central
- Rural District: Chahar Gonbad

Population (2006)
  - Total: 27
- Time zone: UTC+3:30 (IRST)
  - Summer (DST): UTC+4:30 (IRDT)

Qanat Tir (Persian: قنات تير, also Romanized as Qanāt Tīr; also known as Qanāt-e ‘Olyā) is a village in Chahar Gonbad Rural District, in the Central District of Sirjan County, Kerman Province, Iran. At the 2006 census, its population was 27, in 6 families.
