= Chah Piruzi =

Chah Piruzi چاه پيروزئ
- Village
- Country: Iran
- Province: Kerman
- County: Sirjan
- Bakhsh: Central
- Rural District: Golestan

Population (2006)
  - Total: 30
- Time zone: UTC+3:30 (IRST)
  - Summer (DST): UTC+4:30 (IRDT)

Chah Piruzi (Persian: چاه پيروزئ, also Romanized as Chāh Pīrūzi) is a village in Golestan Rural District, in the Central District of Sirjan County, Kerman Province, Iran. At the 2006 census, its population was 30, in 10 families.
