= Chah Nareh Cha Abbasi =

Chah Nareh Cha Abbasi چاه نره چاعباسي
- Village
- Country: Iran
- Province: Kerman
- County: Sirjan
- Bakhsh: Central
- Rural District: Sharifabad

Population (2006)
  - Total: 62
- Time zone: UTC+3:30 (IRST)
  - Summer (DST): UTC+4:30 (IRDT)

Chah Nareh Cha Abbasi (Persian: چاه نره چاعباسي, also Romanized as Chāh Nareh Chā ʿAbbāsī) is a village in Sharifabad Rural District, in the Central District of Sirjan County, Kerman Province, Iran. At the 2006 census, its population was 62, in 13 families.
