= Chah Khargushi =

Chah Khargushi چاه خرگوشي
- Village
- Location within Iran
- Coordinates: 28°57′22″N 55°11′40″E
- Country: Iran
- Province: Kerman
- County: Sirjan
- Bakhsh: Central
- Rural District: Sharifabad

Population (2006)
  - Total: 66
- Time zone: UTC+3:30 (IRST)
  - Summer (DST): UTC+4:30 (IRDT)

Chah Khargushi (Persian: چاه خرگوشي, also Romanized as Chāh Khargūshī) is a village in Sharifabad Rural District, in the Central District of Sirjan County, Kerman Province, Iran. At the 2006 census, its population was 66, in 15 families.
