= Shahid Shahmoradi Community =

Shahid Shahmoradi Community گروه مشاع شهيدشاهمرادي
- Village
- Country: Iran
- Province: Kerman
- County: Sirjan
- Bakhsh: Central
- Rural District: Sharifabad

Population (2006)
  - Total: 29
- Time zone: UTC+3:30 (IRST)
  - Summer (DST): UTC+4:30 (IRDT)

Shahid Shahmoradi Community (Persian: گروه مشاع شهيدشاهمرادي – Garveh Mashāʿ-ye Shahīd Shāhmorādī) is a village in Sharifabad Rural District, in the Central District of Sirjan County, Kerman Province, Iran. At the 2006 census, its population was 29, in 5 families.
