= Chah Sangari =

Chah Sangari چاه سنگري
- Village
- Location within Iran
- Coordinates: 28°56′04″N 55°20′36″E
- Country: Iran
- Province: Kerman
- County: Sirjan
- Bakhsh: Central
- Rural District: Golestan

Population (2006)
  - Total: 116
- Time zone: UTC+3:30 (IRST)
  - Summer (DST): UTC+4:30 (IRDT)

Chah Sangari (Persian: چاه سنگري, also Romanized as Chāh Sangarī) is a village in Golestan Rural District, in the Central District of Sirjan County, Kerman Province, Iran. At the 2006 census, its population was 116, in 24 families.
