= Chenaran, Sirjan =

Village in Kerman province, Iran

Chenaran Persian: چناران
- Village
- Location within Iran
- Coordinates: 29°48′40″N 56°01′47″E
- Country: Iran
- Province: Kerman
- County: Sirjan
- District: Balvard
- Rural District: Chahar Gonbad

Population (2016)
  - Total: 283
- Time zone: UTC+3:30 (IRST)

Chenaran (Persian: چناران) is a village in Chahar Gonbad Rural District of Balvard District, Sirjan County, Kerman province, Iran.

== Demographics ==
=== Population ===
At the time of the 2006 National Census, the village's population was below the reporting threshold, when it was in the Central District. The following census in 2011 counted 99 people in 28 households, by which time the rural district had been separated from the district in the formation of Balvard District. The 2016 census measured the population of the village as 283 people in 82 households. It was the most populous village in its rural district.
