= Gudkan-e Yek =

Gudkan-e Yek گودكن 1
- Village
- Country: Iran
- Province: Kerman
- County: Sirjan
- Bakhsh: Central
- Rural District: Chahar Gonbad

Population (2006)
  - Total: 32
- Time zone: UTC+3:30 (IRST)
  - Summer (DST): UTC+4:30 (IRDT)

Gudkan-e Yek (Persian: گودكن 1, also Romanized as Gūdkan-e Yek) is a village in Chahar Gonbad Rural District, in the Central District of Sirjan County, Kerman Province, Iran. At the 2006 census, its population was 32, in 7 families.
