= Chah Quski =

Chah Quski چاه قوسكي
- Village
- Location within Iran
- Coordinates: 29°23′06″N 55°17′37″E
- Country: Iran
- Province: Kerman
- County: Sirjan
- Bakhsh: Central
- Rural District: Sharifabad

Population (2006)
  - Total: 62
- Time zone: UTC+3:30 (IRST)
  - Summer (DST): UTC+4:30 (IRDT)

Chah Quski (Persian: چاه قوسكي, also Romanized as Chāh Qūskī) is a village in Sharifabad Rural District, in the Central District of Sirjan County, Kerman Province, Iran. At the 2006 census, its population was 62, with 18 families.
