= Chah Yusefali =

Chah Yusefali چاه يوسف علي
- Village
- Location within Iran
- Coordinates: 28°44′14″N 55°28′44″E
- Country: Iran
- Province: Kerman
- County: Sirjan
- Bakhsh: Central
- Rural District: Golestan

Population (2006)
  - Total: 54
- Time zone: UTC+3:30 (IRST)
  - Summer (DST): UTC+4:30 (IRDT)

Chah Yusefali (Persian: چاه يوسف علي, also Romanized as Chāh Yūsef‘alī) is a village in Golestan Rural District, in the Central District of Sirjan County, Kerman Province, Iran. At the 2006 census, its population was 54, in 17 families.
