= Ebrahimabad-e Zarduiyeh =

Village in Kerman province, Iran

Ebrahimabad-e Zarduiyeh Persian: ابراهيم اباد زردوئيه
- Village
- Location within Iran
- Coordinates: 29°32′44″N 55°29′27″E
- Country: Iran
- Province: Kerman
- County: Sirjan
- District: Zeydabad
- Rural District: Zeydabad

Population (2016)
  - Total: 649
- Time zone: UTC+3:30 (IRST)

Ebrahimabad-e Zarduiyeh (Persian: ابراهيم ابادزردوئيه) (Note: Also romanized as Ebrāhīmābād-e Zardū’īyeh; also known as Ebrāhīm Zardū and Ebrāhīmābād) is a village in Zeydabad Rural District of Zeydabad District, Sirjan County, Kerman province, Iran.

== Demographics ==
=== Population ===
At the time of the 2006 National Census, the village's population was 185 in 54 households, when it was in the Central District. The following census in 2011 counted 141 people in 40 households, by which time the rural district had been separated from the district in the formation of Zeydabad District. The 2016 census measured the population of the village as 649 people in 191 households. It was the most populous village in its rural district.
