= Kafriz =

Kafriz كفريز
- Village
- Location within Iran
- Coordinates: 29°12′54″N 55°55′50″E
- Country: Iran
- Province: Kerman
- County: Sirjan
- Bakhsh: Central
- Rural District: Malekabad

Population (2006)
  - Total: 573
- Time zone: UTC+3:30 (IRST)
  - Summer (DST): UTC+4:30 (IRDT)

Kafriz (Persian: كفريز, also Romanized as Kafrīz) is a village in Malekabad Rural District, in the Central District of Sirjan County, Kerman Province, Iran. At the 2006 census, its population was 573, in 134 families.
