= Kahn-e Siyah =

Village in Kerman province, Iran

Kahn-e Siyah Persian: كهن سياه
- Village
- Location within Iran
- Coordinates: 29°29′30″N 56°07′50″E
- Country: Iran
- Province: Kerman
- County: Sirjan
- District: Balvard
- Rural District: Balvard

Population (2016)
  - Total: 328
- Time zone: UTC+3:30 (IRST)

Kahn-e Siyah (Persian: كهن سياه) (Note: Also romanized as Kahn-e Sīyāh and Kohansīyāh) is a village in Balvard Rural District of Balvard District, Sirjan County, Kerman province, Iran.

== Demographics ==
=== Population ===
At the time of the 2006 National Census, the village's population was 138 in 33 households, when it was in the Central District. The following census in 2011 counted 218 people in 59 households, by which time the rural district had been separated from the district in the formation of Balvard District. The 2016 census measured the population of the village as 328 people in 97 households. It was the most populous village in its rural district.
