= Darestan, Sirjan =

Village in Kerman province, Iran

Darestan Persian: دارستان
- Village
- Location within Iran
- Coordinates: 29°14′15″N 55°50′36″E
- Country: Iran
- Province: Kerman
- County: Sirjan
- District: Golestan
- Rural District: Malekabad

Population (2016)
  - Total: 1,810
- Time zone: UTC+3:30 (IRST)

Darestan (Persian: دارستان) (Note: Also romanized as Dārestān; also known as Behrastan) is a village in Malekabad Rural District of Golestan District, Sirjan County, Kerman province, Iran.

== Demographics ==
=== Population ===
At the time of the 2006 National Census, the village's population was 1,202 in 293 households, when it was in the Central District. The following census in 2011 counted 1,424 people in 380 households, by which time the rural district had been separated from the district in the formation of Golestan District. The 2016 census measured the population of the village as 1,810 people in 493 households. It was the most populous village in its rural district.
