= Baba Hajji, Kerman =

Baba Hajji باباحاجی
- Village
- Location within Iran
- Coordinates: 29°36′55″N 55°31′58″E
- Country: Iran
- Province: Kerman
- County: Sirjan
- Bakhsh: Central
- Rural District: Zeydabad

Population (2006)
  - Total: 35
- Time zone: UTC+3:30 (IRST)
  - Summer (DST): UTC+4:30 (IRDT)

Baba Hajji (Persian: باباحاجی, also Romanized as Bābā Ḩājjī) is a village in Zeydabad Rural District, in the Central District of Sirjan County, Kerman Province, Iran. At the 2006 census, its population was 35, in 8 families.
