= Eyn ol Baqar =

Eyn ol Baqar عين البقر
- Village
- Location within Iran
- Coordinates: 29°01′00″N 55°20′00″E
- Country: Iran
- Province: Kerman
- County: Sirjan
- Bakhsh: Central
- Rural District: Sharifabad

Population (2006)
  - Total: 132
- Time zone: UTC+3:30 (IRST)
  - Summer (DST): UTC+4:30 (IRDT)

Eyn ol Baqar (Persian: عين البقر, also Romanized as ‘Eyn ol Baqar; also known as Ainubagal, ‘Ain ul Baghal, ‘Eyn ol Baghal, and ‘Eyn ol Baghl) is a village in Sharifabad Rural District, in the Central District of Sirjan County, Kerman Province, Iran. At the 2006 census, its population was 132, in 31 families.
