= Chah Bagh Hasan =

Chah Bagh Hasan چاه باغ حسن
- Village
- Country: Iran
- Province: Kerman
- County: Sirjan
- Bakhsh: Central
- Rural District: Sharifabad

Population (2006)
  - Total: 50
- Time zone: UTC+3:30 (IRST)
  - Summer (DST): UTC+4:30 (IRDT)

Chah Bagh Hasan (Persian: چاه باغ حسن, also Romanized as Chāh Bāgh Ḩasan) is a village in Sharifabad Rural District, in the Central District of Sirjan County, Kerman Province, Iran. At the 2006 census, its population was 50, in 14 families.
