= Chah Pat =

Chah Pat چاه پت
- Village
- Location within Iran
- Coordinates: 29°16′48″N 55°35′57″E
- Country: Iran
- Province: Kerman
- County: Sirjan
- Bakhsh: Central
- Rural District: Najafabad

Population (2006)
  - Total: 91
- Time zone: UTC+3:30 (IRST)
  - Summer (DST): UTC+4:30 (IRDT)

Chah Pat (Persian: چاه پت, also Romanized as Chāh Pat) is a village in Najafabad Rural District, in the Central District of Sirjan County, Kerman Province, Iran. At the 2006 census, its population was 91, in 18 families.
