= Kahn-e Mur, Sirjan =

Kahn-e Mur كهن مور
- Village
- Location within Iran
- Coordinates: 29°16′20″N 56°06′22″E
- Country: Iran
- Province: Kerman
- County: Sirjan
- Bakhsh: Central
- Rural District: Balvard

Population (2006)
  - Total: 65
- Time zone: UTC+3:30 (IRST)
  - Summer (DST): UTC+4:30 (IRDT)

Kahn-e Mur (Persian: كهن مور, also Romanized as Kahn-e Mūr, Kahnemūr, Kahn Mūr, and Kohan Moor; also known as Kanmūr) is a village in Balvard Rural District, in the Central District of Sirjan County, Kerman Province, Iran. At the 2006 census, its population was 65, in 16 families.
