= Deh Mahmud =

Deh Mahmud ده محمود
- Village
- Location within Iran
- Coordinates: 29°48′40″N 56°02′48″E
- Country: Iran
- Province: Kerman
- County: Sirjan
- Bakhsh: Central
- Rural District: Chahar Gonbad

Population (2006)
  - Total: 13
- Time zone: UTC+3:30 (IRST)
  - Summer (DST): UTC+4:30 (IRDT)

Deh Mahmud (Persian: ده محمود, also Romanized as Deh Maḩmūd, Deh-e Maḩmood, and Deh-e Maḩmūd; also known as Deh-e Moḩammad) is a village in Chahar Gonbad Rural District, in the Central District of Sirjan County, Kerman Province, Iran. At the 2006 census, its population was 13, in 4 families.
