= Takyeh, Kerman =

Village in Kerman province, Iran

Takyeh Persian: تكيه
- Village
- Location within Iran
- Coordinates: 29°43′59″N 56°16′23″E
- Country: Iran
- Province: Kerman
- County: Sirjan
- District: Balvard
- Rural District: Chahar Gonbad

Population (2016)
  - Total: 210
- Time zone: UTC+3:30 (IRST)

Takyeh (Persian: تكيه) (Note: Also romanized as Takieh; also known as Takīyeh-e Chahār Gonbad, Takyeh Chahār Gonbad, Takyeh-ye Chahār Gonbad, and Tekyeh Chahār Gonbad) is a village in, and the capital of, Chahar Gonbad Rural District of Balvard District, Sirjan County, Kerman province, Iran.

== Demographics ==
=== Population ===
At the time of the 2006 National Census, the village's population was 199 in 60 households, when it was in the Central District. The following census in 2011 counted 334 people in 100 households, by which time the rural district had been separated from the district in the formation of Balvard District. The 2016 census measured the population of the village as 210 people in 63 households.
