= Pol-e Parvast =

Pol-e Parvast پل پروست
- Village
- Location within Iran
- Coordinates: 29°37′16″N 56°20′43″E
- Country: Iran
- Province: Kerman
- County: Sirjan
- Bakhsh: Central
- Rural District: Chahar Gonbad

Population (2006)
  - Total: 33
- Time zone: UTC+3:30 (IRST)
  - Summer (DST): UTC+4:30 (IRDT)

Pol-e Parvast (Persian: پل پروست) is a village in Chahar Gonbad Rural District, in the Central District of Sirjan County, Kerman Province, Iran. At the 2006 census, its population was 33, in 10 families.
