= Chah Nayi-ye Hazeri =

Chah Nayi-ye Hazeri چاه نائي خضري
- Village
- Country: Iran
- Province: Kerman
- County: Sirjan
- Bakhsh: Central
- Rural District: Golestan

Population (2006)
  - Total: 23
- Time zone: UTC+3:30 (IRST)
  - Summer (DST): UTC+4:30 (IRDT)

Chah Nayi-ye Hazeri (Persian: چاه نائي خضري, also Romanized as Chāh Nāyī-ye Ḩaz̤erī) is a village in Golestan Rural District, in the Central District of Sirjan County, Kerman Province, Iran. At the 2006 census, its population was 23, in 7 families.
