= Mahmudabad-e Seyyed =

Village in Kerman province, Iran

Mahmudabad-e Seyyed Persian: محموداباد سيد
- Village
- Location within Iran
- Coordinates: 29°31′50″N 55°36′39″E
- Country: Iran
- Province: Kerman
- County: Sirjan
- District: Zeydabad
- Rural District: Mahmudabad-e Seyyed

Population (2016)
  - Total: 4,622
- Time zone: UTC+3:30 (IRST)

Mahmudabad-e Seyyed (Persian: محمودابادسيد) (Note: Also romanized as Mahmood Abad Seyyed and Maḩmūdābād-e Seyyed; also known as Maḩmūdābād and Maḩmūdābād-e Sādāt) is a village in, and the capital of, Mahmudabad-e Seyyed Rural District of Zeydabad District, Sirjan County, Kerman province, Iran.

== Demographics ==
=== Population ===
At the time of the 2006 National Census, the village's population was 3,060 in 763 households, when it was in the Central District. The following census in 2011 counted 3,363 people in 954 households, by which time the rural district had been separated from the district in the formation of Zeydabad District. The 2016 census measured the population of the village as 4,622 people in 1,359 households. It was the most populous village in its rural district.
