= Mafan =

Mafan مافان
- Village
- Location within Iran
- Coordinates: 29°40′25″N 56°19′59″E
- Country: Iran
- Province: Kerman
- County: Sirjan
- Bakhsh: Central
- Rural District: Chahar Gonbad

Population (2006)
  - Total: 43
- Time zone: UTC+3:30 (IRST)
  - Summer (DST): UTC+4:30 (IRDT)

Mafan (Persian: مافان, also Romanized as Māfān; also known as Māfūn and Mārfan) is a village in Chahar Gonbad Rural District, in the Central District of Sirjan County, Kerman Province, Iran. At the 2006 census, its population was 43, in 14 families.
