= Sowch-e Pain =

Sowch-e Pain سوچ پايين
- Village
- Location within Iran
- Coordinates: 29°18′41″N 56°15′18″E
- Country: Iran
- Province: Kerman
- County: Sirjan
- Bakhsh: Central
- Rural District: Balvard

Population (2006)
  - Total: 32
- Time zone: UTC+3:30 (IRST)
  - Summer (DST): UTC+4:30 (IRDT)

Sowch-e Pain (Persian: سوچ پايين, also Romanized as Sowch-e Pā’īn; also known as Sowch-e Soflá) is a village in Balvard Rural District, in the Central District of Sirjan County, Kerman Province, Iran. At the 2006 census, its population was 32, in 8 families.
