= Yar Qoli Beyg =

Yar Qoli Beyg يارقلي بيگ
- Village
- Location within Iran
- Coordinates: 29°33′21″N 56°20′38″E
- Country: Iran
- Province: Kerman
- County: Sirjan
- Bakhsh: Central
- Rural District: Chahar Gonbad

Population (2006)
  - Total: 45
- Time zone: UTC+3:30 (IRST)
  - Summer (DST): UTC+4:30 (IRDT)

Yar Qoli Beyg (Persian: يارقلي بيگ, also Romanized as Yār Qolī Beyg; also known as Yārqolī Bak and Yār Qolī Reyg) is a village in Chahar Gonbad Rural District, in the Central District of Sirjan County, Kerman Province, Iran. At the 2006 census, its population was 45, in 13 families.
