= Chah Mord =

Chah Mord چاه مرد
- Village
- Location within Iran
- Coordinates: 28°54′50″N 55°22′08″E
- Country: Iran
- Province: Kerman
- County: Sirjan
- Bakhsh: Central
- Rural District: Golestan

Population (2006)
  - Total: 121
- Time zone: UTC+3:30 (IRST)
  - Summer (DST): UTC+4:30 (IRDT)

Chah Mord (Persian: چاه مرد, also Romanized as Chāh Mord) is a village in Golestan Rural District, in the Central District of Sirjan County, Kerman Province, Iran. At the 2006 census, its population was 121, in 29 families.
