= Chah Nazari =

Chah Nazari چاه نظري
- Village
- Location within Iran
- Coordinates: 28°50′39″N 55°16′47″E
- Country: Iran
- Province: Kerman
- County: Sirjan
- Bakhsh: Central
- Rural District: Golestan

Population (2006)
  - Total: 32
- Time zone: UTC+3:30 (IRST)
  - Summer (DST): UTC+4:30 (IRDT)

Chah Nazari (Persian: چاه نظري, also Romanized as Chāh Naz̧arī) is a village in Golestan Rural District, in the Central District of Sirjan County, Kerman Province, Iran. At the 2006 census, its population was 32, in 9 families.
