= Chah Qaleh =

Chah Qaleh چاه قلعه
- Village
- Location within Iran
- Coordinates: 29°07′54″N 55°44′33″E
- Country: Iran
- Province: Kerman
- County: Sirjan
- Bakhsh: Central
- Rural District: Golestan

Population (2006)
  - Total: 208
- Time zone: UTC+3:30 (IRST)
  - Summer (DST): UTC+4:30 (IRDT)

Chah Qaleh (Persian: چاه قلعه, also Romanized as Chāh Qal‘eh) is a village in Golestan Rural District, in the Central District of Sirjan County, Kerman Province, Iran. At the 2006 census, its population was 208, in 50 families.
