= Basferjan =

Basferjan باسفرجان
- Village
- Location within Iran
- Coordinates: 29°26′41″N 55°38′02″E
- Country: Iran
- Province: Kerman
- County: Sirjan
- Bakhsh: Central
- Rural District: Sharifabad

Population (2006)
  - Total: 1,226
- Time zone: UTC+3:30 (IRST)
  - Summer (DST): UTC+4:30 (IRDT)

Basferjan (Persian: باسفرجان, also Romanized as Bāsferjān; also known as Bāserjān and Bāsfehrjān) is a village in Sharifabad Rural District, in the Central District of Sirjan County, Kerman Province, Iran. At the 2006 census, its population was 1,226, in 279 families.
