= Deh Qotb ol Din =

Deh Qotb ol Din ده قطب الدين
- Village
- Location within Iran
- Coordinates: 29°25′54″N 55°35′24″E
- Country: Iran
- Province: Kerman
- County: Sirjan
- Bakhsh: Central
- Rural District: Sharifabad

Population (2006)
  - Total: 23
- Time zone: UTC+3:30 (IRST)
  - Summer (DST): UTC+4:30 (IRDT)

Deh Qotb ol Din (Persian: ده قطب الدين, also Romanized as Deh Qoṭb ol Dīn and Deh Qoṭb od Dīn; also known as Qoṭb od Dīnbābād) is a village in Sharifabad Rural District, in the Central District of Sirjan County, Kerman Province, Iran. At the 2006 census, its population was 23, in 6 families.
