= Chah Gazamani =

Chah Gazamani چاه گزاماني
- Village
- Country: Iran
- Province: Kerman
- County: Sirjan
- Bakhsh: Central
- Rural District: Golestan

Population (2006)
  - Total: 20
- Time zone: UTC+3:30 (IRST)
  - Summer (DST): UTC+4:30 (IRDT)

Chah Gazamani (Persian: چاه گزاماني, also Romanized as Chāh Gazāmānī) is a village in Golestan Rural District, in the Central District of Sirjan County, Kerman Province, Iran. At the 2006 census, its population was 20, in 8 families.
