= Bagh-e Molla =

Bagh-e Molla or Bagh Molla (Persian: باغ ملا) may refer to:

- Bagh-e Molla, Fars
- Bagh-e Molla, Kerman
- Bagh-e Molla, Khuzestan
