= Sharifabad, Sirjan =

Village in Kerman province, Iran

Sharifabad Persian: شريف اباد
- Village
- Location within Iran
- Coordinates: 29°26′50″N 55°37′25″E
- Country: Iran
- Province: Kerman
- County: Sirjan
- District: Central
- Rural District: Sharifabad

Population (2016)
  - Total: 2,406
- Time zone: UTC+3:30 (IRST)

Sharifabad (Persian: شريف اباد) (Note: Also romanized as Sharīfābād) is a village in, and the capital of, Sharifabad Rural District of the Central District of Sirjan County, Kerman province, Iran.

== Demographics ==
=== Population ===
At the time of the 2006 National Census, the village's population was 1,277 in 302 households. The following census in 2011 counted 1,599 people in 434 households. The 2016 census measured the population of the village as 2,406 people in 669 households.
