= Chah Mish =

Chah Mish (Persian: چاه ميش) may refer to:

- Chah Mish, Fars, Iran; a village
- Chah Mish, Kerman, Iran; a village
