= Molla Hajji, Kerman =

Molla Hajji ملاحاجي
- Village
- Location within Iran
- Coordinates: 29°32′19″N 55°28′23″E
- Country: Iran
- Province: Kerman
- County: Sirjan
- Bakhsh: Central
- Rural District: Zeydabad

Population (2006)
  - Total: 82
- Time zone: UTC+3:30 (IRST)
  - Summer (DST): UTC+4:30 (IRDT)

Molla Hajji (Persian: ملاحاجي, also Romanized as Mollā Ḩājjī) is a village in Zeydabad Rural District, in the Central District of Sirjan County, Kerman Province, Iran. At the 2006 census, its population was 82, in 27 families.
