= Dasht-e Zar, Sirjan =

Dasht-e Zar دشت زر
- Village
- Location within Iran
- Coordinates: 28°55′09″N 55°54′05″E
- Country: Iran
- Province: Kerman
- County: Sirjan
- Bakhsh: Central
- Rural District: Golestan

Population (2006)
  - Total: 108
- Time zone: UTC+3:30 (IRST)
  - Summer (DST): UTC+4:30 (IRDT)

Dasht-e Zar (Persian: دشت زر, also Romanized as Dashtzar) is a village in Golestan Rural District, in the Central District of Sirjan County, Kerman Province, Iran. At the 2006 census, its population was 108, in 30 families.
