= Dasht-e Zar =

Dasht-e Zar or Dashtzar (Persian: دشت زر) may refer to:

- Dasht-e Zar, Sirjan, Kerman Province
- Dasht-e Zar, Sistan and Baluchestan
