= Chah Haftad Tumani-ye Do =

Chah Haftad Tumani-ye Do چاه هفتادتوماني 2
- Village
- Location within Iran
- Coordinates: 28°48′13″N 55°24′43″E
- Country: Iran
- Province: Kerman
- County: Sirjan
- Bakhsh: Central
- Rural District: Golestan

Population (2006)
  - Total: 42
- Time zone: UTC+3:30 (IRST)
  - Summer (DST): UTC+4:30 (IRDT)

Chah Haftad Tumani-ye Do (Persian: چاه هفتادتوماني 2, also Romanized as Chāh Haftād Tūmānī-ye Do; also known as Ḩājj ʿAbbās Shohāb Dāyīn (Persian: حاج عباس شهابداين); also known as Chāh Haftād Tūmānī) is a village in Golestan Rural District, in the Central District of Sirjan County, Kerman Province, Iran. At the 2006 census, its population was 42, in 10 families.
