= Izadabad =

Izadabad (Persian: ايزداباد) may refer to:

- Izadabad, Anbarabad, Kerman Province
- Izadabad, Malekabad, Sirjan County, Kerman Province
- Izadabad, Khoy, West Azerbaijan Province
