= Ezzatabad, Kerman =

Village in Kerman province, Iran

Ezzatabad Persian: عزتاباد
- Village
- Location within Iran
- Coordinates: 29°22′32″N 55°47′04″E
- Country: Iran
- Province: Kerman
- County: Sirjan
- District: Central
- Rural District: Najafabad

Population (2016)
  - Total: 2,085
- Time zone: UTC+3:30 (IRST)

Ezzatabad (Persian: عزتاباد) (Note: Also romanized as ‘Ezzatābād) is a village in Najafabad Rural District of the Central District of Sirjan County, Kerman province, Iran.

== Demographics ==
=== Population ===
At the time of the 2006 National Census, the village's population was 1,677 in 401 households. The following census in 2011 counted 2,060 people in 547 households. The 2016 census measured the population of the village as 2,085 people in 598 households. It was the most populous village in its rural district.
