= Farizan =

Farizan (Persian: فريزن) may refer to:

- Farizan-e Olya
- Farizan-e Sofla
