= Tanguiyeh =

Tanguiyeh تنگوييه
- Village
- Location within Iran
- Coordinates: 29°40′08″N 56°06′23″E
- Country: Iran
- Province: Kerman
- County: Sirjan
- Bakhsh: Central
- Rural District: Chahar Gonbad

Population (2006)
  - Total: 19
- Time zone: UTC+3:30 (IRST)
  - Summer (DST): UTC+4:30 (IRDT)

Tanguiyeh (Persian: تنگوييه, also Romanized as Tangū’īyeh and Tangoo’yeh; also known as Tangū and Tangūyeh) is a village in Chahar Gonbad Rural District, in the Central District of Sirjan County, Kerman Province, Iran. At the 2006 census, its population was 19, in 6 families.
