= Farizan-e Olya =

Farizan-e Olya فريزن عليا
- Village
- Location within Iran
- Coordinates: 29°42′16″N 56°17′23″E
- Country: Iran
- Province: Kerman
- County: Sirjan
- Bakhsh: Central
- Rural District: Chahar Gonbad

Population (2006)
  - Total: 37
- Time zone: UTC+3:30 (IRST)
  - Summer (DST): UTC+4:30 (IRDT)

Farizan-e Olya (Persian: فريزن عليا, also Romanized as Farīzan-e ‘Olyā) is a village in Chahar Gonbad Rural District, in the Central District of Sirjan County, Kerman Province, Iran. At the 2006 census, its population was 37, in 7 families.
