= Borjabad, Iran =

Borjabad (Persian: برج اباد) may refer to:

- Borjabad, Kerman
- Borjabad, Razavi Khorasan
