= Kohanshahr-e Olya =

Kohanshahr-e Olya كهن شهرعليا
- Village
- Location within Iran
- Coordinates: 29°24′00″N 55°53′02″E
- Country: Iran
- Province: Kerman
- County: Sirjan
- Bakhsh: Central
- Rural District: Najafabad

Population (2006)
  - Total: 435
- Time zone: UTC+3:30 (IRST)
  - Summer (DST): UTC+4:30 (IRDT)

Kohanshahr-e Olya (Persian: كهن شهرعليا, also Romanized as Kohanshahr-e ‘Olyā) is a village in Najafabad Rural District, in the Central District of Sirjan County, Kerman Province, Iran. At the 2006 census, its population was 435, in 108 families.
