= Kohanshahr =

Kohanshahr (Persian: كهن شهر) may refer to:

- Kohanshahr-e Olya
- Kohanshahr-e Sofla
