= Farizan-e Sofla =

Farizan-e Sofla فريزن سفلي
- Village
- Location within Iran
- Coordinates: 29°41′51″N 56°16′35″E
- Country: Iran
- Province: Kerman
- County: Sirjan
- Bakhsh: Central
- Rural District: Chahar Gonbad

Population (2006)
  - Total: 130
- Time zone: UTC+3:30 (IRST)
  - Summer (DST): UTC+4:30 (IRDT)

Farizan-e Sofla (Persian: فريزن سفلي, also Romanized as Farīzan-e Soflá) is a village in Chahar Gonbad Rural District, in the Central District of Sirjan County, Kerman Province, Iran. At the 2006 census, its population was 130, in 32 families.
