= Emadabad, Kerman =

Emadabad عماداباد
- Village
- Location within Iran
- Coordinates: 29°31′10″N 55°32′50″E
- Country: Iran
- Province: Kerman
- County: Sirjan
- Bakhsh: Central
- Rural District: Mahmudabad-e Seyyed

Population (2006)
  - Total: 702
- Time zone: UTC+3:30 (IRST)
  - Summer (DST): UTC+4:30 (IRDT)

Emadabad (Persian: عماداباد, also Romanized as ‘Emādābād) is a village in Mahmudabad-e Seyyed Rural District, in the Central District of Sirjan County, Kerman Province, Iran. At the 2006 census, its population was 702, in 166 families.
