= Hojjatabad, Sharifabad =

Village in Kerman province, Iran

Hojjatabad حجت‌آباد
- Village
- Location within Iran
- Coordinates: 29°26′01″N 55°37′31″E
- Country: Iran
- Province: Kerman
- County: Sirjan
- District: Central
- Rural District: Sharifabad

Population (2016)
  - Total: 3,350
- Time zone: UTC+3:30 (IRST)

Hojjatabad (Persian: حجت‌آباد) (Note: Also romanized as Ḩojjatābād) is a village in Sharifabad Rural District of the Central District of Sirjan County, Kerman province, Iran.

== Demographics ==
=== Population ===
At the time of the 2006 National Census, the village's population was 1,796 in 443 households. The following census in 2011 counted 2,365 people in 650 households. The 2016 census measured the population of the village as 3,350 people in 946 households. It was the most populous village in its rural district.
