= Kohanshahr-e Sofla =

Kohanshahr-e Sofla كهن شهرسفلي
- Village
- Location within Iran
- Coordinates: 29°23′50″N 55°50′48″E
- Country: Iran
- Province: Kerman
- County: Sirjan
- Bakhsh: Central
- Rural District: Najafabad

Population (2006)
  - Total: 108
- Time zone: UTC+3:30 (IRST)
  - Summer (DST): UTC+4:30 (IRDT)

Kohanshahr-e Sofla (Persian: كهن شهرسفلي, also Romanized as Kohanshahr-e Soflá) is a village in Najafabad Rural District, in the Central District of Sirjan County, Kerman Province, Iran. At the 2006 census, its population was 108, in 24 families.
