= Molla Hajji =

Molla Hajji (Persian: ملاحاجي) may refer to:

- Molla Hajji, East Azerbaijan
- Molla Hajji, Kerman
