= Darpa, Iran =

Darpa دارپا
- Village
- Country: Iran
- Province: Kerman
- County: Sirjan
- Bakhsh: Central
- Rural District: Chahar Gonbad

Population (2006)
  - Total: 62
- Time zone: UTC+3:30 (IRST)
  - Summer (DST): UTC+4:30 (IRDT)

Darpa (Persian: دارپا, also Romanized as Dārpā) is a village in Chahar Gonbad Rural District, in the Central District of Sirjan County, Kerman Province, Iran. At the 2006 census, its population was 62, in 11 families.
