= Mount Qaruneh =

Mountain in Isfahan Province, Iran

Mount Qaruneh or Kuh-e Qaruneh is a mountain which is located about 30 kilometres southeast of the city of Isfahan in Isfahan Province in Iran. Situated southeast of Mount Shah Kuh and being almost parallel to Mount Kolah Qazi this mountain has an average width of about 2 kilometres and a length of around 25 kilometres. Mount Qaruneh has a general northwest southeast direction. With an elevation of 2030 metres, the highest peak is located in the southern section of the mountain. Mount Qaruneh is situated in the Sanandaj-Sirjan geologic and structural zone of Iran and is made mainly of Lower Cretaceous limestone.
