= Khvaju Shahr =

City in Kerman province, Iran

Khvaju Shahr Persian: خواجو شهر
- City
- Location within Iran
- Coordinates: 29°16′19″N 55°49′56″E
- Country: Iran
- Province: Kerman
- County: Sirjan
- District: Golestan

Population (2016)
  - Total: 2,478
- Time zone: UTC+3:30 (IRST)

Khvaju Shahr (Persian: خواجو شهر) (Note: Formerly the village of Malekabad (ملك اباد), also romanized as Malakābād and Malekābād; also known as Malikābād) is a city in, and the capital of, Golestan District of Sirjan County, Kerman province, Iran. It also serves as the administrative center for Malekabad Rural District.

== Demographics ==
=== Population ===
At the time of the 2006 National Census, the population was 1,370 in 336 households, when it was the village of Malekabad in Malekabad Rural District of the Central District. The following census in 2011 counted 1,507 people in 442 households, by which time the rural district had been separated from the district in the formation of Golestan District. The 2016 census measured the population as 2,478 people in 777 households, when Malekabad had been elevated to city status as Khvaju Shahr.
