= DARPA (disambiguation) =

DARPA, the Defense Advanced Research Projects Agency, is a research agency of the US Government.

DARPA may also refer to:

- DARPA Quantum Network, the first quantum key distribution network
- DARPANET, a.k.a. ARPANET, the first operational packet switching network of a set that came to compose the global Internet
- DARPA Agent Markup Language, focused on the creation of machine-readable representations for the Web
- DARPA Falcon Project
- DARPA Grand Challenge, a prize competition for driverless vehicles
  - DARPA Grand Challenge (2007), third driverless car competition
- DARPA Network Challenge, a prize competition for exploring the roles the Internet and social networking play in the real-time communications
- DARPA Silent Talk, a.k.a. Brain–computer interface, a direct communication pathway between the brain and an external device
- Darpa, Iran, a village in Kerman Province, Iran
- Darpa (butterfly), a genus of skipper butterfly

== See also ==
- Delaware River Port Authority (DRPA)
