= Izadabad, Malekabad =

Izadabad ايزداباد
- Village
- Location within Iran
- Coordinates: 29°18′16″N 55°49′32″E
- Country: Iran
- Province: Kerman
- County: Sirjan
- Bakhsh: Central
- Rural District: Malekabad

Population (2006)
  - Total: 1,054
- Time zone: UTC+3:30 (IRST)
  - Summer (DST): UTC+4:30 (IRDT)

Izadabad (Persian: ايزداباد, also Romanized as Īzadābād; also known as Yazdābād) is a village in Malekabad Rural District, in the Central District of Sirjan County, Kerman Province, Iran. At the 2006 census, its population was 1,054, in 250 families.
