= Mount Kolah Qazi =

Mountain in Iran

Mount Kolah Qazi or Kuh-e Kolah Qazi is a mountain that is located about 30 kilometres (20 mi) southeast of the city of Isfahan in Isfahan province in Iran. With an elevation of 2,534 metres (8,314 ft), the highest peak is in the north-central part of the mountain. Having a general northwest–southeast direction, the mountain is situated southeast of Mount Shah Kuh and west and almost parallel to Mount Qaruneh. With an average width of about 5 km (3 mi) and a length of almost 20 km (12 mi), the mountain is a part of the Mount Kolah Qazi Protected Nature Reserve which covers an area of about 50,000 hectares (120,000 acres) of national park and 3,000 ha (7,400 acres) hectares of protected wildlife region.

== Etymology ==
In Persian ‘'kolah'’ means ‘'cap'’ or ‘'headdress'’ and ‘'qazi'’ means ‘'judge'’, so ‘'kolah qazi'’ or ‘'kolah-e qazi'’ means ‘'cap or headdress of a judge'’.

== Geology ==
Mount Kolah Qazi is located in Sanandaj-Sirjan geologic and structural zone of Iran and it is mainly made of Lower Cretaceous limestone. Only a very small part of the central and southern section of the mountain is formed by Upper Jurassic granodiorite.
