= Tangu =

Tangu may refer to:

- Tanggu District, China
- Tangu, Iran, a village in Kerman Province, Iran
