= Balvard =

City in Kerman province, Iran

Balvard Persian: بَلورد
- City
- Interactive map of Balvard
- Location within Iran
- Coordinates: 29°25′11″N 56°02′55″E
- Country: Iran
- Province: Kerman
- County: Sirjan
- District: Balvard
- Elevation: 2,034 m (6,673 ft)

Population (2016)
  - Total: 3,534
- Time zone: UTC+3:30 (IRST)
- Postal code: 78331
- Area code: 2927
- Website: balvardcity.ir

Balvard (Persian: بلورد) (Note: Also known as Balvareh) is a city in Kerman province, Iran. It also serves as the administrative center for Balvard Rural District. This city is located on Road 88.

== Demographics ==
=== Population ===
At the time of the 2006 National Census, Balvard's population was 3,173 in 692 households, when it was a village in Balvard Rural District of the Central District. The following census in 2011 counted 3,488 people in 922 households, by which time the rural district had been separated from the district in the formation of Balvard District. The 2016 census measured the population as 3,534 people in 1,109 households, when the village had been elevated to the status of a city.
