= Yazdabad =

Yazdabad or Yezdabad (Persian: يزداباد) may refer to:

- Yazdabad, Isfahan
- Yazdabad, Falavarjan, Isfahan Province
- Yazdabad, Kashan, Isfahan Province
- Yazdabad, Kerman
