= Chah Haftad Tumani =

Chah Haftad Tumani (Persian: چاه هفتادتوماني) may refer to:

- Chah Haftad Tumani-ye Yek
- Chah Haftad Tumani-ye Do
