= Sang Castle =

Castle in Kerman province, Iran

- قلعه سنگ
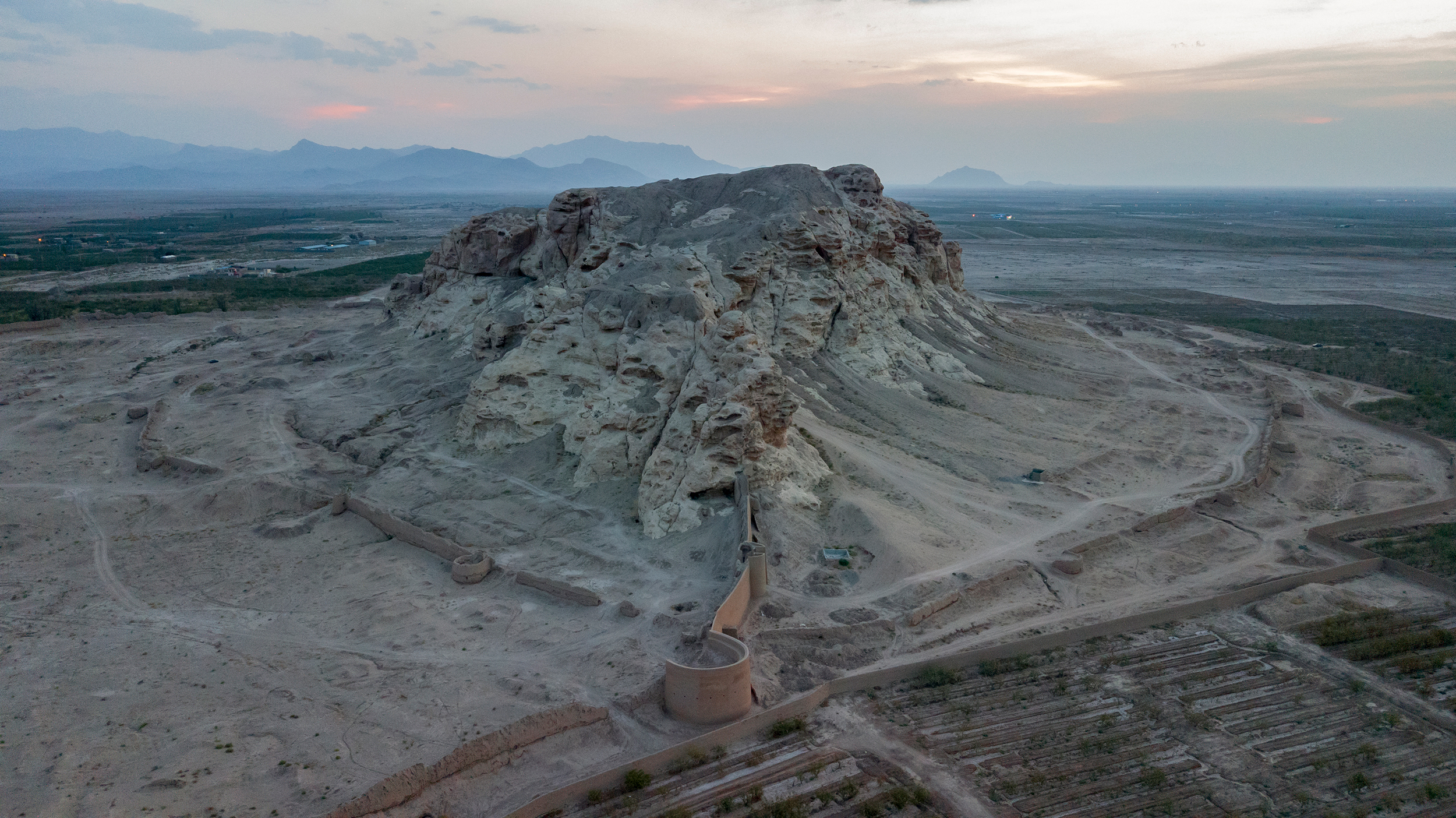

General information
- Type: Castle
- Location: Sirjan County, Iran

Iran National Heritage List
- Official name: Sang Castle
- Type: Mound
- Designated: 1931
- Reference no.: 53
- Conservation organization: Cultural Heritage, Handicrafts and Tourism Organization of Iran

Sang Castle (Persian: قلعه سنگ) is a historic castle located in Sirjan County, Kerman province, Iran. The castle dates back to the Sasanian Empire.
