= Zeydabad =

City in Kerman province, Iran

Zeydabad Persian: زيدآباد
- City
- Location within Iran
- Coordinates: 29°36′03″N 55°32′12″E
- Country: Iran
- Province: Kerman
- County: Sirjan
- District: Zeydabad

Population (2016)
  - Total: 9,112
- Time zone: UTC+3:30 (IRST)

Zeydabad (Persian: زيدآباد) (Note: Also romanized as Zaidābād, Zeid Abad, and Zeydābād) is a city in, and the capital of, Zeydabad District of Sirjan County, Kerman province, Iran. It also serves as the administrative center for Zeydabad Rural District.

== Demographics ==
=== Population ===
At the time of the 2006 National Census, the city's population was 5,314 in 1,283 households, when it was in the Central District. The following census in 2011 counted 5,260 people in 1,402 households, by which time two rural districts had been separated from the district in the formation of Zeydabad District. The 2016 census measured the population of the city as 9,112 people in 2,335 households, when the city had been transferred to the district.
