= Mount Shah Kuh =

Mountain in Iran

Shah Kuh (Persian: شاه کوه, lit. 'Mount King') is a mountain located about 15 kilometres south of the city of Isfahan in Isfahan province, Iran. With an average width of about 3 kilometres and a length of almost 20 kilometres, this mountain has a general northwest–southeast direction and is situated almost northwest of Mount Kolah Qazi.

The highest peak is located in the northern section of the mountain and has an elevation of 2418 metres. Mount Shah Kuh is situated in the Sanandaj-Sirjan geologic and structural zone of Iran, and except for a very small section of Jurassic rocks in its north-central part this mountain is mainly formed of Lower Cretaceous limestone.
