= Najafshahr =

City in Kerman province, Iran

Najafshahr Persian: نجف‌شهر
- City
- Location within Iran
- Coordinates: 29°23′23″N 55°43′13″E
- Country: Iran
- Province: Kerman
- County: Sirjan
- District: Central

Population (2016)
  - Total: 20,164
- Time zone: UTC+3:30 (IRST)

Najafshahr (Persian: نجف‌شهر) (Note: Formerly the village of Najafabad, also romanized as Najafābād and Nejafābād) is a city in the Central District of Sirjan County, Kerman province, Iran, serving as the administrative center for Najafabad Rural District.

== History ==
The village of Najafabad was elevated to city status as Najafshahr in 1997.

== Demographics ==
=== Population ===
At the time of the 2006 National Census, the city's population was 6,768 in 1,606 households. The following census in 2011 counted 9,448 people in 2,535 households. The 2016 census measured the population of the city as 20,164 people in 5,894 households.
