= Mohammadiyeh-e Olya =

Mohammadiyeh-e Olya محمديه عليا
- Village
- Location within Iran
- Coordinates: 34°08′06″N 48°19′36″E
- Country: Iran
- Province: Hamadan
- County: Nahavand
- Bakhsh: Central
- Rural District: Shaban

Population (2006)
  - Total: 129
- Time zone: UTC+3:30 (IRST)
  - Summer (DST): UTC+4:30 (IRDT)

Mohammadiyeh-e Olya (Persian: محمديه عليا, also Romanized as Moḩammadīyeh-e ‘Olyā; also known as Moḩammad Gap ‘Olyā and Moḩammad Kap) is a village in Shaban Rural District, in the Central District of Nahavand County, Hamadan Province, Iran. At the 2006 census, its population was 129, in 37 families.
