= Dasht-e Zar, Sistan and Baluchestan =

Dasht-e Zar دشتزار
- Village
- Location within Iran
- Coordinates: 28°30′00″N 61°30′00″E
- Country: Iran
- Province: Sistan and Baluchestan
- County: Khash
- Bakhsh: Central
- Rural District: Poshtkuh

Population (2006)
  - Total: 44
- Time zone: UTC+3:30 (IRST)
  - Summer (DST): UTC+4:30 (IRDT)

Dasht-e Zar (Persian: دشتزار, also Romanized as Dasht-e Zār) is a village in Poshtkuh Rural District, in the Central District of Khash County, Sistan and Baluchestan Province, Iran. At the 2006 census, its population was 44, in 7 families.
