= Chah Mish, Fars =

Chah Mish چاه ميش
- Village
- Location within Iran
- Coordinates: 28°33′12″N 55°16′57″E
- Country: Iran
- Province: Fars
- County: Darab
- Bakhsh: Rostaq
- Rural District: Kuhestan

Population (2006)
  - Total: 22
- Time zone: UTC+3:30 (IRST)
  - Summer (DST): UTC+4:30 (IRDT)

Chah Mish (Persian: چاه ميش, also Romanized as Chāh Mīsh) is a village in Kuhestan Rural District, Rostaq District, Darab County, Fars province, Iran. At the 2006 census, its population was 22, in 8 families.
