= Izadabad, Anbarabad =

Izadabad ايزداباد
- Village
- Location within Iran
- Coordinates: 28°16′48″N 57°31′38″E
- Country: Iran
- Province: Kerman
- County: Anbarabad
- Bakhsh: Esmaili
- Rural District: Esmaili

Population (2006)
  - Total: 115
- Time zone: UTC+3:30 (IRST)
  - Summer (DST): UTC+4:30 (IRDT)

Izadabad (Persian: ايزداباد, also Romanized as Īzadābād) is a village in Esmaili Rural District, located in Esmaili District of Anbarabad County, Kerman Province, Iran. According to the 2006 census, its population was 115, in 24 families.
