= Mahmudabad-e Seyyed Rural District =

Rural district in Kerman province, Iran

Mahmudabad-e Seyyed Rural District Persian: دهستان محمودآباد سيد
- Rural District
- Location within Iran
- Coordinates: 29°34′08″N 55°35′08″E
- Country: Iran
- Province: Kerman
- County: Sirjan
- District: Zeydabad
- Capital: Mahmudabad-e Seyyed

Population (2016)
  - Total: 12,708
- Time zone: UTC+3:30 (IRST)

Mahmudabad-e Seyyed Rural District (Persian: دهستان محمودآباد سيد) is in Zeydabad District of Sirjan County, Kerman province, Iran. Its capital is the village of Mahmudabad-e Seyyed.

== Demographics ==
=== Population ===
At the time of the 2006 National Census, the rural district's population (as a part of the Central District) was 7,923 in 1,936 households. There were 10,165 inhabitants in 2,655 households at the following census of 2011, by which time the rural district had been separated from the district in the formation of Zeydabad District. The 2016 census measured the population of the rural district as 12,708 in 3,560 households. The most populous of its 37 villages was Mahmudabad-e Seyyed, with 4,622 people.
