= Mohammadiyeh-e Sofla =

Mohammadiyeh-e Sofla محمديه سفلي
- Village
- Location within Iran
- Coordinates: 34°08′46″N 48°20′19″E
- Country: Iran
- Province: Hamadan
- County: Nahavand
- Bakhsh: Central
- Rural District: Shaban

Population (2006)
  - Total: 72
- Time zone: UTC+3:30 (IRST)
  - Summer (DST): UTC+4:30 (IRDT)

Mohammadiyeh-e Sofla (Persian: محمديه سفلي, also Romanized as Moḩammadīyeh-e Soflá; also known as Maigaf, Maigāf Pāīn, Mīgof, Moḩammad Gab, Moḩammad Gap-e Pā’īn, Moḩammad Gap-e Soflá, and Mohammad Kab Sofla) is a village in Shaban Rural District, in the Central District of Nahavand County, Hamadan Province, Iran. At the 2006 census, its population was 72, in 17 families.
