= Golestan District (Sirjan County) =

District in Kerman province, Iran

Golestan District Persian: بخش گلستان
- District
- Location within Iran
- Coordinates: 29°01′20″N 55°40′52″E
- Country: Iran
- Province: Kerman
- County: Sirjan
- Capital: Khvaju Shahr

Population (2016)
  - Total: 17,061
- Time zone: UTC+3:30 (IRST)

Golestan District (Persian: بخش گلستان) is in Sirjan County, Kerman province, Iran. Its capital is the city of Khvaju Shahr.

== History ==
After the 2006 National Census, Golestan and Malekabad Rural Districts were separated from the Central District in the formation of Golestan District. After the 2011 census, the village of Malekabad was elevated to city status as Khvaju Shahr.

== Demographics ==
=== Population ===
At the time of the 2011 census, the district's population was 3,818 households. The 2016 census measured the population of the district as 17,061 inhabitants in 5,045 households.

=== Administrative divisions ===
Golestan District Population
Administrative Divisions	2011	2016
Golestan RD	4,695	5,647
Malekabad RD	8,894	8,936
Khvaju Shahr (city) (Note: Formerly the village of Malekabad)		2,478
Total	13,589	17,061
RD = Rural District
