= Mohammadiyeh, Rafsanjan =

Mohammadiyeh محمديه
- Village
- Location within Iran
- Coordinates: 30°27′20″N 56°03′34″E
- Country: Iran
- Province: Kerman
- County: Rafsanjan
- Bakhsh: Central
- Rural District: Qasemabad

Population (2006)
  - Total: 232
- Time zone: UTC+3:30 (IRST)
  - Summer (DST): UTC+4:30 (IRDT)

Mohammadiyeh (Persian: محمديه, also Romanized as Moḩammadīyeh) is a village in Qasemabad Rural District, in the Central District of Rafsanjan County, Kerman Province, Iran. At the 2006 census, its population was 232, in 62 families.
