= Mohammadiyeh, Mashhad =

Mohammadiyeh محمديه
- Village
- Location within Iran
- Coordinates: 36°31′48″N 59°44′55″E
- Country: Iran
- Province: Razavi Khorasan
- County: Mashhad
- Bakhsh: Central
- Rural District: Tabadkan

Population (2006)
  - Total: 62
- Time zone: UTC+3:30 (IRST)
  - Summer (DST): UTC+4:30 (IRDT)

Mohammadiyeh (Persian: محمديه, also Romanized as Moḩammadīyeh) is a village in Tabadkan Rural District, in the Central District of Mashhad County, Razavi Khorasan Province, Iran. At the 2006 census, its population was 62, in 9 families.
