= Bagh-e Molla, Khuzestan =

Bagh-e Molla باغ ملا
- Village
- Location within Iran
- Coordinates: 31°39′55″N 49°47′21″E
- Country: Iran
- Province: Khuzestan
- County: Bagh-e Malek
- Bakhsh: Central
- Rural District: Qaleh Tall

Population (2006)
  - Total: 187
- Time zone: UTC+3:30 (IRST)
  - Summer (DST): UTC+4:30 (IRDT)

Bagh-e Molla (Persian: باغ ملا, also Romanized as Bāgh-e Mollā and Bagh Molla) is a village in Qaleh Tall Rural District, in the Central District of Bagh-e Malek County, Khuzestan Province, Iran. At the 2006 census, its population was 187, in 45 families.
