= Emadabad, Marvdasht =

Emadabad عماداباد
- Village
- Location within Iran
- Coordinates: 29°54′18″N 52°46′12″E
- Country: Iran
- Province: Fars
- County: Marvdasht
- Bakhsh: Central
- Rural District: Rudbal

Population (2006)
  - Total: 1,023
- Time zone: UTC+3:30 (IRST)
  - Summer (DST): UTC+4:30 (IRDT)

Emadabad (Persian: عماداباد, also Romanized as 'Emādābād; also known as Mādowā) is a village in Rudbal Rural District, in the Central District of Marvdasht County, Fars province, Iran. At the 2006 census, its population was 1,023, in 232 families.
