= Bagh-e Molla, Fars =

Bagh-e Molla باغ ملا
- Village
- Location within Iran
- Coordinates: 28°30′53″N 55°23′31″E
- Country: Iran
- Province: Fars
- County: Darab
- Bakhsh: Rostaq
- Rural District: Kuhestan

Population (2006)
  - Total: 96
- Time zone: UTC+3:30 (IRST)
  - Summer (DST): UTC+4:30 (IRDT)

Bagh-e Molla (Persian: باغ ملا, also Romanized as Bāgh-e Mollā) is a village in Kuhestan Rural District, Rostaq District, Darab County, Fars province, Iran. At the 2006 census, its population was 96, in 21 families.
