= Borjabad, Razavi Khorasan =

Borjabad برج اباد
- Village
- Location within Iran
- Coordinates: 36°22′29″N 59°44′32″E
- Country: Iran
- Province: Razavi Khorasan
- County: Mashhad
- Bakhsh: Central
- Rural District: Kenevist

Population (2006)
  - Total: 161
- Time zone: UTC+3:30 (IRST)
  - Summer (DST): UTC+4:30 (IRDT)

Borjabad (Persian: برج اباد, also Romanized as Borjābād) is a village in Kenevist Rural District, in the Central District of Mashhad County, Razavi Khorasan Province, Iran. At the 2006 census, its population was 161, in 42 families.
