= Hojjatabad, Anbarabad =

Hojjatabad حجت‌آباد
- Village
- Location within Iran
- Coordinates: 28°25′55″N 57°51′52″E
- Country: Iran
- Province: Kerman
- County: Anbarabad
- Bakhsh: Central
- Rural District: Aliabad

Population (2006)
  - Total: 695
- Time zone: UTC+3:30 (IRST)
  - Summer (DST): UTC+4:30 (IRDT)

Hojjatabad (Persian: حجت‌آباد, also Romanized as Ḩojjatābād; also known as ‘Emādābād) is a village in Aliabad Rural District, in the Central District of Anbarabad County, Kerman Province, Iran. At the 2006 census, its population was 695, in 156 families.
