= Malekabad Rural District =

Rural district in Kerman province, Iran

Malekabad Rural District Persian: دهستان ملك آباد
- Rural District
- Location within Iran
- Coordinates: 29°16′38″N 55°52′51″E
- Country: Iran
- Province: Kerman
- County: Sirjan
- District: Golestan
- Capital: Khvaju Shahr

Population (2016)
  - Total: 8,936
- Time zone: UTC+3:30 (IRST)

Malekabad Rural District (Persian: دهستان ملك آباد) is in Golestan District of Sirjan County, Kerman province, Iran. It is administered from the city of Khvaju Shahr. (Note: Formerly the village of Malekabad)

== Demographics ==
=== Population ===
At the time of the 2006 National Census, the rural district's population (as a part of the Central District) was 8,381 in 1,968 households. There were 8,894 inhabitants in 2,475 households at the following census of 2011, by which time the rural district had been separated from the district in the formation of Golestan District. The 2016 census measured the population of the rural district as 8,936 in 2,543 households. The most populous of its 76 villages was Darestan, with 1,810 people.
