= Zeydabad District =

District in Kerman province, Iran

Zeydabad District Persian: بخش زیدآباد
- District
- Location within Iran
- Coordinates: 29°38′26″N 55°27′31″E
- Country: Iran
- Province: Kerman
- County: Sirjan
- Capital: Zeydabad

Population (2016)
  - Total: 27,818
- Time zone: UTC+3:30 (IRST)

Zeydabad District (Persian: بخش زیدآباد) is in Sirjan County, Kerman province, Iran. Its capital is the city of Zeydabad.

== History ==
In 2010, Mahmudabad-e Seyyed and Zeydabad Rural Districts were separated from the Central District in the formation of Zeydabad District. After the 2011 census, the city of Zeydabad was transferred from the Central District to Zeydabad District.

== Demographics ==
=== Population ===
At the time of the 2011 National Census, the district's population was 13,424 in 3,598 households. The 2016 census measured the population of the district as 27,818 inhabitants in 7,664 households, by which time the city of Zeydabad had been transferred to the district.

=== Administrative divisions ===
Zeydabad District Population
Administrative Divisions	2011	2016
Mahmudabad-e Seyyed RD	10,165	12,708
Zeydabad RD	3,259	5,998
Zeydabad (city)		9,112
Total	13,424	27,818
RD = Rural District
