= Sirjan =

City in Kerman province, Iran

Sirjan Persian: سیرجان
- City
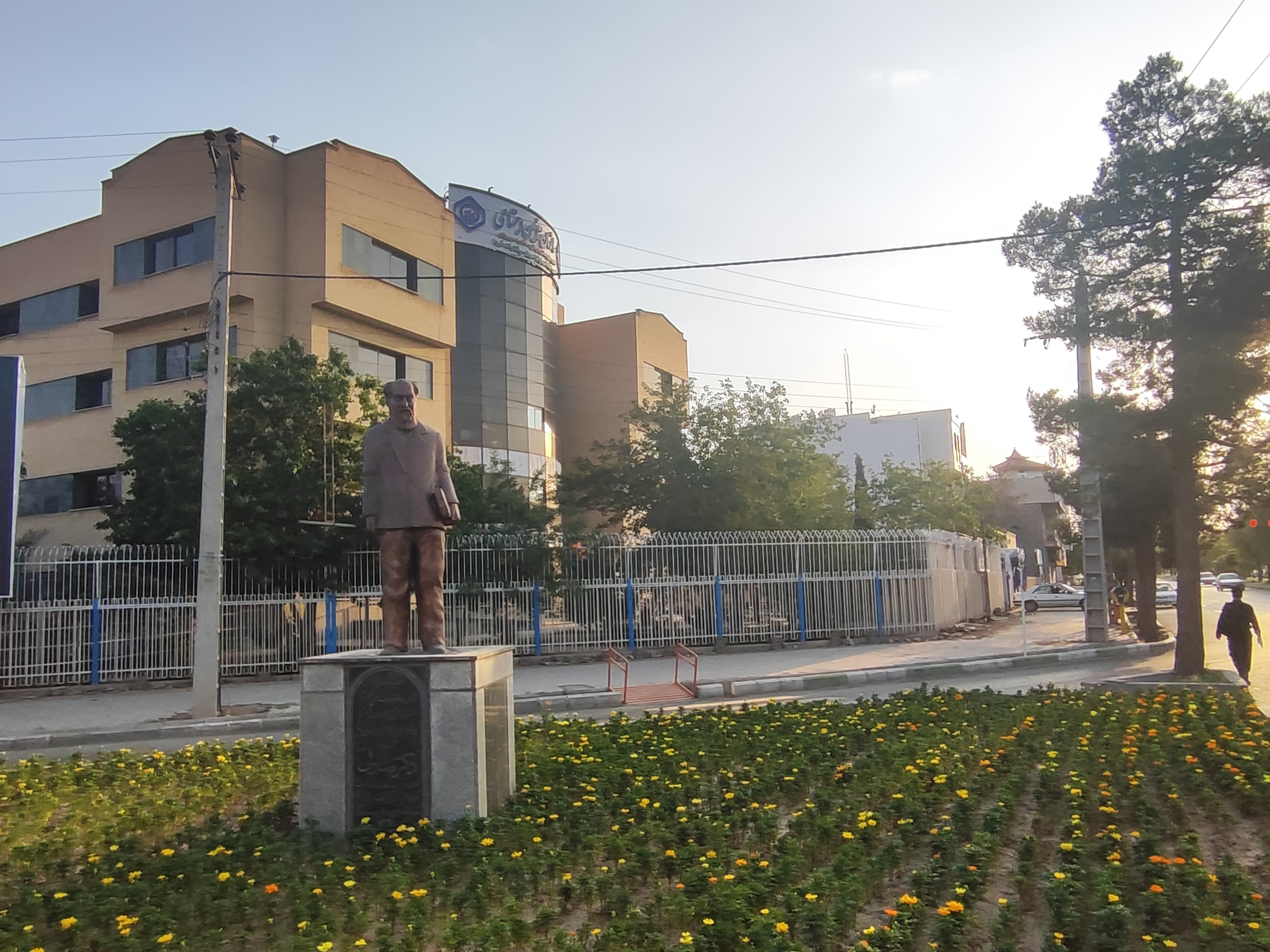

- Location within Iran
- Coordinates: 29°26′31″N 55°41′09″E
- Country: Iran
- Province: Kerman
- County: Sirjan
- District: Central
- Elevation: 1,760 m (5,770 ft)

Population (2016)
  - Total: 199,704
- Time zone: UTC+3:30 (IRST)
- Website: www.sirjan.ir

Sirjan (Persian: سیرجان; [siːɾˈdʒɒːn]) (Note: Also romanized as Sirjân and Sīrjān; formerly Sa‘īdābād) is a city in the Central District of Sirjan County, Kerman province, in southern Iran, serving as capital of both the county and the district. The city is 960 km (600 mi) from the Iranian capital of Tehran, and 175 km (109 mi) from the provincial capital of Kerman. It is known for its pistachios, Kilim, and a windcatcher locally known as Bādgir-e Chopoqi (calumet louver).

== Climate ==
Sirjan has a cold desert climate (BWk) in the Köppen climate classification.

Climate data for Sirjan (elevation: 1,739.4 m (5,707 ft), 1985-2010)
Month	Jan	Feb	Mar	Apr	May	Jun	Jul	Aug	Sep	Oct	Nov	Dec	Year
Record high °C (°F)	21.0 (69.8)	24.6 (76.3)	30.6 (87.1)	33.0 (91.4)	37.0 (98.6)	40.5 (104.9)	42.0 (107.6)	40.4 (104.7)	38.0 (100.4)	32.5 (90.5)	27.0 (80.6)	25.6 (78.1)	42.0 (107.6)
Daily mean °C (°F)	5.6 (42.1)	8.2 (46.8)	12.0 (53.6)	17.0 (62.6)	22.1 (71.8)	26.8 (80.2)	29.0 (84.2)	27.2 (81.0)	23.5 (74.3)	17.8 (64.0)	11.6 (52.9)	7.3 (45.1)	17.3 (63.2)
Record low °C (°F)	−14.0 (6.8)	−13.0 (8.6)	−7.4 (18.7)	0.0 (32.0)	4.6 (40.3)	10.0 (50.0)	11.2 (52.2)	9.6 (49.3)	6.0 (42.8)	−0.6 (30.9)	−8.4 (16.9)	−12.0 (10.4)	−14.0 (6.8)
Average precipitation mm (inches)	29.2 (1.15)	21.1 (0.83)	27.6 (1.09)	11.7 (0.46)	5.2 (0.20)	0.6 (0.02)	1.6 (0.06)	0.5 (0.02)	0.4 (0.02)	2.0 (0.08)	5.9 (0.23)	27.5 (1.08)	133.3 (5.24)
Average snowy days	0.8	0.1	0	0	0	0	0	0	0	0	0	0.2	1.1
Average relative humidity (%)	54	47	43	36	27	22	24	24	25	31	39	51	35
Mean monthly sunshine hours	226.9	225.5	247.7	271.5	331.2	347.0	333.0	339.3	317.3	306.3	250.7	218.9	3,415.3
Source: Iran Meteorological Organization

== Demographics ==
=== Population ===
At the time of the 2006 National Census, the city's population was 167,014 in 40,605 households. The following census in 2011 counted 185,623 people in 51,088 households. The 2016 census measured the population of the city as 199,704 people in 58,756 households.

== Universities and higher education centers ==
=== Payam Noor University Sirjan ===
Source:

=== University of Technology, Sirjan ===
Sirjan University of Technology is a non-profit public higher education institution that was established in 1992. This university, which was established by the Ministry of Science, Research and Technology of Iran, offers courses and programs that lead to obtaining official degrees from higher education. Sirjan University of Technology also provides many university and non-university facilities and services including library and administrative services to students.

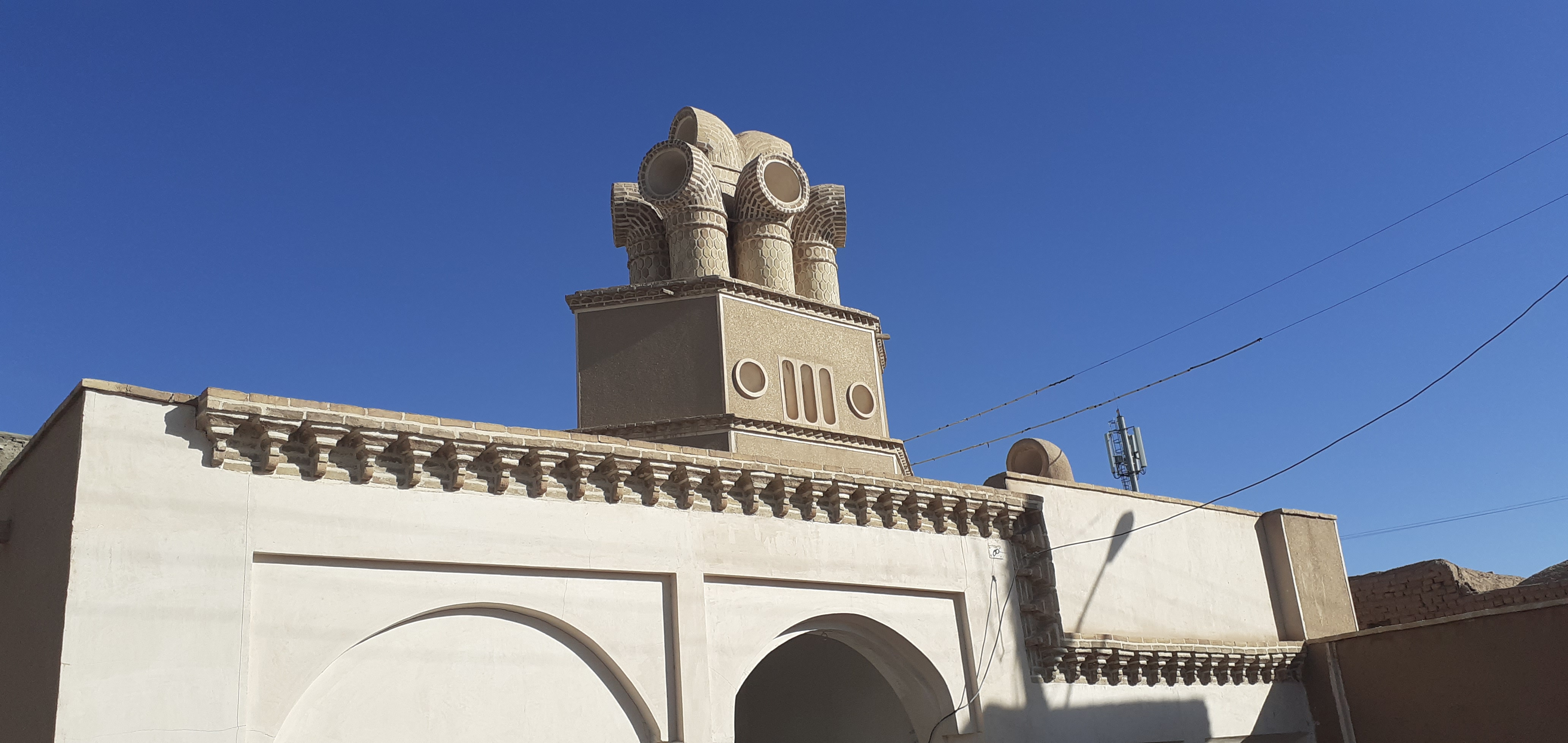
Choboghi wind-catcher (Badgir)

=== Islamic Azad University, Sirjan ===
Source:

=== Chopoqi Windcatcher ===
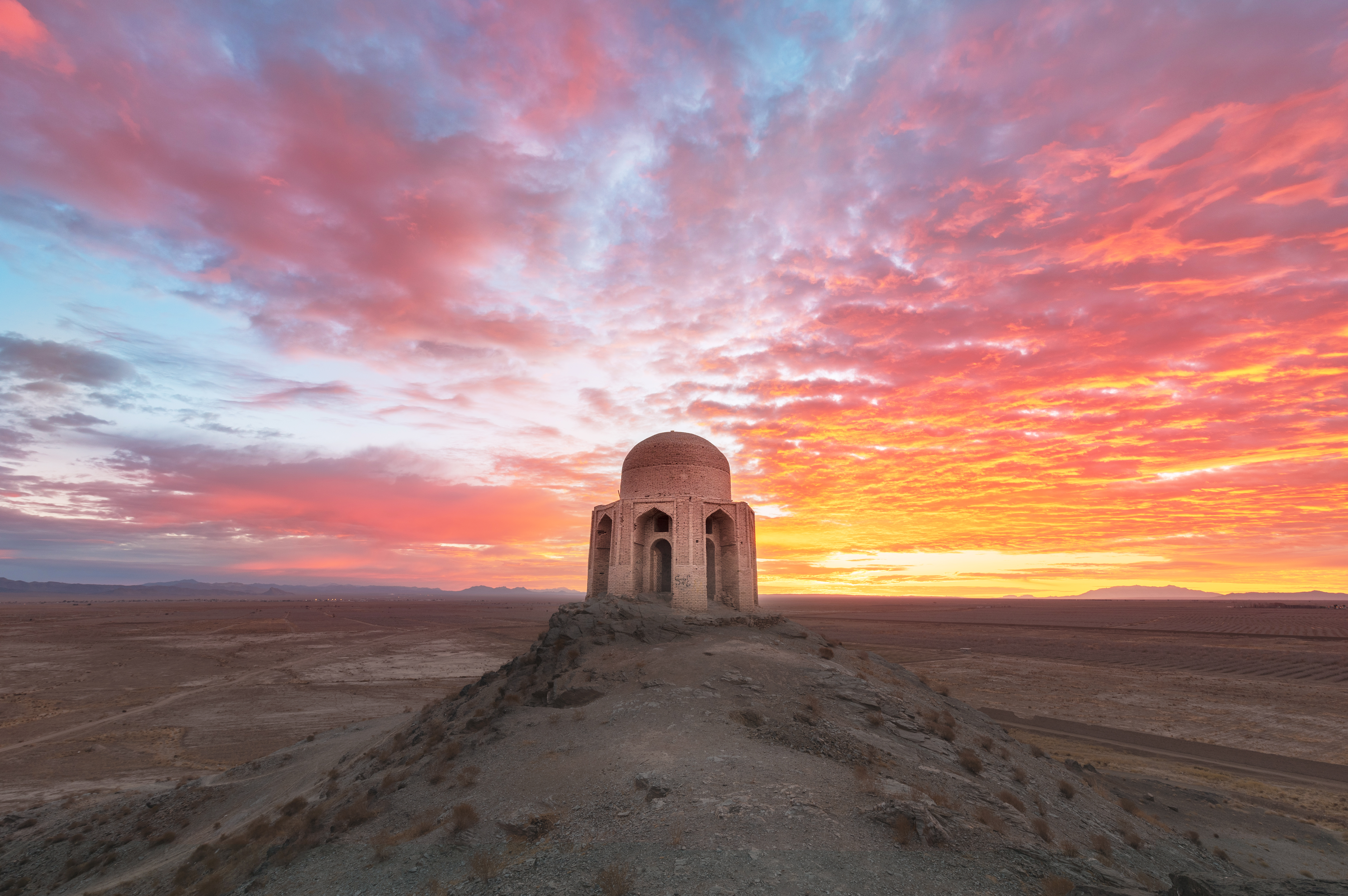
Tomb of Shah Firooz

The Chopoqi Windcatcher is a Pahlavi era windcatcher located in Sirjan, Kerman province, Iran.

=== Tomb of Mire Zobeyr ===
The Tomb of Mire Zobeyr is an Ilkhanid tomb located in Sirjan County.

=== Tomb of Shah Firooz ===
The Tomb of Shah Firooz is a ninth century AH tomb located in Sirjan County.

=== Sang Castle ===
Sang Castle is the ruins of the medieval city of Sirjan, destroyed by Timur. It is a historic citadel dating back to the Sasanian era located in Sirjan County.

== Transport ==
The city has a railway station which is forms an Abadi (rural locality) within the Iranian census. At the 2006 census, its population was 752, in 172 families.

== Gallery ==
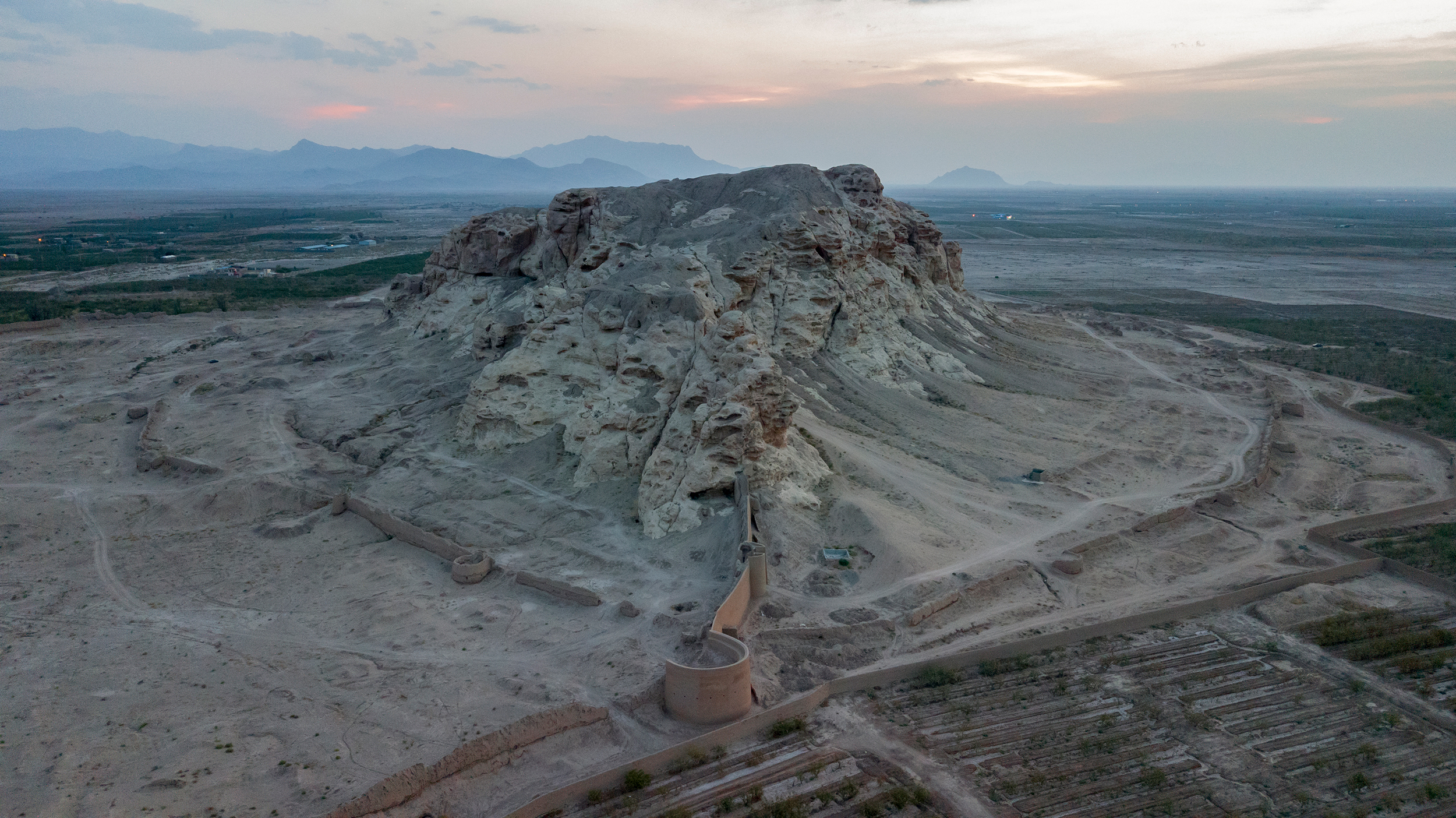
Sang Castle

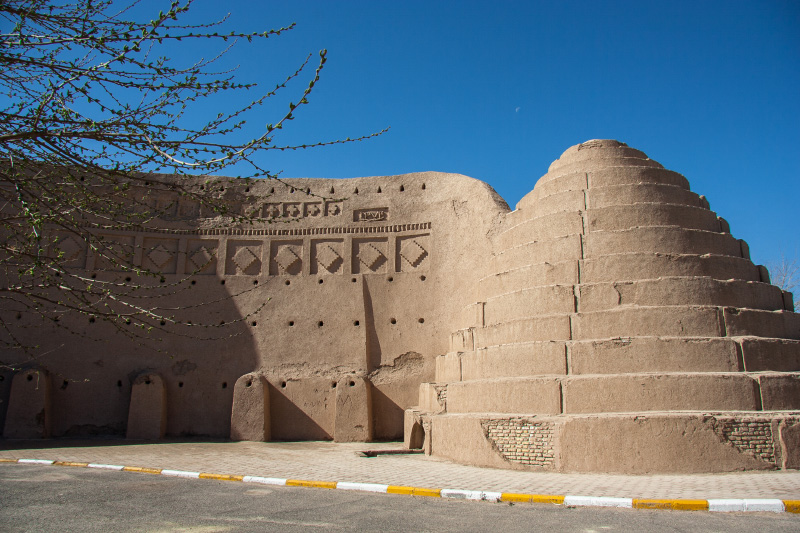
Chopoqi Windcatcher

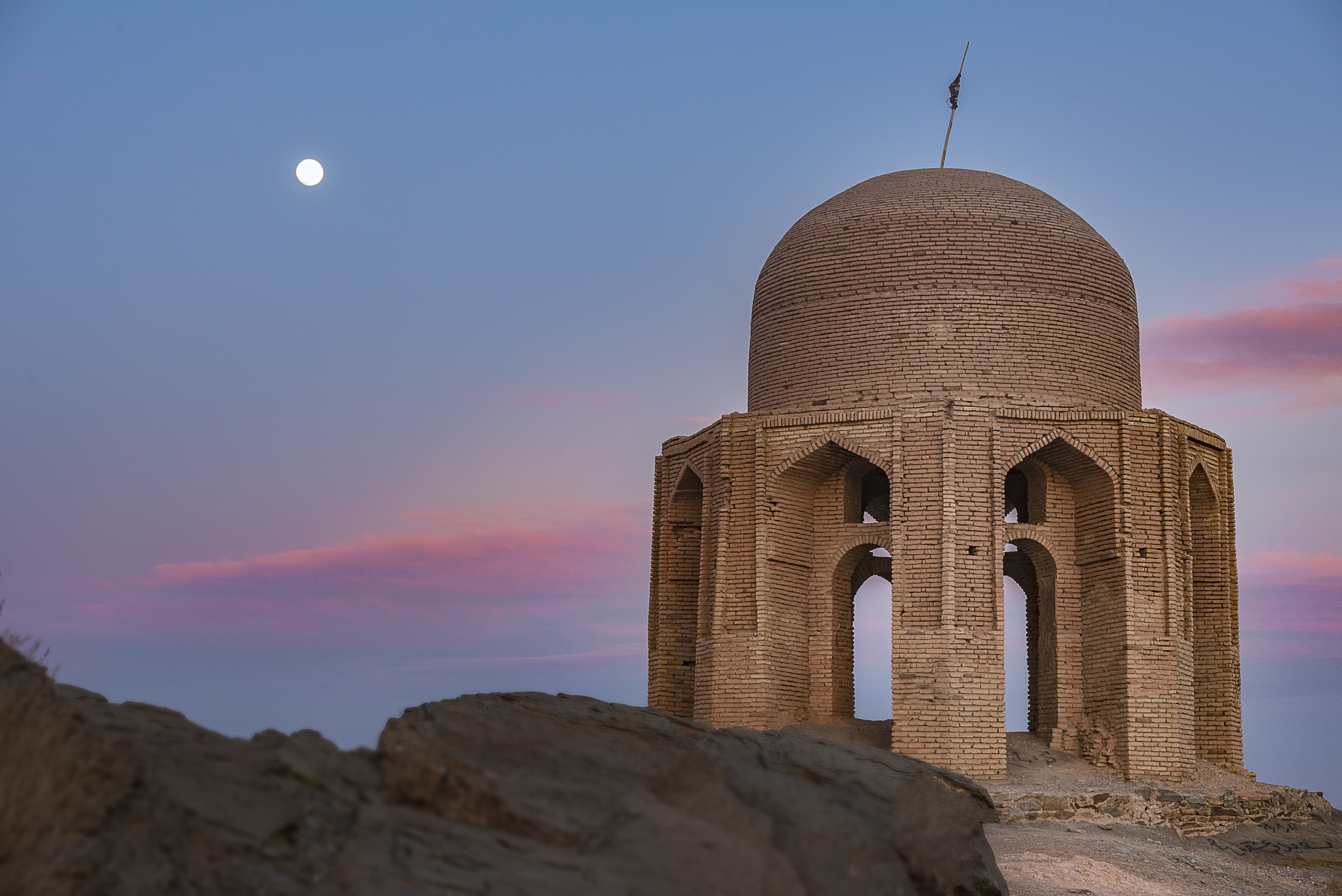
Tomb of Shah Firooz

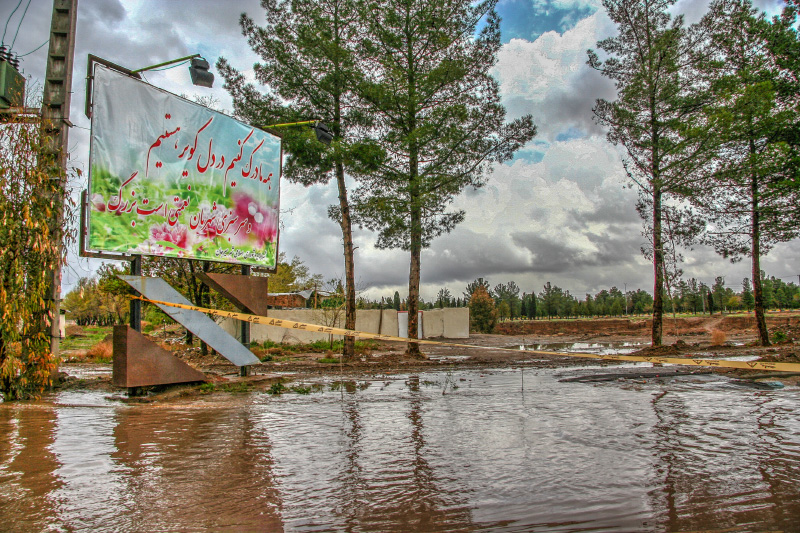
Heavy rain in sirjan

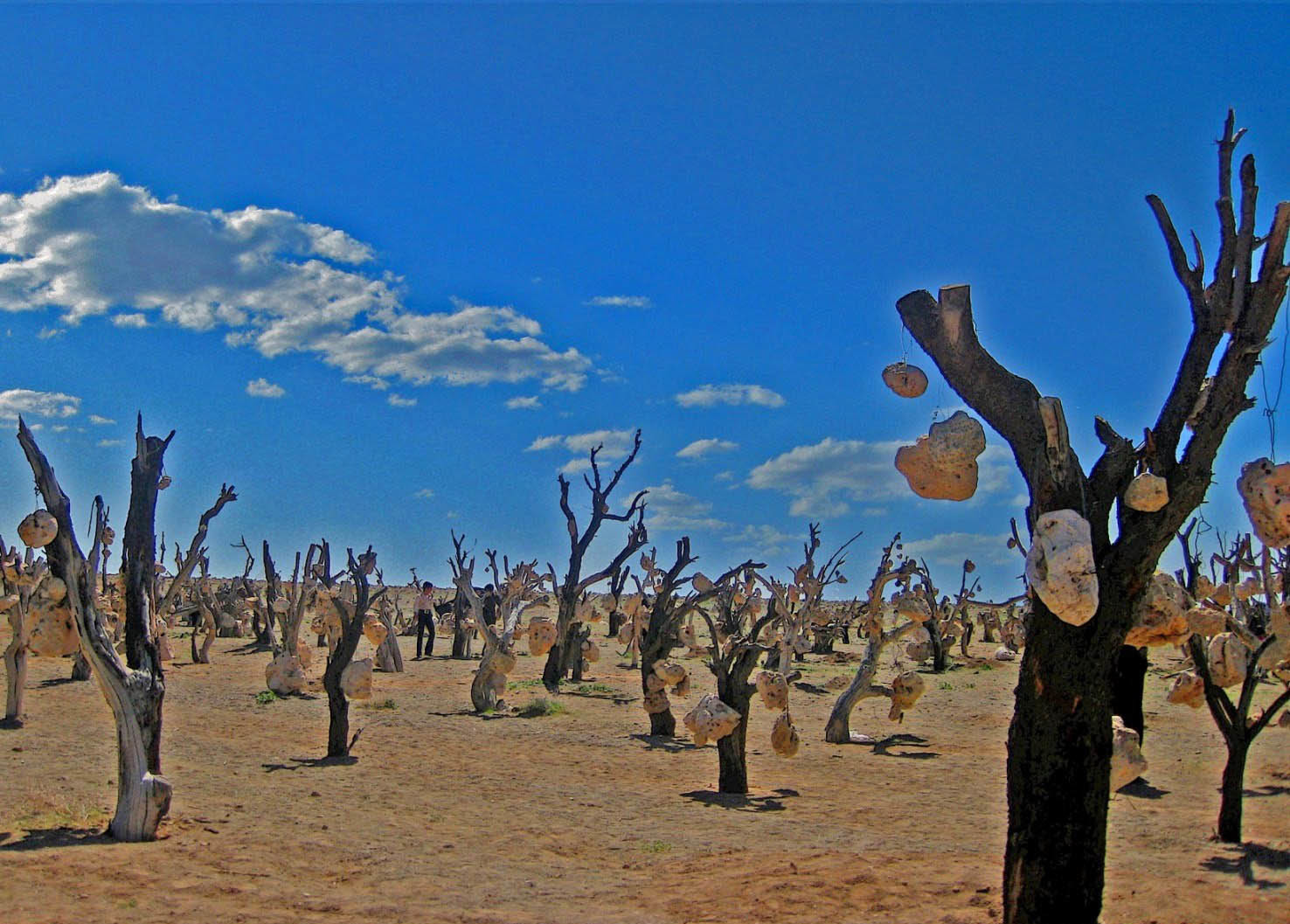
The Stone Garden in Sirjan

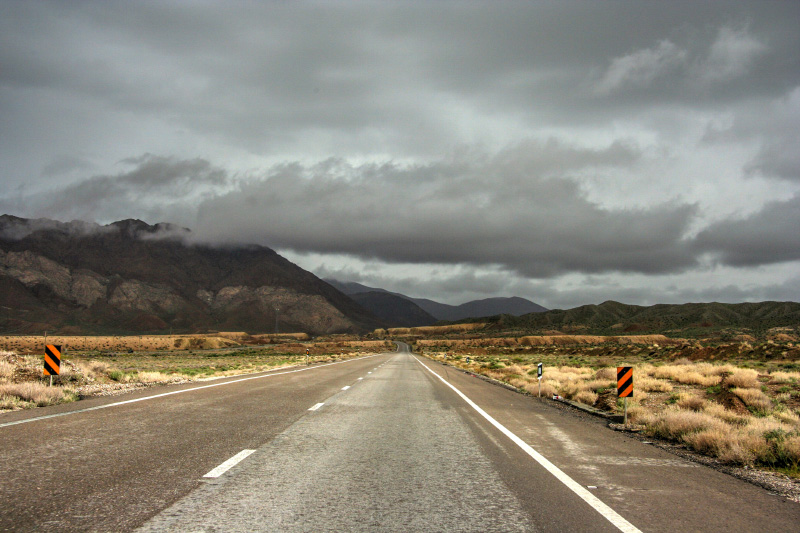
Sirjan county
