= Balvard District =

District in Kerman province, Iran

Balvard District Persian: بخش بلورد
- District
- Location within Iran
- Coordinates: 29°29′55″N 56°09′29″E
- Country: Iran
- Province: Kerman
- County: Sirjan
- Capital: Balvard

Population (2016)
  - Total: 11,473
- Time zone: UTC+3:30 (IRST)

Balvard District (Persian: بخش بلورد) is in Sirjan County, Kerman province, Iran. Its capital is the city of Balvard.

== History ==
In 2010, Balvard and Chahar Gonbad Rural Districts were separated from the Central District in the formation of Balvard District. After the 2011 National Census, the village of Balvard was elevated to the status of a city.

== Demographics ==
=== Population ===
At the time of the 2011 census, the district's population was 2,204 households. The 2016 census measured the population of the district as 11,473 inhabitants in 3,623 households.

=== Administrative divisions ===
Balvard District Population
| Administrative Divisions | 2011 | 2016 |
|---|---|---|
| Balvard RD | 5,711 | 3,621 |
| Chahar Gonbad RD | 2,072 | 4,318 |
| Balvard (city) | | 3,534 |
| Total | 7,783 | 11,473 |
RD = Rural District
