= Zeydabad Rural District =

Rural district in Kerman province, Iran

Zeydabad Rural District Persian: دهستان زیدآباد
- Rural District
- Location within Iran
- Coordinates: 29°38′26″N 55°27′31″E
- Country: Iran
- Province: Kerman
- County: Sirjan
- District: Zeydabad
- Capital: Zeydabad

Population (2016)
  - Total: 5,998
- Time zone: UTC+3:30 (IRST)

Zeydabad Rural District (Persian: دهستان زیدآباد) is in Zeydabad District of Sirjan County, Kerman province, Iran. It is administered from the city of Zeydabad.

== Demographics ==
=== Population ===
At the time of the 2006 National Census, the rural district's population (as a part of the Central District) was 3,022 in 773 households. There were 3,259 inhabitants in 943 households at the following census of 2011, by which time the rural district had been separated from the district in the formation of Zeydabad District. The 2016 census measured the population of the rural district as 5,998 in 1,769 households. The most populous of its 79 villages was Ebrahimabad-e Zarduiyeh, with 649 people.
