= Najafabad Rural District (Sirjan County) =

Rural district in Kerman province, Iran

Najafabad Rural District Persian: دهستان نجف آباد
- Rural District
- Location within Iran
- Coordinates: 29°23′29″N 55°45′00″E
- Country: Iran
- Province: Kerman
- County: Sirjan
- District: Central
- Capital: Najafshahr

Population (2016)
  - Total: 8,474
- Time zone: UTC+3:30 (IRST)

Najafabad Rural District (Persian: دهستان نجف آباد) is in the Central District of Sirjan County, Kerman province, Iran. It is administered from the city of Najafshahr. (Note: Formerly the village of Najafabad)

== Demographics ==
=== Population ===
At the time of the 2006 National Census, the rural district's population was 4,915 in 1,185 households. There were 7,394 inhabitants in 1,797 households at the following census of 2011. The 2016 census measured the population of the rural district as 8,474 in 2,163 households. The most populous of its 94 villages was Ezzatabad, with 2,085 people.
