= Balvard Rural District =

Rural district in Kerman province, Iran

Balvard Rural District Persian: دهستان بلورد
- Rural District
- Location within Iran
- Coordinates: 29°23′38″N 56°05′25″E
- Country: Iran
- Province: Kerman
- County: Sirjan
- District: Balvard
- Capital: Balvard

Population (2016)
  - Total: 3,621
- Time zone: UTC+3:30 (IRST)

Balvard Rural District (Persian: دهستان بلورد) is in Balvard District of Sirjan County, Kerman province, Iran. It is administered from the city of Balvard.

== Demographics ==
=== Population ===
At the time of the 2006 National Census, the rural district's population (as a part of the Central District) was 4,927 in 1,127 households. There were 5,711 inhabitants in 1,571 households at the following census of 2011, by which time the rural district had been separated from the district in the formation of Balvard District. The 2016 census measured the population of the rural district as 3,621 in 1,134 households. The most populous of its 116 villages was Kahn-e Siyah, with 328 people.
