= Sharifabad Rural District (Sirjan County) =

Rural district in Kerman province, Iran

Sharifabad Rural District Persian: دهستان شريف آباد
- Rural District
- Location within Iran
- Coordinates: 29°16′08″N 55°19′48″E
- Country: Iran
- Province: Kerman
- County: Sirjan
- District: Central
- Capital: Sharifabad

Population (2016)
  - Total: 16,861
- Time zone: UTC+3:30 (IRST)

Sharifabad Rural District (Persian: دهستان شريف آباد) is in the Central District of Sirjan County, Kerman province, Iran. Its capital is the village of Sharifabad.

== Demographics ==
=== Population ===
At the time of the 2006 National Census, the rural district's population was 9,764 in 2,332 households. There were 12,419 inhabitants in 3,430 households at the following census of 2011. The 2016 census measured the population of the rural district as 16,861 in 4,881 households. The most populous of its 160 villages was Hojjatabad, with 3,350 people.
