= Golestan Rural District (Sirjan County) =

Rural district in Kerman province, Iran

Golestan Rural District Persian: دهستان گلستان
- Rural District
- Location within Iran
- Coordinates: 28°55′32″N 55°40′52″E
- Country: Iran
- Province: Kerman
- County: Sirjan
- District: Golestan
- Capital: Hajjiabad

Population (2016)
  - Total: 5,647
- Time zone: UTC+3:30 (IRST)

Golestan Rural District (Persian: دهستان گلستان) is in Golestan District of Sirjan County, Kerman province, Iran. Its capital is the village of Hajjiabad.

== Demographics ==
=== Population ===
At the time of the 2006 National Census, the rural district's population (as a part of the Central District) was 5,481 in 1,425 households. There were 4,695 inhabitants in 1,343 households at the following census of 2011, by which time the rural district had been separated from the district in the formation of Golestan District. The 2016 census measured the population of the rural district as 5,647 in 1,725 households. The most populous of its 195 villages was Tolombeh-ye Kuh-e Khvajeh, with 311 people.
