= Chahar Gonbad Rural District =

Rural district in Kerman province, Iran

Chahar Gonbad Rural District Persian: دهستان چهار گنبد
- Rural District
- Location within Iran
- Coordinates: 29°40′08″N 56°11′00″E
- Country: Iran
- Province: Kerman
- County: Sirjan
- District: Balvard
- Capital: Takyeh

Population (2016)
  - Total: 4,318
- Time zone: UTC+3:30 (IRST)

Chahar Gonbad Rural District (Persian: دهستان چهار گنبد) is in Balvard District of Sirjan County, Kerman province, Iran. Its capital is the village of Takyeh.

== Demographics ==
=== Population ===
At the time of the 2006 National Census, the rural district's population (as a part of the Central District) was 2,564 in 655 households. There were 2,072 inhabitants in 633 households at the following census of 2011, by which time the rural district had been separated from the district in the formation of Balvard District. The 2016 census measured the population of the rural district as 4,318 in 1,380 households. The most populous of its 244 villages was Chenaran, with 283 people.

== Industry ==
The rural district contains many copper and metal mines. One metal mine is near Bolboli village and the biggest copper mine is near Takht. The name of the company is Takhtgonbad Copper Mine and it is 80 km from Sirjan, the capital of the county.
