= Sirjan County =

County in Kerman province, Iran

Sirjan County Persian: شهرستان سیرجان
- County
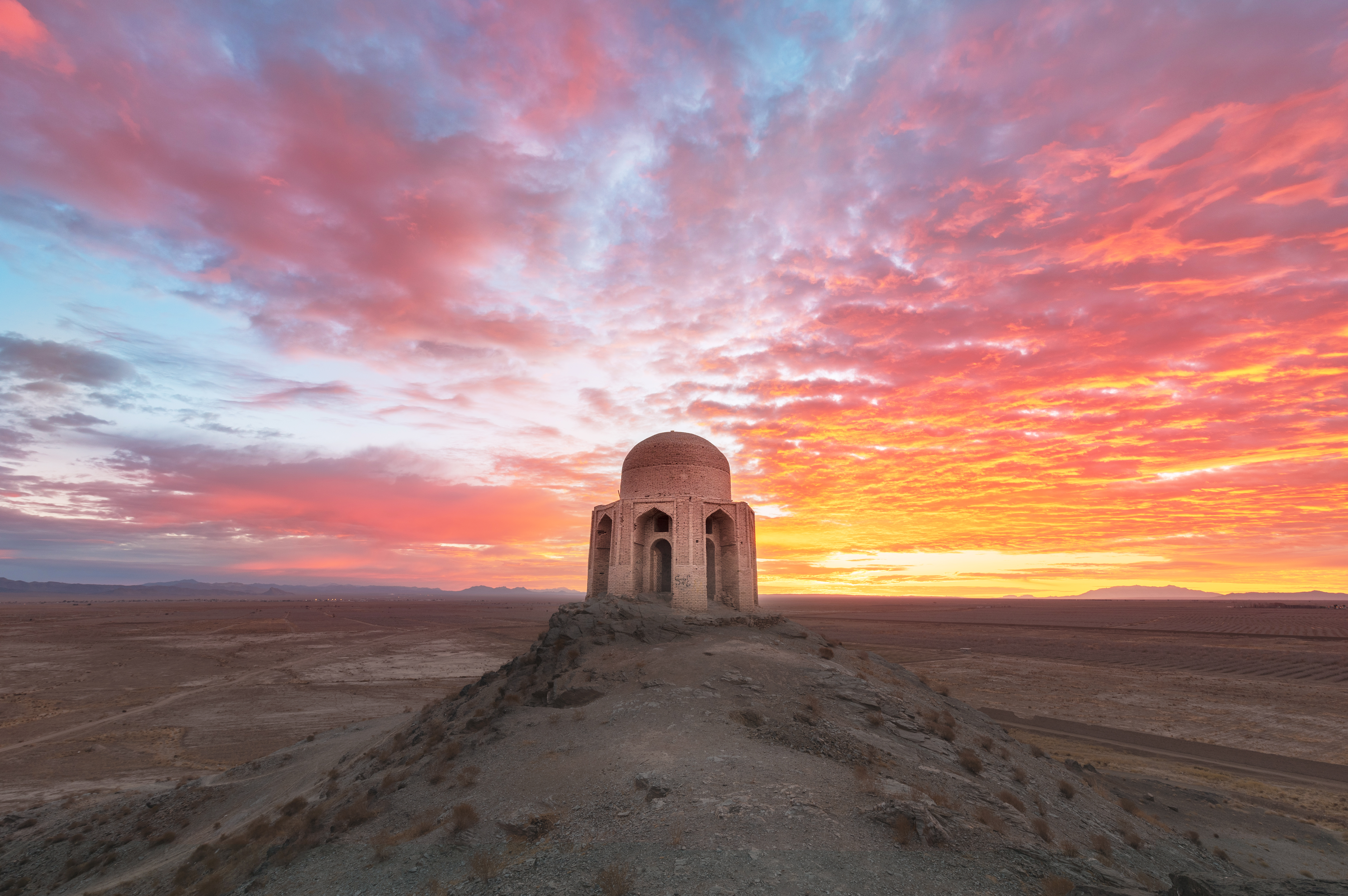
- Tomb of Shah Firooz

- Location of Sirjan County in Kerman province (center left, green)

- Location of Kerman province in Iran
- Coordinates: 29°20′N 55°42′E
- Country: Iran
- Province: Kerman
- Capital: Sirjan
- Districts: Central, Balvard, Golestan, Pariz, Zeydabad

Population (2016)
  - Total: 324,103
- Time zone: UTC+3:30 (IRST)

Sirjan County (Persian: شهرستان سیرجان) is in Kerman province, Iran. Its capital is the city of Sirjan.

== History ==
After the 2006 National Census, Balvard and Chahar Gonbad Rural Districts were separated from the Central District in the formation of Balvard District; Golestan and Malekabad Rural Districts to form Golestan District; and Mahmudabad-e Seyyed and Zeydabad Rural Districts to form Zeydabad District. Additionally, the village of Saadatabad merged with several villages to become the city of Hamashahr.

After the 2011 census, the villages of Balvard and Malekabad were elevated to city status as Balvard and Khvajeh Shahr, respectively. The city of Zeydabad was transferred from the Central District to Zeydabad District.

== Demographics ==
=== Population ===
At the time of the 2006 census, the county's population was 239,455 in 58,253 households. The following census in 2011 counted 267,697 people in 73,560 households. The 2016 census measured the population of the county as 324,103 in 95,357 households.

=== Administrative divisions ===
Sirjan County's population history and administrative structure over three consecutive censuses are shown in the following table.

Sirjan County Population
Administrative Divisions	2006	2011	2016
Central District	226,073	220,144	245,203
Balvard RD	4,927		
Chahar Gonbad RD	2,564		
Golestan RD	5,481		
Mahmudabad-e Seyyed RD	7,923		
Malekabad RD	8,381		
Najafabad RD	4,915	7,394	8,474
Sharifabad RD	9,764	12,419	16,861
Zeydabad RD	3,022		
Najafshahr (city) (Note: Formerly the village of Najafabad)	6,768	9,448	20,164
Sirjan (city)	167,014	185,623	199,704
Zeydabad (city)	5,314	5,260	
Balvard District		7,783	11,473
Balvard RD		5,711	3,621
Chahar Gonbad RD		2,072	4,318
Balvard (city)			3,534
Golestan District		13,589	17,061
Golestan RD		4,695	5,647
Malekabad RD		8,894	8,936
Khvaju Shahr (city) (Note: Formerly the village of Malekabad)			2,478
Pariz District	13,382	12,746	22,538
Pariz RD	3,065	2,869	6,165
Saadatabad RD	5,790	2,175	5,057
Hamashahr (city) (Note: Formerly the village of Saadatabad)		2,800	3,311
Pariz (city)	4,527	4,902	8,005
Zeydabad District		13,424	27,818
Mahmudabad-e Seyyed RD		10,165	12,708
Zeydabad RD		3,259	5,998
Zeydabad (city)			9,112
Total	239,455	267,697	324,103
RD = Rural District
