= Central District (Sirjan County) =

District in Kerman province, Iran

Central District (Sirjan County) Persian: بخش مرکزی شهرستان سیرجان
- District
- Location within Iran
- Coordinates: 29°16′15″N 55°26′18″E
- Country: Iran
- Province: Kerman
- County: Sirjan
- Capital: Sirjan

Population (2016)
  - Total: 245,203
- Time zone: UTC+3:30 (IRST)

The Central District of Sirjan County (Persian: بخش مرکزی شهرستان سیرجان) is in Kerman province, Iran. Its capital is the city of Sirjan.

== History ==
After the 2006 National Census, Balvard and Chahar Gonbad Rural Districts were separated from the district in the formation of Balvard District; Golestan and Malekabad Rural Districts to form Golestan District; and Mahmudabad-e Seyyed and Zeydabad Rural Districts to form Zeydabad District. After the 2011 census, the city of Zeydabad was transferred from the Central District to Zeydabad District.

== Demographics ==
=== Population ===
At the time of the 2006 census, the district's population was 226,073 in 54,895 households. The following census in 2011 counted 220,144 people in 60,252 households. The 2016 census measured the population of the district as 245,203 inhabitants in 71,694 households.

=== Administrative divisions ===
Central District (Sirjan County) Population
Administrative Divisions	2006	2011	2016
Balvard RD (Note: Transferred to Balvard District)	4,927		
Chahar Gonbad RD	2,564		
Golestan RD (Note: Transferred to Golestan District)	5,481		
Mahmudabad-e Seyyed RD (Note: Transferred to Zeydabad District)	7,923		
Malekabad RD	8,381		
Najafabad RD	4,915	7,394	8,474
Sharifabad RD	9,764	12,419	16,861
Zeydabad RD	3,022		
Najafshahr (city) (Note: Formerly the village of Najafabad)	6,768	9,448	20,164
Sirjan (city)	167,014	185,623	199,704
Zeydabad (city)	5,314	5,260	
Total	226,073	220,144	245,203
RD = Rural District
