= Sadrabad =

Sadrabad (Persian: صدراباد) may refer to:

- Sadrabad, Kazerun, Fars province
- Sadrabad, Shiraz, Fars province
- Sadrabad, Nuq, Rafsanjan County, Kerman province
- Sadrabad, Markazi
- Sadrabad, Qazvin
- Sadrabad, Nishapur, Razavi Khorasan province
- Sadrabad, Sarakhs, Razavi Khorasan province
- Sadrabad, Sistan and Baluchestan, a village in Sistan and Baluchestan Province
- Sadrabad, Saduq, Yazd province
- Sadrabad, Meybod, Meybod County, Yazd province
- Sadrabad Rural District, Meybod County, Yazd province
