= Deh Now, Yazd =

Village in Yazd province, Iran

Deh Now Persian: ده نو
- Village
- Location within Iran
- Coordinates: 31°48′39″N 54°26′26″E
- Country: Iran
- Province: Yazd
- County: Yazd
- District: Akramabad
- Rural District: Dehnow

Population (2016)
  - Total: 3,821
- Time zone: UTC+3:30 (IRST)

Deh Now (Persian: ده نو) is a village in, and the capital of Dehnow Rural District of Akramabad District, Yazd County, Yazd province, Iran.

== Demographics ==
=== Population ===
At the time of the 2006 National Census, the village's population was 3,003 in 672 households, when it was in Fahraj Rural District of the Central District. The following census in 2011 counted 3,049 people in 815 households. The 2016 census measured the population of the village as 3,821 people in 1,075 households.

In 2023, Deh Now was transferred to Dehnow Rural District created in the new Akramabad District.
