= Darbid, Yazd =

Village in Yazd province, Iran

Darbid Persian: دربيد
- Village
- Location within Iran
- Coordinates: 32°06′38″N 54°32′47″E
- Country: Iran
- Province: Yazd
- County: Zarach
- District: Allahabad
- Rural District: Darbid

Population (2016)
  - Total: 299
- Time zone: UTC+3:30 (IRST)

Darbid (Persian: دربيد) (Note: Also romanized as Dar Bīd and Darbīd) is a village in Darbid Rural District of Allahabad District of Zarach County, Yazd province, Iran, serving as capital of both the district and the rural district.

== Demographics ==
=== Population ===
At the time of the 2006 National Census, the village's population was 107 in 46 households, when it was in Allahabad Rural District of Zarach District (Note: Renamed the Central District of Zarach County) in Yazd County. The following census in 2011 counted 19 people in 11 households. The 2016 census measured the population of the village as 299 people in 92 households.

In 2023, the district was separated from the county in the establishment of Zarach County and renamed the Central District. The rural district was transferred to the new Allahabad District, and Darbid was transferred to Darbid Rural District created in the district.
