= Allahabad, Yazd =

Village in Yazd province, Iran

Allahabad Persian: اله اباد
- Village
- Location within Iran
- Coordinates: 31°59′52″N 54°14′17″E
- Country: Iran
- Province: Yazd
- County: Zarach
- District: Allahabad
- Rural District: Allahabad

Population (2016)
  - Total: 5,573
- Time zone: UTC+3:30 (IRST)

Allahabad (Persian: اله اباد) (Note: Also romanized as Allāhābād; also known as Allah Abad Rastagh and Elahābād) is a village in, and the capital of, Allahabad Rural District of Allahabad District of Zarach County, Yazd province, Iran.

== Demographics ==
=== Population ===
At the time of the 2006 National Census, the village's population was 3,068 in 770 households, when it was in Zarach District (Note: Renamed the Central District of Zarach County) of Yazd County. The following census in 2011 counted 4,626 people in 1,149 households. The 2016 census measured the population of the village as 5,573 people in 1,443 households. It was the most populous village in its rural district.

In 2023, the district was separated from the county in the establishment of Zarach County and renamed the Central District. The rural district was transferred to the new Allahabad District.
