= Hojjatabad, Yazd =

Hojjatabad حجت‌آباد
- Village
- Location within Iran
- Coordinates: 32°01′54″N 54°12′27″E
- Country: Iran
- Province: Yazd
- County: Yazd
- Bakhsh: Zarach
- Rural District: Allahabad

Population (2006)
  - Total: 11
- Time zone: UTC+3:30 (IRST)
  - Summer (DST): UTC+4:30 (IRDT)

Hojjatabad (Persian: حجت‌آباد, also Romanized as Ḩojjatābād) is a village in Allahabad Rural District, Zarach District, Yazd County, Yazd Province, Iran. At the 2006 census, its population was 11, in 6 families.
