= Mansurabad, Yazd =

Mansurabad منصوراباد
- Village
- Location within Iran
- Coordinates: 32°03′23″N 54°43′49″E
- Country: Iran
- Province: Yazd
- County: Yazd
- Bakhsh: Zarach
- Rural District: Allahabad

Population (2006)
  - Total: 15
- Time zone: UTC+3:30 (IRST)
  - Summer (DST): UTC+4:30 (IRDT)

Mansurabad (Persian: منصوراباد, also Romanized as Manşūrābād; also known as Mansoori and Manşūr) is a village in Allahabad Rural District, Zarach District, Yazd County, Yazd Province, Iran. At the 2006 census, its population was 15, in 9 families.
