= Qavamabad, Yazd =

Qavamabad قوام اباد
- village
- Location within Iran
- Coordinates: 31°49′08″N 54°04′43″E
- Country: Iran
- Province: Yazd
- County: Ashkezar
- Bakhsh: Khezrabad
- Rural District: Kezab

Population (2006)
  - Total: 86
- Time zone: UTC+3:30 (IRST)
  - Summer (DST): UTC+4:30 (IRDT)

Qavamabad (Persian: قَوام آباد, also Romanized as Qavāmābād and Ghavam Abad) is a village in Kezab Rural District, Khezrabad District, Saduq County, Yazd Province, Iran. At the 2006 census, its population was 86, in 36 families.
