= Alaviyeh =

Alaviyeh علويه
- Village
- Location within Iran
- Coordinates: 32°03′38″N 53°39′27″E
- Country: Iran
- Province: Yazd
- County: Saduq
- Bakhsh: Khezrabad
- Rural District: Nadushan

Population (2006)
  - Total: 50
- Time zone: UTC+3:30 (IRST)
  - Summer (DST): UTC+4:30 (IRDT)

Alaviyeh (Persian: علويه, also Romanized as ‘Alavīyeh) is a village in Nadushan Rural District, Khezrabad District, Saduq County, Yazd Province, Iran. At the 2006 census, its population was 50, in 20 families.
