= Eyshabad =

Eyshabad or Eishabad or Aishabad or Ayshabad (Persian: عيش اباد) may refer to:

- Eyshabad, East Azerbaijan
- Eyshabad, Isfahan
- Eyshabad, Rafsanjan, Kerman Province, Iran
- Eyshabad, Balvard, Sirjan County, Kerman Province, Iran
- Eyshabad, Chenaran, Razavi Khorasan Province, Iran
- Eyshabad, Nishapur, Razavi Khorasan Province, Iran
- Eyshabad-e Nizeh, Razavi Khorasan Province, Iran
- Eyshabad, Yazd
