= Sadrabad, Meybod =

Village in Yazd province, Iran

Sadrabad Persian: صدراباد
- Village
- Location within Iran
- Coordinates: 31°55′26″N 53°35′04″E
- Country: Iran
- Province: Yazd
- County: Meybod
- District: Nadushan
- Rural District: Sadrabad

Population (2016)
  - Total: 509
- Time zone: UTC+3:30 (IRST)

Sadrabad (Persian: صدراباد) (Note: Also romanized as Şadrābād; also known as Sadr Abad Pishkooh and Sadrābād-e Pīshkūh) is a village in, and the capital of, Sadrabad Rural District of Nadushan District of Meybod County, Yazd province, Iran.

== Demographics ==
=== Population ===
At the time of the 2006 National Census, the village's population was 396 in 118 households, when it was in Nadushan Rural District of Khezrabad District, Ashkezar County. (Note: Formerly Saduq County) The following census in 2011 counted 573 people in 167 households. The 2016 census measured the population of the village as 509 people in 162 households, by which time the rural district had been separated from the county in the establishment of Nadushan District of Meybod County. Sadrabad was transferred to Sadrabad Rural District created in the new district. It was the most populous village in its rural district.
