= Dasht Deh, Yazd =

Dasht Deh دشت ده
- Village
- Location within Iran
- Coordinates: 32°07′23″N 54°39′00″E
- Country: Iran
- Province: Yazd
- County: Yazd
- Bakhsh: Zarach
- Rural District: Allahabad

Population (2006)
  - Total: 13
- Time zone: UTC+3:30 (IRST)
  - Summer (DST): UTC+4:30 (IRDT)

Dasht Deh (Persian: دشت ده) is a village in Allahabad Rural District, Zarach District, Yazd County, Yazd Province, Iran. At the 2006 census, its population was 13, in 5 families.
