= Mohammadabad, Zarach =

Village in Yazd province, Iran

Mohammadabad Persian: محمدآباد
- Village
- Location within Iran
- Coordinates: 31°58′27″N 54°12′50″E
- Country: Iran
- Province: Yazd
- County: Zarach
- District: Central
- Rural District: Mohammadabad

Population (2016)
  - Total: 3,107
- Time zone: UTC+3:30 (IRST)

Mohammadabad (Persian: محمدآباد) (Note: Also romanized as Moḩammadābād) is a village in, and the capital of, Mohammadabad Rural District of the Central District (Note: Formerly Zarach District of Yazd County) of Zarach County, Yazd province, Iran.

== Demographics ==
=== Population ===
At the time of the 2006 National Census, the village's population was 1,730 in 419 households, when it was in Zarch District (Note: Renamed the Central District of Zarch County) of Yazd County. The following census in 2011 counted 2,718 people in 709 households. The 2016 census measured the population of the village as 3,107 people in 883 households. It was the most populous village in its rural district.

In 2023, the district was separated from the county in the establishment of Zarach County and renamed the Central District.
