= Kaad Ranching and Farming Company =

Kaad Ranching and Farming Company شركت دامپروري وزراعي كااد
- Village/company town
- Country: Iran
- Province: Yazd
- County: Yazd
- Bakhsh: Zarach
- Rural District: Mohammadabad

Population (2006)
  - Total: 17
- Time zone: UTC+3:30 (IRST)
  - Summer (DST): UTC+4:30 (IRDT)

Kaad Ranching and Farming Company (Persian: شركت دامپروري وزراعي كااد – Sherkat-e Dāmperūrī va Zerā‘ī-ye Kāād) is a village in Mohammadabad Rural District, Zarach District, Yazd County, Yazd Province, Iran. At the 2006 census, its population was 17, in 5 families.
