= Tahuneh, Yazd =

Tahuneh طاحونه
- Village
- Location within Iran
- Coordinates: 31°50′54″N 53°56′35″E
- Country: Iran
- Province: Yazd
- County: Saduq
- Bakhsh: Khezrabad
- Rural District: Kezab

Population (2006)
  - Total: 90
- Time zone: UTC+3:30 (IRST)
  - Summer (DST): UTC+4:30 (IRDT)

Tahuneh (Persian: طاحونه, also Romanized as Ţāḩūneh and Ţāhūneh) is a village in Kezab Rural District, Khezrabad District, Saduq County, Yazd Province, Iran. At the 2006 census, its population was 90, in 32 families.
