= Akramabad, Yazd =

Village in Yazd province, Iran

Akramabad Persian: اكرم اباد
- Village
- Location within Iran
- Coordinates: 31°52′34″N 54°24′31″E
- Country: Iran
- Province: Yazd
- County: Yazd
- District: Akramabad
- Rural District: Akramabad

Population (2016)
  - Total: 7,058
- Time zone: UTC+3:30 (IRST)

Akramabad (Persian: اكرم اباد) (Note: Also romanized as Akramābād) is a village in Akramabad Rural District of Akramabad District, Yazd County, Yazd province, Iran, serving as capital of both the district and the rural district.

== Demographics ==
=== Population ===
At the time of the 2006 National Census, the village's population was 4,350 in 958 households, when it was in Fahraj Rural District of the Central District. The following census in 2011 counted 3,736 people in 986 households. The 2016 census measured the population of the village as 7,058 people in 1,838 households.

In 2023, Akramabad was transferred to Akramabad Rural District created in the new Akramabad District.
