= Sadrabad Rural District =

Rural district in Yazd province, Iran

Sadrabad Rural District Persian: دهستان صدرآباد
- Rural District
- Location within Iran
- Coordinates: 31°47′33″N 53°21′40″E
- Country: Iran
- Province: Yazd
- County: Meybod
- District: Nadushan
- Capital: Sadrabad

Population (2016)
  - Total: 552
- Time zone: UTC+3:30 (IRST)

Sadrabad Rural District (Persian: دهستان صدرآباد) is in Nadushan District of Meybod County, Yazd province, Iran. Its capital is the village of Sadrabad.

== History ==
After the 2011 National Census, Nadushan Rural District and the city of Nadushan were separated from Khezrabad District of Ashkezar County (Note: Formerly Saduq County) in the formation of Nadushan District, and Sadrabad Rural District was created in the new district.

== Demographics ==
=== Population ===
At the time of the 2016 census, the rural district's population was 552 in 168 households. The most populous of its 17 villages was Sadrabad, with 509 people.
