= Neyuk-e Sofla =

Village in Yazd province, Iran

Neyuk-e Sofla Persian: نيوك سفلي
- Village
- Location within Iran
- Coordinates: 32°03′29″N 53°44′54″E
- Country: Iran
- Province: Yazd
- County: Meybod
- District: Nadushan
- Rural District: Nadushan

Population (2016)
  - Total: 112
- Time zone: UTC+3:30 (IRST)

Neyuk-e Sofla (Persian: نيوك سفلي) (Note: Also romanized as Neyūk-e Soflá; also known as Neyūk) is a village in Nadushan Rural District of Nadushan District, Meybod County, Yazd province, Iran.

== Demographics ==
=== Population ===
At the time of the 2006 National Census, the village's population was 90 in 30 households, when it was in Khezrabad District of Ashkezar County. (Note: Formerly Saduq County) The following census in 2011 counted 150 people in 52 households. The 2016 census measured the population of the village as 112 people in 34 households, by which time the rural district had been separated from the county in the establishment of Nadushan District of Meybod County. It was the most populous village in its rural district.
