= Ezabad, Yazd =

Ezabad عزآباد
- Village
- Location within Iran
- Coordinates: 32°04′50″N 54°07′35″E
- Country: Iran
- Province: Yazd
- County: Saduq
- Bakhsh: Central
- Rural District: Rostaq

Population (2006)
  - Total: 308
- Time zone: UTC+3:30 (IRST)
  - Summer (DST): UTC+4:30 (IRDT)

Ezabad (Persian: عزاباد, also Romanized as ‘Ezābād and Ezz Abad; also known as Izābād) is a village in Rostaq Rural District, in the Central District of Saduq County, Yazd Province, Iran. At the 2006 census, its population was 308, in 82 families.
