= Rahmatabad Castle =

Castle in Yazd Province, Iran

Rahmatabad castle
- قلعه رحمت‌آباد

General information
- Type: Castle
- Location: Hamidiya, Iran

Rahmatabad castle (Persian: قلعه رحمت‌آباد) is a historical castle located in Yazd County in Yazd Province, The longevity of this fortress dates back to the Historical periods after Islam.
