= Char Khab, Yazd =

Chár Khāb چَرخاب
- village
- Location within Iran
- Coordinates: 31°56′42″N 54°10′25″E
- Country: Iran
- Province: Yazd
- County: Ashkezar
- Bakhsh: Central
- Rural District: Ashkezar

Population (2018)
  - Total: 145
- Time zone: UTC+3:30 (IRST)
  - Summer (DST): UTC+4:30 (IRDT)

Char Khab (Persian: چَرخاب, also Romanized as Chár Khāb and ChárkhĀb) is a village in Ashkezar Rural District, in the Central District of Yazd Province, Iran. In the year 2018, its population was 145, in 39 families.
