= Chah Akrami =

Village in Yazd province, Iran

Chah Akrami Persian: چاه اكرمي
- Village
- Location within Iran
- Coordinates: 31°50′42″N 54°25′39″E
- Country: Iran
- Province: Yazd
- County: Yazd
- District: Central
- Rural District: Fahraj

Population (2016)
  - Total: 10,311
- Time zone: UTC+3:30 (IRST)

Chah Akrami (Persian: چاه اكرمي) is a village in Fahraj Rural District of the Central District of Yazd County, Yazd province, Iran.

== Demographics ==
=== Population ===
At the time of the 2006 National Census, the village's population was 2,774 in 609 households. The following census in 2011 counted 4,614 people in 1,200 households. The 2016 census measured the population of the village as 10,311 people in 2,960 households. It was the most populous village in its rural district.
