= Shahneh, Yazd =

Village in Yazd province, Iran

Shahneh Persian: شحنه
- Village
- Location within Iran
- Coordinates: 31°51′42″N 54°15′57″E
- Country: Iran
- Province: Yazd
- County: Yazd
- District: Central
- Rural District: Fajr

Population (2016)
  - Total: 1,171
- Time zone: UTC+3:30 (IRST)

Shahneh (Persian: شحنه) (Note: Also romanized as Shaḩneh or Sheḩneh) is a village in, and the capital of, Fajr Rural District of the Central District of Yazd County, Yazd province, Iran. The previous capital of the rural district was the village of Kheyrabad.

== Demographics ==
=== Population ===
At the time of the 2006 National Census, the village's population was 878 in 241 households. The following census in 2011 counted 894 people in 270 households. The 2016 census measured the population of the village as 1,171 people in 359 households. It was the most populous village in its rural district.
