= Hoseynabad, Yazd =

Hoseynabad حسين اباد
- Village
- Location within Iran
- Coordinates: 32°05′14″N 54°44′18″E
- Country: Iran
- Province: Yazd
- County: Yazd
- Bakhsh: Zarach
- Rural District: Allahabad

Population (2006)
  - Total: 22
- Time zone: UTC+3:30 (IRST)
  - Summer (DST): UTC+4:30 (IRDT)

Hoseynabad (Persian: حسين اباد, also Romanized as Ḩoseynābād and Hosein Abad) is a village in Allahabad Rural District, Zarach District, Yazd County, Yazd Province, Iran. At the 2006 census, its population was 22, in 10 families.
