= Ebrahimabad, Ashkezar =

Village in Yazd province, Iran

Ebrahimabad Shamsi Persian: ابراهيم ابادِ شمسی
- Village
- Location within Iran
- Coordinates: 32°06′09″N 54°05′46″E
- Country: Iran
- Province: Yazd
- County: Ashkezar
- District: Central
- Rural District: Rostaq

Population (2016)
  - Total: 1,509
- Time zone: UTC+3:30 (IRST)

Ebrahimabad (Persian: ابراهيم اباد) (Note: Also romanized as Ebrāhīmābād and Ibrāhīmābad; also known as Ebrahīm Abad Rastaq) is a village in Rostaq Rural District of the Central District of Ashkezar County, (Note: Formerly Saduq County) Yazd province, Iran.

== Demographics ==
=== Population ===
At the time of the 2006 National Census, the village's population was 1,207 in 328 households. The following census in 2011 counted 1,394 people in 410 households. The 2016 census measured the population of the village as 1,509 people in 453 households. It was the most populous village in its rural district.
