= Ezabad =

Ezabad or Ezzabad or Ezz Abad (Persian: عزاباد) may refer to:

- Ezzabad, Arsanjan, Fars Province
- Ezzabad, Marvdasht, Fars Province
- Ezzabad, Sepidan, Fars Province
- Ezabad, Yazd
