= Khavidak Castle =

Iranian national heritage site

Khavidak castle
- قلعه خویدک
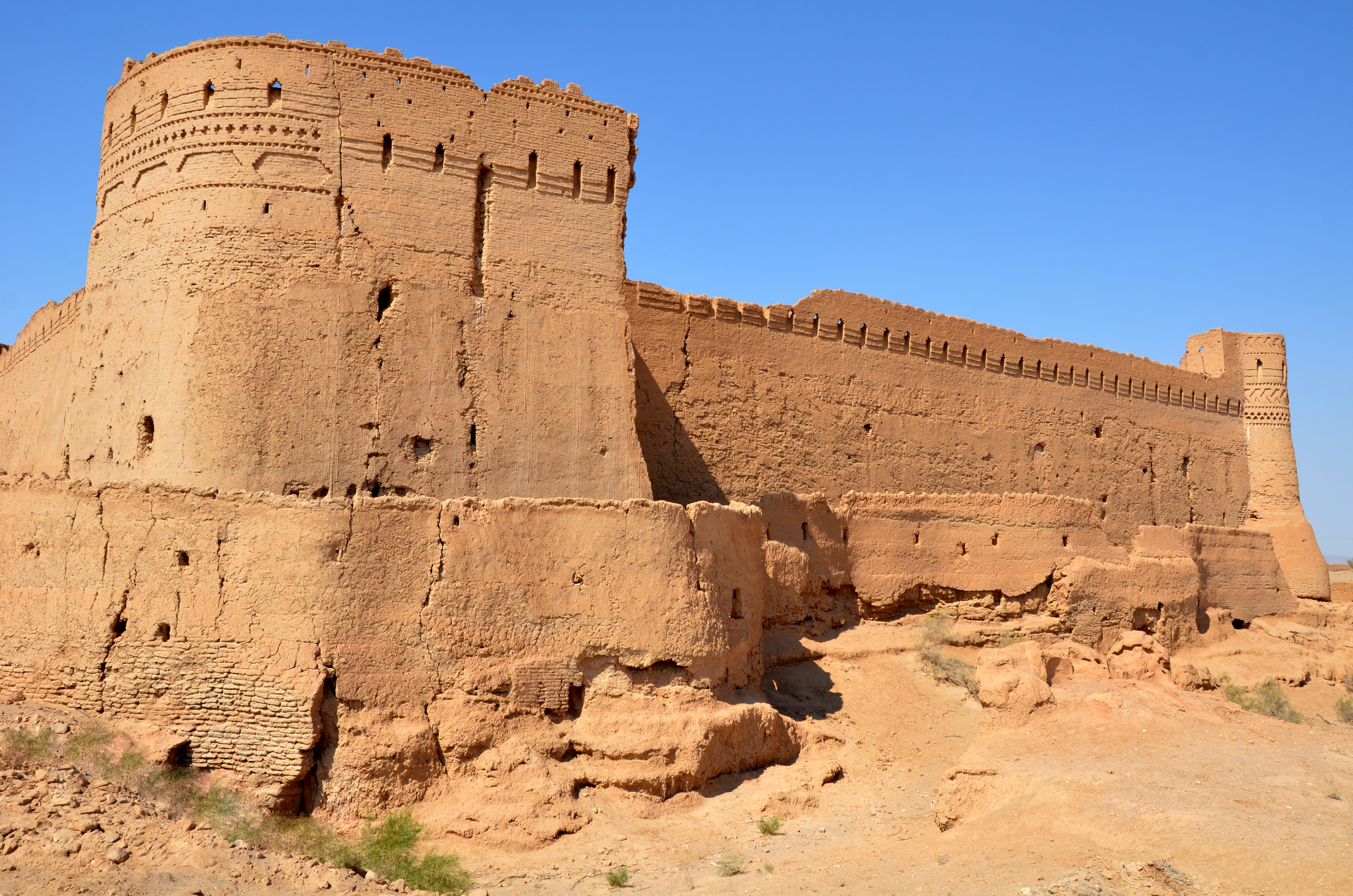
- Interactive map of the Khavidak castle area

General information
- Type: Castle
- Location: Khavidak, Iran

Khavidak castle (Persian: قلعه خویدک) is a historical castle located in Yazd County in Yazd Province, The longevity of this fortress dates back to the Sasanian Empire.
