= Mohammadabad, Yazd =

Village in Yazd province, Iran

Mohammadabad Persian: محمداباد
- Village
- Location within Iran
- Coordinates: 31°46′30″N 54°25′21″E
- Country: Iran
- Province: Yazd
- County: Yazd
- District: Central
- Rural District: Fahraj

Population (2016)
  - Total: 3,277
- Time zone: UTC+3:30 (IRST)

Mohammadabad (Persian: محمداباد) (Note: Also romanized as Moḩammadābād; also known as Mandaba (مندبا), Mandava (مَندَوا), and Muhammadābād) is a village in, and the capital of, Fahraj Rural District of the Central District of Yazd County, Yazd province, Iran.

== Demographics ==
=== Population ===
At the time of the 2006 National Census, the village's population was 2,698 in 709 households. The following census in 2011 counted 2,292 people in 724 households. The 2016 census measured the population of the village as 3,277 people in 1,032 households.
