= Surk-e Sofla =

Surk-e Sofla سورك سفلي
- Village
- Location within Iran
- Coordinates: 32°09′07″N 53°25′15″E
- Country: Iran
- Province: Yazd
- County: Saduq
- Bakhsh: Khezrabad
- Rural District: Nadushan

Population (2006)
  - Total: 203
- Time zone: UTC+3:30 (IRST)
  - Summer (DST): UTC+4:30 (IRDT)

Surk-e Sofla (Persian: سورك سفلي, also Romanized as Sūrk-e Soflá; also known as Sūrak-e Pā’īn and Sūrk-e Pā’īn) is a village in Nadushan Rural District, Meybod District, Meybod County, Yazd Province, Iran. At the 2006 census, its population was 203, in 75 families.
