= Darbid Rural District (Zarach County) =

Rural district in Yazd province, Iran

Darbid Rural District Persian: دهستان دربید
- Rural District
- Location within Iran
- Coordinates: 32°05′00″N 54°38′30″E
- Country: Iran
- Province: Yazd
- County: Zarach
- District: Allahabad
- Capital: Darbid
- Time zone: UTC+3:30 (IRST)

Darbid Rural District (Persian: دهستان دربید) is in Allahabad District of Zarach County, Yazd province, Iran. Its capital is the village of Darbid, whose population at the time of the 2016 National Census was 299 in 92 households.

In 2023, Zarach District (Note: Renamed the Central District of Zarach County) was separated from Yazd County in the establishment of Zarach County and renamed the Central District. Darbid Rural District was created in the new Allahabad District.
