= Khvorshidabad, Yazd =

Khvorshidabad خورشيداباد
- Village
- Location within Iran
- Coordinates: 32°06′55″N 54°38′43″E
- Country: Iran
- Province: Yazd
- County: Yazd
- Bakhsh: Zarach
- Rural District: Allahabad

Population (2006)
  - Total: 9
- Time zone: UTC+3:30 (IRST)
  - Summer (DST): UTC+4:30 (IRDT)

Khvorshidabad (Persian: خورشيداباد, also Romanized as Khvorshīdābād, Khowrshīdābād, and Khowrshīdābād) is a village in Allahabad Rural District, Zarach District, Yazd County, Yazd Province, Iran. At the 2006 census, its population was 9, in 4 families.
