= Kheyrabad, Yazd =

Neighborhood in Yazd province, Iran

Kheyrabad Persian: خيراباد
- Neighborhood
- Location within Iran
- Coordinates: 31°51′45″N 54°18′57″E
- Country: Iran
- Province: Yazd
- County: Yazd
- District: Central
- City: Yazd

Population (2006)
  - Total: 5,794
- Time zone: UTC+3:30 (IRST)

Kheyrabad (Persian: خيراباد) (Note: Also romanized as Kheyrābād; also known as Bāgh-e Kher, Bāgh-i-Kher, Hairābād, Khairābād, and Kheir Abad Hoomeh) is a neighborhood in the city of Yazd in the Central District of Yazd County, Yazd province, Iran. As a village, it was the capital of Fajr Rural District until its capital was transferred to the village of Shahneh.

== Demographics ==
=== Population ===
At the time of the 2006 National Census, Kheyrabad's population was 5,794 in 1,596 households, when it was a village in Fajr Rural District. Kheyrabad has been annexed to the city of Yazd.
