= Surak, Iran (disambiguation) =

Surak, Iran is a city in Mazandaran Province, Iran.

Surak or Surk (Persian: سورك) may also refer to:

- Surk, Chaharmahal and Bakhtiari
- Surak, Kerman
- Surak, Amol, Mazandaran Province
- Surak, Neka, Mazandaran Province
- Surak, Sistan and Baluchestan
- Surak, Yazd
- Surk-e Sofla, Yazd Province
- Surak Rural District, in Hormozgan Province
