= Tamehr =

Tamehr طامهر
- Village
- Location within Iran
- Coordinates: 32°07′58″N 54°35′52″E
- Country: Iran
- Province: Yazd
- County: Yazd
- Bakhsh: Zarach
- Rural District: Allahabad

Population (2006)
  - Total: 57
- Time zone: UTC+3:30 (IRST)
  - Summer (DST): UTC+4:30 (IRDT)

Tamehr (Persian: طامهر, also Romanized as Ţāmehr; also known as Tāmar and Tamer) is a village in Allahabad Rural District, Zarach District, Yazd County, Yazd Province, Iran. At the 2006 census, its population was 57, in 24 families.
