= Tamer (disambiguation) =

Tamer is a given name and a surname. It may also refer to:

== Places ==
- Tamer, Iran, a village in Kerman Province, Iran
- Tamer, Golestan, a village in Golestan Province, Iran
- Tamer, Yazd, a village in Yazd Province, Iran
- Tamer, Btaaboura, a village in Koura, Lebanon

== Other uses ==
- A person involved with lion taming
- Tamer (1801 ship), a slave ship
- Tamer II, a custom sail yacht
- Tamer Institute for Community Education, a Palestinian educational organization
