= Eyshabad, Yazd =

Neighborhood in Yazd province, Iran

Eyshabad Persian: عيش اباد
- Neighborhood
- Location within Iran
- Coordinates: 31°52′12″N 54°19′47″E
- Country: Iran
- Province: Yazd
- County: Yazd
- District: Central
- City: Yazd

Population (2006)
  - Total: 5,144
- Time zone: UTC+3:30 (IRST)

Eyshabad (Persian: عيش اباد) (Note: Also romanized as ‘Eyshābād) is a neighborhood in the city of Yazd in the Central District of Yazd County, Yazd province, Iran.

== Demographics ==
=== Population ===
At the time of the 2006 National Census, Eyshabad's population was 5,144 in 1,326 households, when it was a village in Fajr Rural District. Eyshabad has been annexed to the city of Yazd.
