= Khavidak =

Khavidak خويدك
- Village
- Location within Iran
- Coordinates: 31°48′00″N 54°30′29″E
- Country: Iran
- Province: Yazd
- County: Yazd
- Bakhsh: Central
- Rural District: Fahraj

Population (2006)
  - Total: 985
- Time zone: UTC+3:30 (IRST)
  - Summer (DST): UTC+4:30 (IRDT)

Khavidak (Persian: خويدك, also Romanized as Khavīdak) is a village in Fahraj Rural District, in the Central District of Yazd County, Yazd Province, Iran. At the 2006 census, its population was 985, in 234 families.
