= Hamaneh, Ashkezar =

Village in Yazd province, Iran

Hamaneh Persian: هامانه
- Village
- Location within Iran
- Coordinates: 31°50′53″N 53°52′56″E
- Country: Iran
- Province: Yazd
- County: Ashkezar
- District: Khezrabad
- Rural District: Kezab

Population (2016)
  - Total: 377
- Time zone: UTC+3:30 (IRST)

Hamaneh (Persian: هامانه) (Note: Also romanized as Hāmāneh; also known as Hamaneh Kazabat and Hāmāneh-ye Kez̄āb) is a village in Kezab Rural District of Khezrabad District of Ashkezar County, (Note: Formerly Saduq County) Yazd province, Iran.

== Demographics ==
=== Population ===
At the time of the 2006 National Census, the village's population was 187 in 60 households. The following census in 2011 counted 442 people in 137 households. The 2016 census measured the population of the village as 377 people in 124 households. It was the most populous village in its rural district.
