= Atabak, Iran =

Atabak or Atabek (Persian: اتابک) may refer to:

- Atabak, Fars
- Atabak, Kurdistan
- Atabak, Tehran
- Atabak, Yazd
