= Sadrabad, Ashkezar =

Village in Yazd province, Iran

Sadrabad Persian: صدراباد
- Village
- Location within Iran
- Coordinates: 32°04′06″N 54°06′11″E
- Country: Iran
- Province: Yazd
- County: Ashkezar
- District: Central
- Rural District: Rostaq

Population (2016)
  - Total: 1,475
- Time zone: UTC+3:30 (IRST)

Sadrabad (Persian: صدراباد) (Note: Also romanized as Şadrābād; also known as Şadrābād Pā’īn) is a village in, and the capital of, Rostaq Rural District of the Central District of Ashkezar County, (Note: Formerly Saduq County) Yazd province, Iran.

== Demographics ==
=== Population ===
At the time of the 2006 National Census, the village's population was 1,282 in 357 households. The following census in 2011 counted 1,388 people in 422 households. The 2016 census measured the population of the village as 1,475 people in 452 households.
