= Charkhab =

Charkhab or Char Khab or Charkh Ab (Persian: چرخاب) may refer to:

- Charkhab, Kermanshah
- Char Khab, Yazd
