= Abarndabad Castle =

Castle in Yazd Province, Iran

- قلعه ابرندآباد
- Interactive map of the Abarndabad Castle area

General information
- Type: Castle
- Location: Yazd County, Iran
- Coordinates: 31°56′48.5″N 54°16′41.66″E

Abarndabad Castle (Persian: قلعه ابرندآباد) is a historical castle located in Yazd County in Yazd Province, The longevity of this fortress dates back to the Sasanian Empire.
