= Allahabad District (Zarach County) =

District in Yazd province, Iran

Allahabad District Persian: بخش اله‌آباد
- District
- Location within Iran
- Coordinates: 32°05′39″N 54°31′41″E
- Country: Iran
- Province: Yazd
- County: Zarach
- Capital: Darbid
- Time zone: UTC+3:30 (IRST)

Allahabad District (Persian: بخش اله‌آباد) is in Zarach County of Yazd province, Iran. Its capital is the village of Darbid, whose population at the time of the 2016 National Census was 299 in 92 households.

== History ==
In 2023, Zarach District (Note: Renamed the Central District of Zarach County) was separated from Yazd County in the establishment of Zarach County and renamed the Central District. The new county was divided into two districts and three rural districts, with Zarach as its capital and only city at the time.

== Demographics ==
=== Administrative divisions ===
Allahabad District
Administrative Divisions
Allahabad RD
Darbid RD
RD = Rural District
