= Abolghasem Wafi Yazdi =

Iranian Ayatollah

- ابوالقاسم وافی یزدی
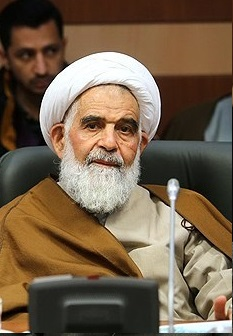

Member of Assembly of Experts
- Incumbent
- Assumed office 15 December 2006
- Preceded by: Seyed Abbas Khatam Yazdi
- Constituency: Yazd

Personal details
- Born: 29 September 1935 (age 91) Hoseynabad, Yazd
- Education: Qom Hawza

Ayatollah Abolghasem Wafi Yazdi (Persian: ابوالقاسم وافی یزدی), born in 1935, in Hoseynabad, Yazd, is a Shia cleric and member of the Assembly of Experts. He was also one of the representatives of the city of Yazd in the first and the second terms of the Islamic Consultative Assembly in Iran.

== Education ==
At the age of five, Wafi began to learn the Quran and then went to school and later to high school. Afterward, he went to the seminary in Yazd and completed the preliminary courses as well as some courses of "Sath" (meaning level or surface). In 1957, he went to Qom to further his studies at "Sath". Then he went to Qom seminary to study Kharij courses.

== Professors ==
Abolghasem Wafi met with many different teachers during his academic years including:

- Sheikh Ali Panah Ishtihardi
- Naser Makarem Shirazi
- Hossein Noori Hamedani
- Tabatabai Soltani
- Hussein-Ali Montazeri
- Reza Sadr
- Hossein Kazemeyni Boroujerdi
- Morteza Haeri Yazdi
- Ruhollah Khomeini
- Mostafa Mohaghegh Damad

== See also ==
- List of ayatollahs
- List of members in the Fourth Term of the Council of Experts
- List of members in the Fifth Term of the Council of Experts
