= Hamaneh =

Hamaneh (Persian: هامانه) may refer to:

- Hamaneh, Ardakan
- Hamaneh, Saduq
