= Akramabad Rural District =

Rural district in Yazd province, Iran

Akramabad Rural District Persian: دهستان اکرم‌آباد
- Rural District
- Location within Iran
- Coordinates: 31°55′10″N 54°30′00″E
- Country: Iran
- Province: Yazd
- County: Yazd
- District: Akramabad
- Capital: Akramabad
- Time zone: UTC+3:30 (IRST)

Akramabad Rural District (Persian: دهستان اکرم‌آباد) is in Akramabad District of Yazd County, Yazd province, Iran. Its capital is the village of Akramabad, whose population at the time of the 2016 National Census was 7,058 in 1,838 households.

== History ==
Akramabad Rural District was created in the new Akramabad District in 2023.
