= Dehnow Rural District (Yazd County) =

Rural district in Yazd province, Iran

Dehnow Rural District Persian: دهستان دهنو
- Rural District
- Location within Iran
- Coordinates: 31°48′39″N 54°26′26″E
- Country: Iran
- Province: Yazd
- County: Yazd
- District: Akramabad
- Capital: Deh Now
- Time zone: UTC+3:30 (IRST)

Dehnow Rural District (Persian: دهستان دهنو) is in Akramabad District of Yazd County, Yazd province, Iran. Its capital is the village of Deh Now, whose population at the time of the 2016 National Census was 3,821 in 1,075 households.

== History ==
Dehnow Rural District was created in the new Akramabad District in 2023.
