= Nadushan District =

District in Yazd province, Iran

Nadushan District Persian: بخش ندوشن
- District
- Location within Iran
- Coordinates: 31°57′28″N 53°24′07″E
- Country: Iran
- Province: Yazd
- County: Meybod
- Capital: Nadushan

Population (2016)
  - Total: 3,119
- Time zone: UTC+3:30 (IRST)

Nadushan District (Persian: بخش ندوشن) is in Meybod County, Yazd province, Iran. Its capital is the city of Nadushan.

== History ==
After the 2011 National Census, Nadushan Rural District and the city of Nadushan were separated from Khezrabad District of Ashkezar County (Note: Formerly Saduq County) in the formation of Nadushan District.

== Demographics ==
=== Population ===
At the time of the 2016 census, the district's population was 3,119 inhabitants in 1,027 households.

=== Administrative divisions ===
Nadushan District Population
Administrative Divisions	2016
Nadushan RD	216
Sadrabad RD	552
Nadushan (city)	2,351
Total	3,119
RD = Rural District
