= Fajr Rural District =

Fajr Rural District (Persian: دهستان فجر) may refer to:

- Fajr Rural District (Gonbad-e Kavus County), Golestan province
- Fajr Rural District (Yazd County), Yazd province
