= Majumard =

City in Yazd province, Iran

Majumard Persian: مجومرد
- City
- Location within Iran
- Coordinates: 32°01′23″N 54°12′04″E
- Country: Iran
- Province: Yazd
- County: Ashkezar
- District: Central
- Time zone: UTC+3:30 (IRST)

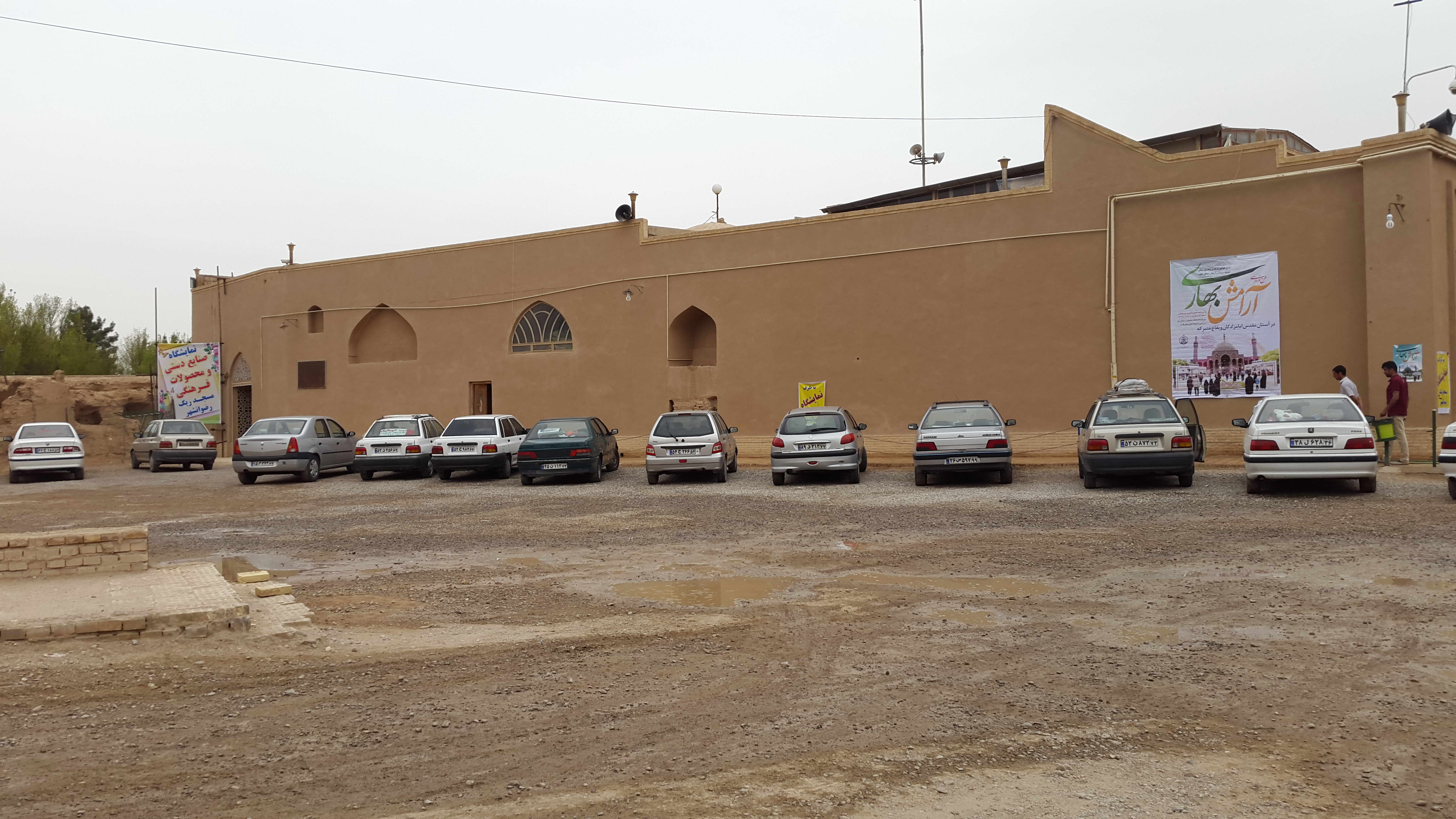

Majumard (Persian: مجومرد) (Note: Formerly the neighborhood of Rezvanshahr (رضوانشهر) in the city of Ashkezar) is a city in the Central District of Ashkezar County, (Note: Formerly Saduq County) Yazd province, Iran.

== History ==
In 2019, the Rezvanshahr neighborhood of Ashkezar was separated to form the new city of Majumard.
