= Khvorshidabad =

Khvorshidabad or Khowrshidabad (Persian: خورشيداباد) may refer to:

- Khvorshidabad, Ardabil
- Khvorshidabad, Mazandaran
- Khvorshidabad, Yazd
