= Fahraj Rural District =

Fahraj Rural District (Persian: دهستان فهرج) may refer to:

- Fahraj Rural District (Kerman Province)
- Fahraj Rural District (Yazd County), Yazd province
