= Ashkezar =

City in Yazd province, Iran

Ashkezar Persian: اشكذر
- City
- Location within Iran
- Coordinates: 31°59′59″N 54°12′27″E
- Country: Iran
- Province: Yazd
- County: Ashkezar
- District: Central

Population (2016)
  - Total: 19,123
- Time zone: UTC+3:30 (IRST)

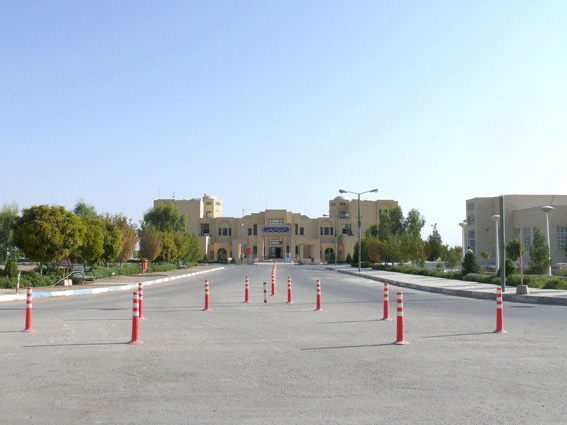
Azad University in Ashkezar

Ashkezar (Persian: اشكذر) (Note: Also romanized as Ashkaz̄ar and Ashkez̄ar; also known as Ash Kuzar, Ashk Dez, Āshkakzār, and Askīzār) is a city in the Central District of Ashkezar County, (Note: Formerly Saduq County) Yazd province, Iran, serving as capital of both the county and the district.

== Demographics ==
=== Population ===
At the time of the 2006 National Census, the city's population was 13,800 in 3,711 households. The following census in 2011 counted 15,663 people in 4,626 households. The 2016 census measured the population of the city as 19,123 people in 5,799 households.

In 2019, the Rezvanshahr neighborhood of Ashkezar was separated to form the new city of Majumard.
