= Mohammadabad Rural District (Zarach County) =

Rural district in Yazd province, Iran

Mohammadabad Rural District Persian: دهستان محمدآباد
- Rural District
- Location within Iran
- Coordinates: 31°57′13″N 54°13′15″E
- Country: Iran
- Province: Yazd
- County: Zarach
- District: Central
- Capital: Mohammadabad

Population (2016)
  - Total: 3,187
- Time zone: UTC+3:30 (IRST)

Mohammadabad Rural District (Persian: دهستان محمدآباد) is in the Central District (Note: Formerly Zarach District of Yazd County) of Zarach County, Yazd province, Iran. Its capital is the village of Mohammadabad.

== Demographics ==
=== Population ===
At the time of the 2006 National Census, the rural district's population (as a part of Zarach District (Note: Renamed the Central District of Zarach County) in Yazd County) was 1,782 in 434 households. There were 2,813 inhabitants in 740 households at the following census of 2011. The 2016 census measured the population of the rural district as 3,187 in 905 households. The most populous of its 18 villages was Mohammadabad, with 3,107 people.

In 2023, the district was separated from the county in the establishment of Zarach County and renamed the Central District.
