= Shahediyeh =

City in Yazd province, Iran

Shahediyeh Persian: شاهديه
- City
- Location within Iran
- Coordinates: 31°56′18″N 54°16′43″E
- Country: Iran
- Province: Yazd
- County: Yazd
- District: Central

Population (2016)
  - Total: 18,309
- Time zone: UTC+3:30 (IRST)

Shahediyeh (Persian: شاهديه) (Note: Also romanized as Shāhedīyeh) is a city in the Central District of Yazd County, Yazd province, Iran.

== Demographics ==
=== Population ===
At the time of the 2006 National Census, the city's population was 14,374 in 3,773 households. The following census in 2011 counted 16,571 people in 4,845 households. The 2016 census measured the population of the city as 18,309 people in 5,524 households.
