= Akramabad District =

District in Yazd province, Iran

Akramabad District Persian: بخش اکرم‌آباد
- District
- Location within Iran
- Coordinates: 31°55′10″N 54°30′05″E
- Country: Iran
- Province: Yazd
- County: Yazd
- Capital: Akramabad
- Time zone: UTC+3:30 (IRST)

Akramabad District (Persian: بخش اکرم‌آباد) is in Yazd County, Yazd province, Iran. Its capital is the village of Akramabad, whose population at the time of the 2016 National Census was 7,058 in 1,838 households.

== History ==
The district was formed in 2023 and divided into the new Akramabad and Dehnow Rural Districts.

== Demographics ==
=== Administrative divisions ===
Akramabad District
Administrative Divisions
Akramabad RD
Dehnow RD
RD = Rural District
