= Khezrabad =

City in Yazd province, Iran

Khezrabad Persian: خضرآباد
- City
- Location within Iran
- Coordinates: 31°51′58″N 53°57′07″E
- Country: Iran
- Province: Yazd
- County: Ashkezar
- District: Khezrabad

Population (2016)
  - Total: 535
- Time zone: UTC+3:30 (IRST)

Khezrabad (Persian: خضرآباد) (Note: Also romanized as Kheẕrābād and Khez̄rābād; also known as Khezr Abad Kazabat and Khezvābād) is a city and the capital of, Khezrabad District of Ashkezar County, (Note: Formerly Saduq County) Yazd province, Iran. It also serves as the administrative center for Kezab Rural District.

== Demographics ==
=== Population ===
At the time of the 2006 National Census, the city's population was 216 in 61 households. The following census in 2011 counted 581 people in 140 households. The 2016 census measured the population of the city as 535 people in 163 households.
