= Fajr Rural District (Yazd County) =

Rural district in Yazd province, Iran

Fajr Rural District Persian: دهستان فجر
- Rural District
- Location within Iran
- Coordinates: 31°48′06″N 54°19′40″E
- Country: Iran
- Province: Yazd
- County: Yazd
- District: Central
- Capital: Shahneh

Population (2016)
  - Total: 1,401
- Time zone: UTC+3:30 (IRST)

Fajr Rural District (Persian: دهستان فجر) is in the Central District of Yazd County, Yazd province, Iran. Its capital is the village of Shahneh. The previous capital of the rural district was the village of Kheyrabad.

== Demographics ==
=== Population ===
At the time of the 2006 National Census, the rural district's population was 12,158 in 3,256 households. There were 1,266 inhabitants in 321 households at the following census of 2011. The 2016 census measured the population of the rural district as 1,401 in 437 households. The most populous of its 47 villages was Shahneh, with 1,171 people.
