= Ezzahabad =

Ezzahabad عزه اباد
- Village
- Location within Iran
- Coordinates: 30°06′07″N 52°29′07″E
- Country: Iran
- Province: Fars
- County: Sepidan
- Bakhsh: Beyza
- Rural District: Banesh

Population (2006)
  - Total: 316
- Time zone: UTC+3:30 (IRST)
  - Summer (DST): UTC+4:30 (IRDT)

Ezzahabad (Persian: عزه اباد, also Romanized as 'Ezzahābād; also known as 'Ezzābād) is a village in Banesh Rural District, Beyza District, Sepidan County, Fars province, Iran. At the 2006 census, its population was 316, in 72 families.
