= Zarach, Iran =

City in Yazd province, Iran

Zarch Persian: زارچ
- City
- Location within Iran
- Coordinates: 31°59′27″N 54°13′55″E
- Country: Iran
- Province: Yazd
- County: Zarach
- District: Central

Population (2016)
  - Total: 11,691
- Time zone: UTC+3:30 (IRST)

Zarach (Persian: زارچ) (Note: Also romanized as Zarch and Zārch; also known as Zarej and Zārj) is a city in the Central District (Note: Formerly Zarach District of Yazd County) of Zarach County, Yazd province, Iran, serving as capital of both the county and the district.

The city is 5 km west of the city of Yazd. Zarach has the longest and oldest kariz in the world, with a length of 71 km and is over 3,000 years of age.

== Demographics ==
=== Population ===
At the time of the 2006 National Census, the city's population was 9,979 in 2,447 households, when it was in Zarach District (Note: Renamed the Central District of Zarach County) of Yazd County. The following census in 2011 counted 10,753 people in 2,858 households. The 2016 census measured the population of the city as 11,691 people in 3,388 households.

In 2023, the district was separated from the county in the establishment of Zarach County and renamed the Central District, with Zarach as the new county's capital.
