= Tamer =

Tamer is an Arabic and Turkish given name and surname.

It means "seller or merchandiser of dates" in Arabic. In Arabic, it is written as تامر. The name is more closely related to Tamr (as in dates) in old history, the Tamer gets the dates from dates palm trees and walks long distances to sell it to scattered trips in desert.

The Turkish name Tamer and the Arabic name Tamer are different from each other, they have different etymologies and meanings. Tamer means "perfect man" in Turkish and it is formed by combining the words "tam (full)" and "er (soldier, man)".

== Given name ==
- Tamer Ashour (born 1984), Egyptian singer and composer
- Tamer Balcı (1917–1993), Turkish actor
- Tamer Basar (born 1946), Turkish control theorist
- Tamer Başoğlu, (born 1938) Turkish sculptor
- Tamer Bayoumi (born 1982), Egyptian taekwondo practitioner
- Tamer El Said (born 1972), Egyptian film director, producer, and writer
- Tamer El-Sawy (born 1972), Egyptian tennis player
- Tamer Fernandes (born 1974), English football player
- Tamer Hamed (born 1974), Egyptian swimmer
- Tamer Abdel Hamid (born 1975), Egyptian footballer
- Tamer Hassan (born 1968), English actor of Turkish Cypriot descent
- Tamer Hosny (born 1977), Egyptian singer-songwriter
- Tamer Karadağlı (born 1967), Turkish actor
- Tamer Moustafa (born 1982), Egyptian basketball player
- Tamer Nafar (born 1979), Arab-Israeli rapper
- Tamer Oyguç (born 1966), Turkish professional basketball player
- Tamer Peker (born 1970), Turkish operatic baritone
- Tamer Seckin, American gynecologist and laparoscopic surgeon
- Tamer Mohamed Tahoun (born 1977), Egyptian fencer
- Tamer Tuna (footballer, born 1976), Turkish football coach and former player
- Tamer Tuna (footballer, born 1991), Turkish footballer
- Tamer Yiğit (born Tamer Özyiğitoğlu in 1942), Turkish actor

== Surname ==
- Chris Tamer (born 1970), American ice hockey player
- Georges Tamer, professor of philology and Arabic and Islamic studies
- Kandy Tamer (born 1972), Australian-born rugby league player of Lebanese origin
- Taleedah Tamer, Saudi Arabian fashion model
- Tony Tamer (born 1957), American businessman, founder and Co-CEO of H.I.G. Capital
- Zakaria Tamer (born 1931), Syrian short story writer

== See also ==
- Michel Temer (born 1940), Brazilian politician of Lebanese descent, former president of Brazil
- Marcela Temer (born 1983), wife of Michel Temer
- Monte Tamer, a mountain in Italy
