= Atabak, Fars =

Atabak اتابك
- Village
- Location within Iran
- Coordinates: 29°39′48″N 52°56′03″E
- Country: Iran
- Province: Fars
- County: Shiraz
- Bakhsh: Zarqan
- Rural District: Band-e Amir

Population (2006)
  - Total: 396
- Time zone: UTC+3:30 (IRST)
  - Summer (DST): UTC+4:30 (IRDT)

Atabak (Persian: اتابك, also Romanized as Atābak; also known as Atābak-e Karbāl) is a village in Band-e Amir Rural District, Zarqan District, Shiraz County, Fars province, Iran. At the 2006 census, its population was 396, in 97 families.
