= Charkhab, Kermanshah =

Charkhab چرخاب
- Village
- Location within Iran
- Coordinates: 34°23′49″N 47°40′12″E
- Country: Iran
- Province: Kermanshah
- County: Sahneh
- Bakhsh: Central
- Rural District: Gamasiyab

Population (2006)
  - Total: 144
- Time zone: UTC+3:30 (IRST)
  - Summer (DST): UTC+4:30 (IRDT)

Charkhab (Persian: چرخاب, also Romanized as Charkhāb) is a village in Gamasiyab Rural District, in the Central District of Sahneh County, Kermanshah Province, Iran. At the 2006 census, its population was 144, in 32 families.
