= Nadushan =

City in Yazd province, Iran

Nadushan Persian: ندوشن
- City
- Location within Iran
- Coordinates: 32°01′23″N 53°32′46″E
- Country: Iran
- Province: Yazd
- County: Meybod
- District: Nadushan

Population (2016)
  - Total: 2,351
- Time zone: UTC+3:30 (IRST)

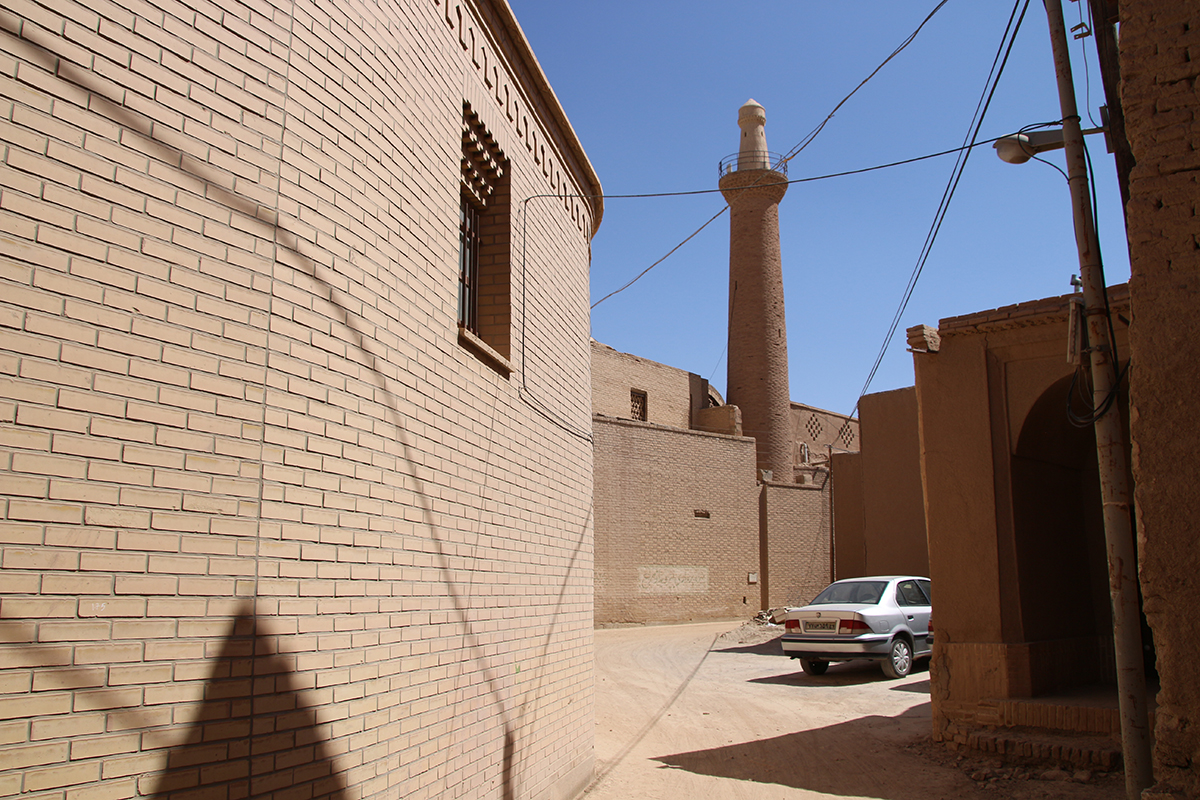
Sofla Hussainiya (left), Jameh Mosque of Nadushan (center)

Nadushan (Persian: ندوشن; /nəˌduːˈʃæn/) (Note: Also romanized as Nedoushan (in local dialect)) is a city in, and the capital of, Nadushan District of Meybod County, Yazd province, Iran. It also serves as the administrative center for Nadushan Rural District. The village of Nadushan was elevated to the status of a city in 1997.

The city is in a mountainous region where many people live on farms and have fruit gardens. Historically, many of the inhabitants are believed to be Zoroastrians.

== Demographics ==
=== Population ===
At the time of the 2006 National Census, the city's population was 2,351 in 650 households, when it was in Khezrabad District of Ashkezar County. (Note: Formerly Saduq County) The following census in 2011 counted 2,332 people in 718 households. The 2016 census measured the population of the city as 2,351 people in 791 households, by which time the city had been separated from the county in the establishment of Nadushan District of Meybod County.
