= Rostaq Rural District (Ashkezar County) =

Rural district in Yazd province, Iran

Rostaq Rural District Persian: دهستان رستاق
- Rural District
- Location within Iran
- Coordinates: 32°04′47″N 54°12′56″E
- Country: Iran
- Province: Yazd
- County: Ashkezar
- District: Central
- Capital: Sadrabad

Population (2016)
  - Total: 8,896
- Time zone: UTC+3:30 (IRST)

Rostaq Rural District (Persian: دهستان رستاق) is in the Central District of Ashkezar County, (Note: Formerly Saduq County) Yazd province, Iran. Its capital is the village of Sadrabad.

== Demographics ==
=== Population ===
At the time of the 2006 National Census, the rural district's population was 8,400 in 2,326 households. There were 9,046 inhabitants in 2,704 households at the following census of 2011. The 2016 census measured the population of the rural district as 8,896 in 2,774 households. The most populous of its 41 villages was Ebrahimabad, with 1,509 people.
