= Sadrabad, Kazerun =

Sadrabad صدراباد
- Village
- Location within Iran
- Coordinates: 29°43′34″N 51°33′40″E
- Country: Iran
- Province: Fars
- County: Kazerun
- Bakhsh: Central
- Rural District: Deris

Population (2006)
  - Total: 296
- Time zone: UTC+3:30 (IRST)
  - Summer (DST): UTC+4:30 (IRDT)

Sadrabad (Persian: صدراباد, also Romanized as Şadrābād) is a village in Deris Rural District, in the Central District of Kazerun County, Fars province, Iran. At the 2006 census, its population was 296, in 72 families.
