= Ezzabad, Marvdasht =

Ezzabad عزاباد
- Village
- Location within Iran
- Coordinates: 29°52′16″N 52°57′31″E
- Country: Iran
- Province: Fars
- County: Marvdasht
- Bakhsh: Central
- Rural District: Mohammadabad

Population (2006)
  - Total: 678
- Time zone: UTC+3:30 (IRST)
  - Summer (DST): UTC+4:30 (IRDT)

Ezzabad (Persian: عزاباد, also Romanized as 'Ezzābād; also known as 'Ez Abad Marvdasht and 'Ezzābād-e Marvdasht) is a village in Mohammadabad Rural District, in the Central District of Marvdasht County, Fars province, Iran. At the 2006 census, its population was 678, in 168 families.
