= Eyshabad, Rafsanjan =

Eyshabad عيش اباد
- Village
- Location within Iran
- Coordinates: 30°27′57″N 55°58′45″E
- Country: Iran
- Province: Kerman
- County: Rafsanjan
- Bakhsh: Central
- Rural District: Azadegan

Population (2006)
  - Total: 1,112
- Time zone: UTC+3:30 (IRST)
  - Summer (DST): UTC+4:30 (IRDT)

Eyshabad (Persian: عيش اباد, also Romanized as ‘Eyshābād and ‘Aishābād; also known as Gūrābād and ‘Isáābād) is a village in Azadegan Rural District, in the Central District of Rafsanjan County, Kerman Province, Iran. At the 2006 census, its population was 1,112, in 280 families.
