= Hamidiya =

City in Yazd province, Iran

Hamidiya Persian: حمیدیا
- City
- Location within Iran
- Coordinates: 31°49′27″N 54°23′39″E
- Country: Iran
- Province: Yazd
- County: Yazd
- District: Central

Population (2016)
  - Total: 51,793
- Time zone: UTC+3:30 (IRST)

Hamidiya (Persian: حمیدیا) (Note: Also romanized as Ḩamīdīyā; also known as Shahr-e Ḩamīdīyā) is a city in the Central District of Yazd County, Yazd province, Iran.

== Demographics ==
=== Population ===
At the time of the 2006 National Census, the city's population was 27,611 in 7,252 households. The following census in 2011 counted 37,428 people in 10,736 households. The 2016 census measured the population of the city as 51,793 people in 15,268 households.
