= Eyshabad, Balvard =

Eyshabad عيش اباد
- Village
- Location within Iran
- Coordinates: 29°27′54″N 56°01′16″E
- Country: Iran
- Province: Kerman
- County: Sirjan
- Bakhsh: Central
- Rural District: Balvard

Population (2006)
  - Total: 11
- Time zone: UTC+3:30 (IRST)
  - Summer (DST): UTC+4:30 (IRDT)

Eyshabad (Persian: عيش اباد, also Romanized as ʿEyshābād and Ayshabad) is a village in Balvard Rural District, in the Central District of Sirjan County, Kerman Province, Iran. At the 2006 census, its population was 11, in 4 families.
