= Eyshabad-e Nizeh =

Eyshabad-e Nizeh عيش اباد نيزه
- Village
- Location within Iran
- Coordinates: 36°18′23″N 59°41′22″E
- Country: Iran
- Province: Razavi Khorasan
- County: Mashhad
- Bakhsh: Central
- Rural District: Kenevist

Population (2006)
  - Total: 112
- Time zone: UTC+3:30 (IRST)
  - Summer (DST): UTC+4:30 (IRDT)

Eyshabad-e Nizeh (Persian: عيش اباد نيزه, also Romanized as ‘Eyshābād-e Nīzeh; also known as ‘Eyshābād) is a village in Kenevist Rural District, in the Central District of Mashhad County, Razavi Khorasan Province, Iran. At the 2006 census, its population was 112, in 30 families.
