= Zarach County =

County in Yazd province, Iran

Zarach County Persian: شهرستان زارچ
- County
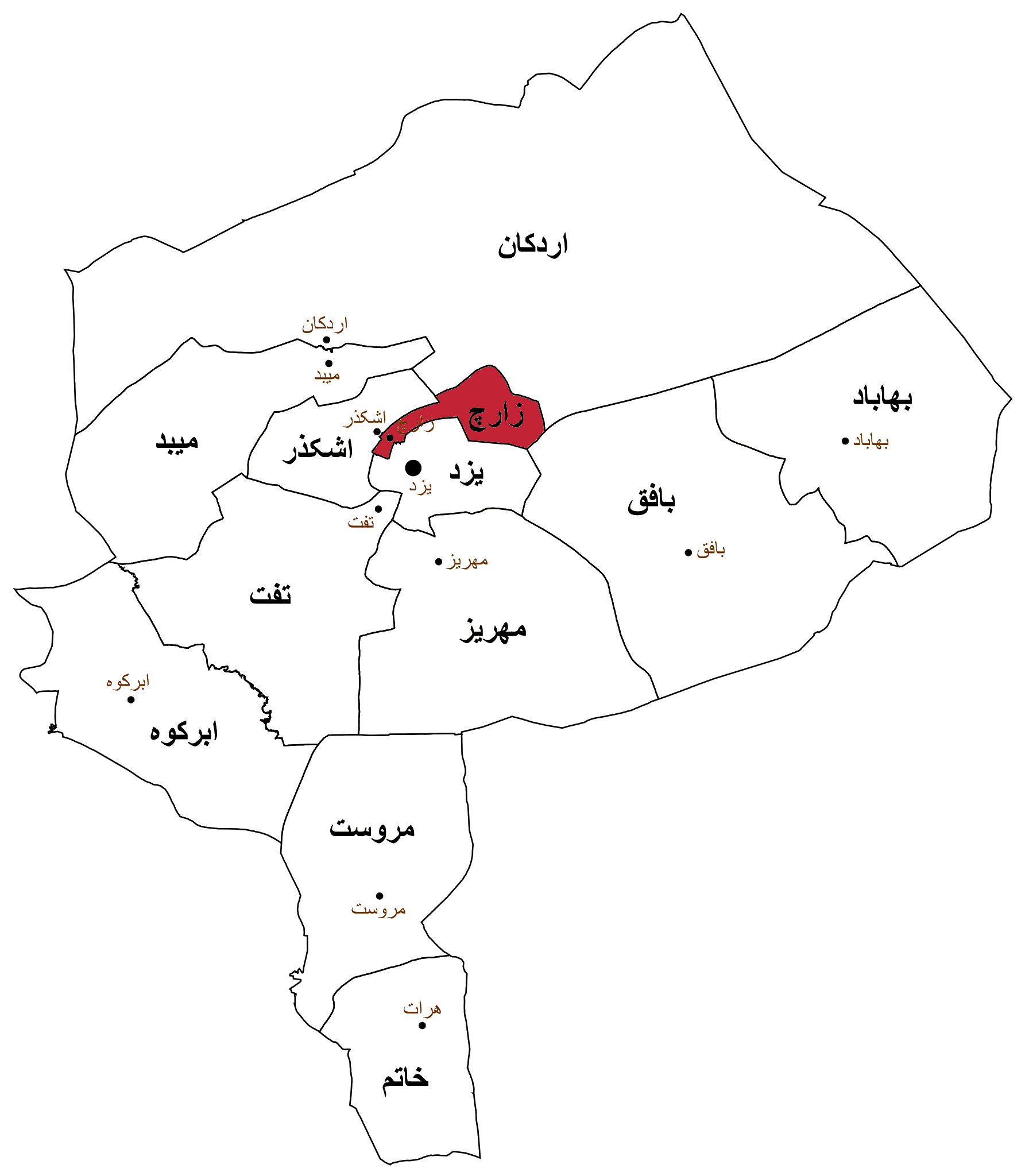
- Location of Zarach County in Yazd province

- Location of Yazd province in Iran
- Coordinates: 32°04′34″N 54°30′49″E
- Country: Iran
- Province: Yazd
- Capital: Zarach
- Districts: Central, Allahabad
- Time zone: UTC+3:30 (IRST)

Zarach County (Persian: شهرستان زارچ) is in Yazd province, Iran. Its capital is the city of Zarach, whose population at the time of the 2016 National Census was 11,691 in 3,388 households.

== History ==
In 2023, Zarach District (Note: Renamed the Central District of Zarach County) was separated from Yazd County in the establishment of Zarach County and renamed the Central District. The new county was divided into two districts and three rural districts, with Zarach as its capital and only city at the time.

== Demographics ==
=== Administrative divisions ===
Zarach County's administrative structure is shown in the following table.

Zarach County
Administrative Divisions
Central District (Note: Formerly Zarach District of Yazd County)
Mohammadabad RD
Zarach (city)
Allahabad District
Allahabad RD
Darbid RD
RD = Rural District

== See also ==
Media related to Zarch County at Wikimedia Commons
