= Central District (Ashkezar County) =

District in Yazd province, Iran

Central District (Ashkezar County) Persian: بخش مرکزی شهرستان اشکذر
- District
- Location within Iran
- Coordinates: 32°04′47″N 54°12′56″E
- Country: Iran
- Province: Yazd
- County: Ashkezar
- Capital: Ashkezar

Population (2016)
  - Total: 28,019
- Time zone: UTC+3:30 (IRST)

The Central District of Ashkezar County (Note: Formerly Saduq County) (Persian: بخش مرکزی شهرستان اشکذر) is in Yazd province, Iran. Its capital is the city of Ashkezar..

== History ==
In 2019, the Rezvanshahr neighborhood of Ashkezar was separated to form the new city of Majumard.

== Demographics ==
=== Population ===
At the time of the 2006 National Census, the district's population was 22,200 in 6,037 households. The following census in 2011 counted 24,709 people in 7,330 households. The 2016 census measured the population of the district as 28,019 inhabitants in 8,573 households.

=== Administrative divisions ===
Central District (Ashkezar County) Population
Administrative Divisions	2006	2011	2016
Rostaq RD	8,400	9,046	8,896
Ashkezar (city)	13,800	15,663	19,123
Majumard (city) (Note: Formerly Rezvanshahr neighborhood; became a city after the 2016 census)			
Total	22,200	24,709	28,019
RD = Rural District
