= Nadushan Rural District =

Rural district in Yazd province, Iran

Nadushan Rural District Persian: دهستان ندوشن
- Rural District
- Location within Iran
- Coordinates: 32°04′42″N 53°24′12″E
- Country: Iran
- Province: Yazd
- County: Meybod
- District: Nadushan
- Capital: Nadushan

Population (2016)
  - Total: 216
- Time zone: UTC+3:30 (IRST)

Nadushan Rural District (Persian: دهستان ندوشن) is in Nadushan District of Meybod County, Yazd province, Iran. It is administered from the city of Nadushan.

== Demographics ==
=== Population ===
At the time of the 2006 National Census, the rural district's population (as a part of Khezrabad District, Ashkezar County) (Note: Formerly Saduq County) was 1,048 in 360 households. There were 1,372 inhabitants in 450 households at the following census of 2011. The 2016 census measured the population of the rural district as 216 in 68 households, by which time the rural district had been separated from the county in the establishment of Nadushan District of Meybod County. The most populous of its 44 villages was Neyuk-e Sofla, with 112 people.
