= Fahraj Rural District (Yazd County) =

Rural district in Yazd province, Iran

Fahraj Rural District Persian: دهستان فهرج
- Rural District
- Location within Iran
- Coordinates: 31°48′48″N 54°37′00″E
- Country: Iran
- Province: Yazd
- County: Yazd
- District: Central
- Capital: Mohammadabad

Population (2016)
  - Total: 34,511
- Time zone: UTC+3:30 (IRST)

Fahraj Rural District (Persian: دهستان فهرج) is in the Central District of Yazd County, Yazd province, Iran. Its capital is the village of Mohammadabad.

== Demographics ==
=== Population ===
At the time of the 2006 National Census, the rural district's population was 22,659 in 5,303 households. There were 22,708 inhabitants in 6,207 households at the following census of 2011. The 2016 census measured the population of the rural district as 34,511 in 9,696 households. The most populous of its 14 villages was Chah Akrami, with 10,311 people.
