= Kezab Rural District =

Rural district in Yazd province, Iran

Kezab Rural District Persian: دهستان كذاب
- Rural District
- Location within Iran
- Coordinates: 31°56′48″N 53°57′11″E
- Country: Iran
- Province: Yazd
- County: Ashkezar
- District: Khezrabad
- Capital: Khezrabad

Population (2016)
  - Total: 4,012
- Time zone: UTC+3:30 (IRST)

Kezab Rural District (Persian: دهستان كذاب) is in Khezrabad District of Ashkezar County, (Note: Formerly Saduq County) Yazd province, Iran. It is administered from the city of Khezrabad.

== Demographics ==
=== Population ===
At the time of the 2006 National Census, the rural district's population was 2,257 in 701 households. There were 4,198 inhabitants in 1,086 households at the following census of 2011. The 2016 census measured the population of the rural district as 4,012 in 877 households. The most populous of its 108 villages was Hamaneh, with 377 people.
