= Central District (Yazd County) =

District in Yazd province, Iran

Central District (Yazd County) Persian: بخش مرکزی شهرستان یزد
- District
- Location within Iran
- Coordinates: 31°51′27″N 54°29′37″E
- Country: Iran
- Province: Yazd
- County: Yazd
- Capital: Yazd

Population (2016)
  - Total: 635,687
- Time zone: UTC+3:30 (IRST)

The Central District of Yazd County (Persian: بخش مرکزی شهرستان یزد) is in Yazd province, Iran. Its capital is the city of Yazd.

== Demographics ==
=== Population ===
At the time of the 2006 National Census, the district's population was 499,808 in 134,300 households. The following census in 2011 counted 564,125 people in 163,681 households. The 2016 census measured the population of the district as 635,687 inhabitants in 189,293 households.

=== Administrative divisions ===
Central District (Yazd County) Population
Administrative Divisions	2006	2011	2016
Fahraj RD	22,659	22,708	34,511
Fajr RD	12,158	1,266	1,401
Hamidiya (city)	27,611	37,428	51,793
Shahediyeh (city)	14,374	16,571	18,309
Yazd (city)	423,006	486,152	529,673
Total	499,808	564,125	635,687
RD = Rural District
