= Allahabad Rural District =

Rural district in Yazd province, Iran

Allahabad Rural District Persian: دهستان اله آباد
- Rural District
- Location within Iran
- Coordinates: 32°02′45″N 54°22′00″E
- Country: Iran
- Province: Yazd
- County: Zarach
- District: Allahabad
- Capital: Allahabad

Population (2016)
  - Total: 5,908
- Time zone: UTC+3:30 (IRST)

Allahabad Rural District (Persian: دهستان اله آباد) is in Allahabad District of Zarach County, Yazd province, Iran. Its capital is the village of Allahabad.

== Demographics ==
=== Population ===
At the time of the 2006 National Census, the rural district's population (as a part of Zarach District (Note: Renamed the Central District of Zarach County) in Yazd County) was 3,475 in 927 households. There were 4,991 inhabitants in 1,249 households at the following census of 2011. The 2016 census measured the population of the rural district as 5,908 in 1,547 households. The most populous of its 38 villages was Allahabad, with 5,573 people.

In 2023, the district was separated from the county in the establishment of Zarach County and renamed the Central District. The rural district was transferred to the new Allahabad District.
