= Central District (Zarach County) =

District in Yazd province, Iran

Central District (Zarach County) Persian: بخش مرکزی شهرستان زارچ
- District
- Location within Iran
- Coordinates: 31°57′13″N 54°13′15″E
- Country: Iran
- Province: Yazd
- County: Zarach
- Capital: Zarach

Population (2016)
  - Total: 20,786 (Note: As Zarach District of Yazd County)
- Time zone: UTC+3:30 (IRST)

The Central District of Zarach County (Persian: بخش مرکزی شهرستان زارچ) (Note: Formerly Zarach District (بخش زارچ) of Yazd County) is in Yazd province, Iran. Its capital is the city of Zarach.

== History ==
In 2023, Zarach District (Note: Renamed the Central District of Zarach County) was separated from Yazd County in the establishment of Zarach County and renamed the Central District. The new county was divided into two districts and three rural districts, with Zarach as its capital and only city at the time.

== Demographics ==
At the time of the 2006 National Census, the district's population (as Zarach District ion Yazd County) was 15,236 in 927 households. The following census in 2011 counted 18,557 people in 4,847 households. The 2016 census measured the population of the district as 20,786 inhabitants in 5,840 households.

=== Administrative divisions ===
Central District (Zarach County) (Note: As Zarach District of Yazd County at the 2006, 2011, and 2016 censuses)
Administrative Divisions	2006	2011	2016
Allahabad RD (Note: Transferred to Allahabad District after the 2016 census)	3,475	4,991	5,908
Mohammadabad RD	1,782	2,813	3,187
Zarach (city)	9,979	10,753	11,691
Total	15,236	18,557	20,786
RD = Rural District
