= Khezrabad District =

District in Yazd province, Iran

Khezrabad District Persian: بخش خضرآباد
- District
- Location within Iran
- Coordinates: 31°56′48″N 53°57′11″E
- Country: Iran
- Province: Yazd
- County: Ashkezar
- Capital: Khezrabad

Population (2016)
  - Total: 4,547
- Time zone: UTC+3:30 (IRST)

Khezrabad District (Persian: بخش خضرآباد) is in Ashkezar County, (Note: Formerly Saduq County) Yazd province, Iran. Its capital is the city of Khezrabad.

== History ==
After the 2011 National Census, Nadushan Rural District and the city of Nadushan were separated from the district to join Meybod County.

== Demographics ==
=== Population ===
At the time of the 2006 census, the district's population was 5,872 in 1,772 households. The following census in 2011 counted 8,483 people in 2,394 households. The 2016 census measured the population of the district as 4,547 inhabitants in 1,040 households.

=== Administrative divisions ===
Khezrabad District Population
Administrative Divisions	2006	2011	2016
Kezab RD	2,257	4,198	4,012
Nadushan RD (Note: Transferred to Meybod County)	1,048	1,372	
Khezrabad (city)	216	581	535
Nadushan (city)	2,351	2,332	
Total	5,872	8,483	4,547
RD = Rural District
