= Ashkezar County =

County in Yazd province, Iran

Ashkezar County Persian: شهرستان اشكذر
- County
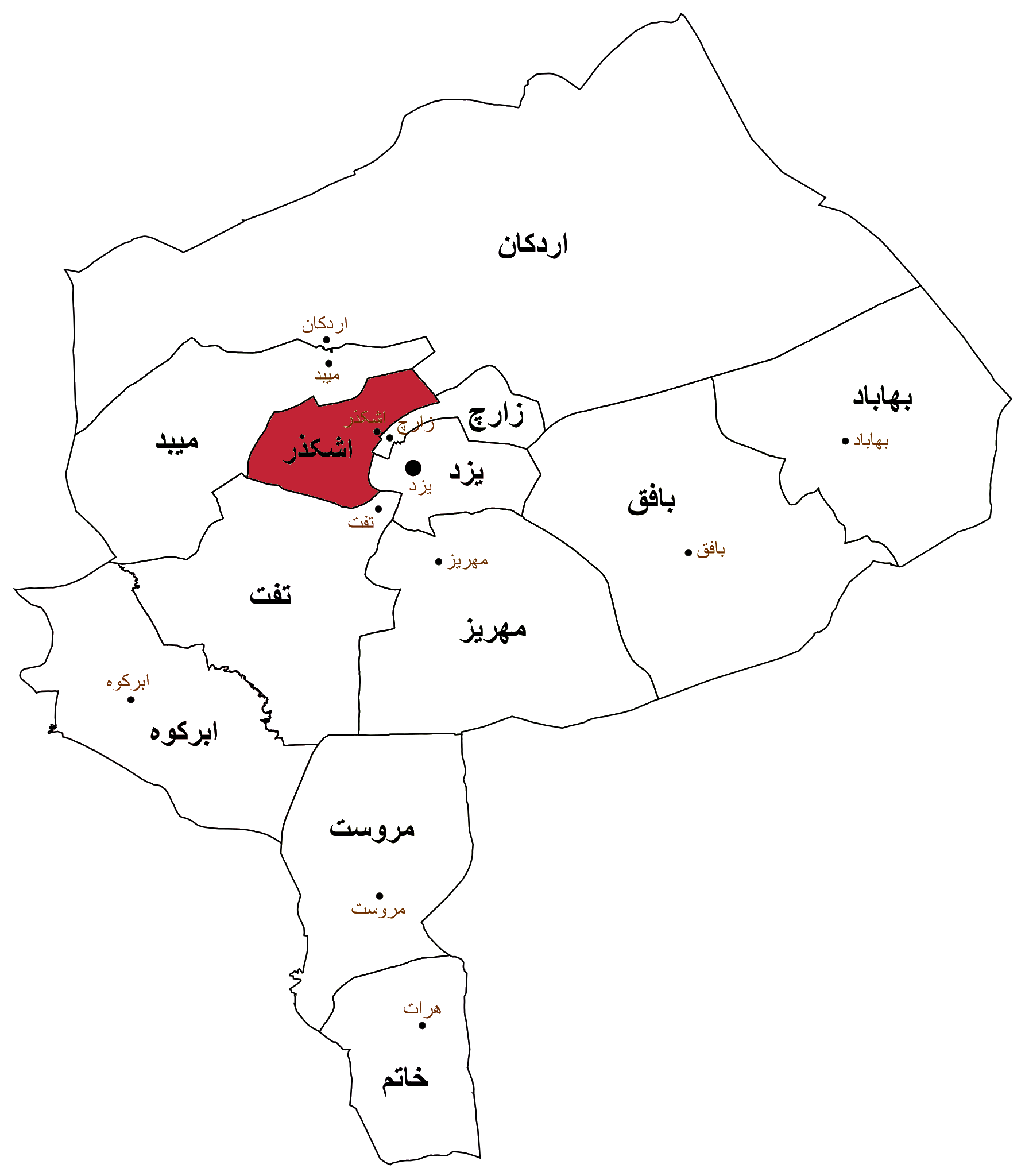
- Location of Ashkezar County in Yazd province

- Location of Yazd province in Iran
- Coordinates: 32°00′N 54°04′E
- Country: Iran
- Province: Yazd
- Capital: Ashkezar
- Districts: Central, Khezrabad

Population (2016)
  - Total: 32,566
- Time zone: UTC+3:30 (IRST)

Ashkezar County (Persian: شهرستان اشكذر) (Note: Formerly Saduq County (شهرستان صدوق)) is in Yazd province, Iran. Its capital is the city of Ashkezar.

== History ==
After the 2011 National Census, Nadushan Rural District and the city of Nadushan were separated from the county to join Meybod County. In 2019, the Rezvanshahr neighborhood of Ashkezar was separated to form the new city of Majumard.

== Demographics ==
=== Population ===
At the time of the 2006 census, the county's population was 28,072 in 7,809 households. The following census in 2011 counted 33,192 people in 9,699 households. The 2016 census measured the population of the county as 32,566 in 9,613 households.

=== Administrative divisions ===
Ashkezar County's population history and administrative structure over three consecutive censuses are shown in the following table.

Ashkezar County Population
Administrative Divisions	2006	2011	2016
Central District	22,200	24,709	28,019
Rostaq RD	8,400	9,046	8,896
Ashkezar (city)	13,800	15,663	19,123
Majumard (city) (Note: Formerly Rezvanshahr neighborhood; became a city after the 2016 census)			
Khezrabad District	5,872	8,483	4,547
Kezab RD	2,257	4,198	4,012
Nadushan RD (Note: Transferred to Meybod County)	1,048	1,372	
Khezrabad (city)	216	581	535
Nadushan (city)	2,351	2,332	
Total	28,072	33,192	32,566
RD = Rural District

== See also ==
Media related to Ashkezar County at Wikimedia Commons
