= Yazd County =

County in Yazd province, Iran

Yazd County Persian: شهرستان یزد
- County
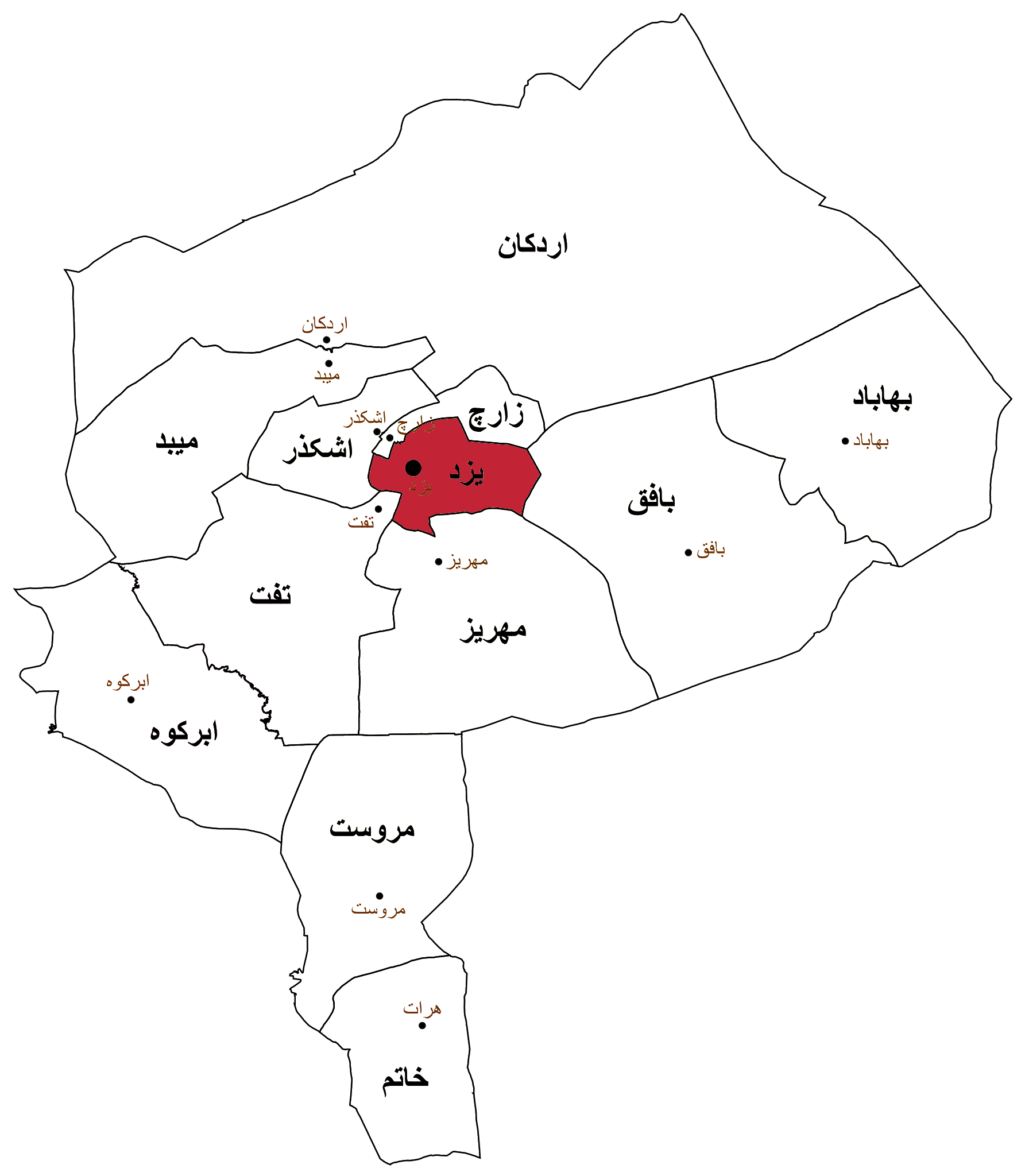
- Location of Yazd County in Yazd province

- Location of Yazd province in Iran
- Coordinates: 31°53′00″N 54°29′30″E
- Country: Iran
- Province: Yazd
- Capital: Yazd
- Districts: Central, Zarach

Population (2016)
  - Total: 656,474
- Time zone: UTC+3:30 (IRST)

Yazd County (Persian: شهرستان یزد) is in Yazd province, Iran. Its capital is the city of Yazd.

== History ==
In 2023, Akramabad District was formed in the county and divided into Akramabad and Dehnow Rural Districts. Zarach District (Note: Renamed the Central District of Zarach County) was separated from the county in the establishment of Zarach County and renamed the Central District.

== Demographics ==
=== Population ===
At the time of the 2006 National Census, the county's population was 515,044 in 138,108 households. The following census in 2011 counted 582,682 people in 168,458 households. The 2016 census measured the population of the county as 656,474 in 195,134 households.

=== Administrative divisions ===
Yazd County's population history and administrative structure over three consecutive censuses are shown in the following table.

Yazd County Population
Administrative Divisions	2006	2011	2016
Central District	499,808	564,125	635,687
Fahraj RD	22,659	22,708	34,511
Fajr RD	12,158	1,266	1,401
Hamidiya (city)	27,611	37,428	51,793
Shahediyeh (city)	14,374	16,571	18,309
Yazd (city)	423,006	486,152	529,673
Akramabad District (Note: Established after the 2016 census)			
Akramabad RD			
Dehnow RD			
Zarach District (Note: Transferred to Zarach County after the 2016 census and renamed the Central District)	15,236	18,557	20,786
Allahabad RD	3,475	4,991	5,908
Mohammadabad RD	1,782	2,813	3,187
Zarach (city)	9,979	10,753	11,691
Total	515,044	582,682	656,474
RD = Rural District

== See also ==
Media related to Yazd County at Wikimedia Commons
