= Yazd province =

Province of Iran

Yazd Province استان یزد (Persian)
- Province
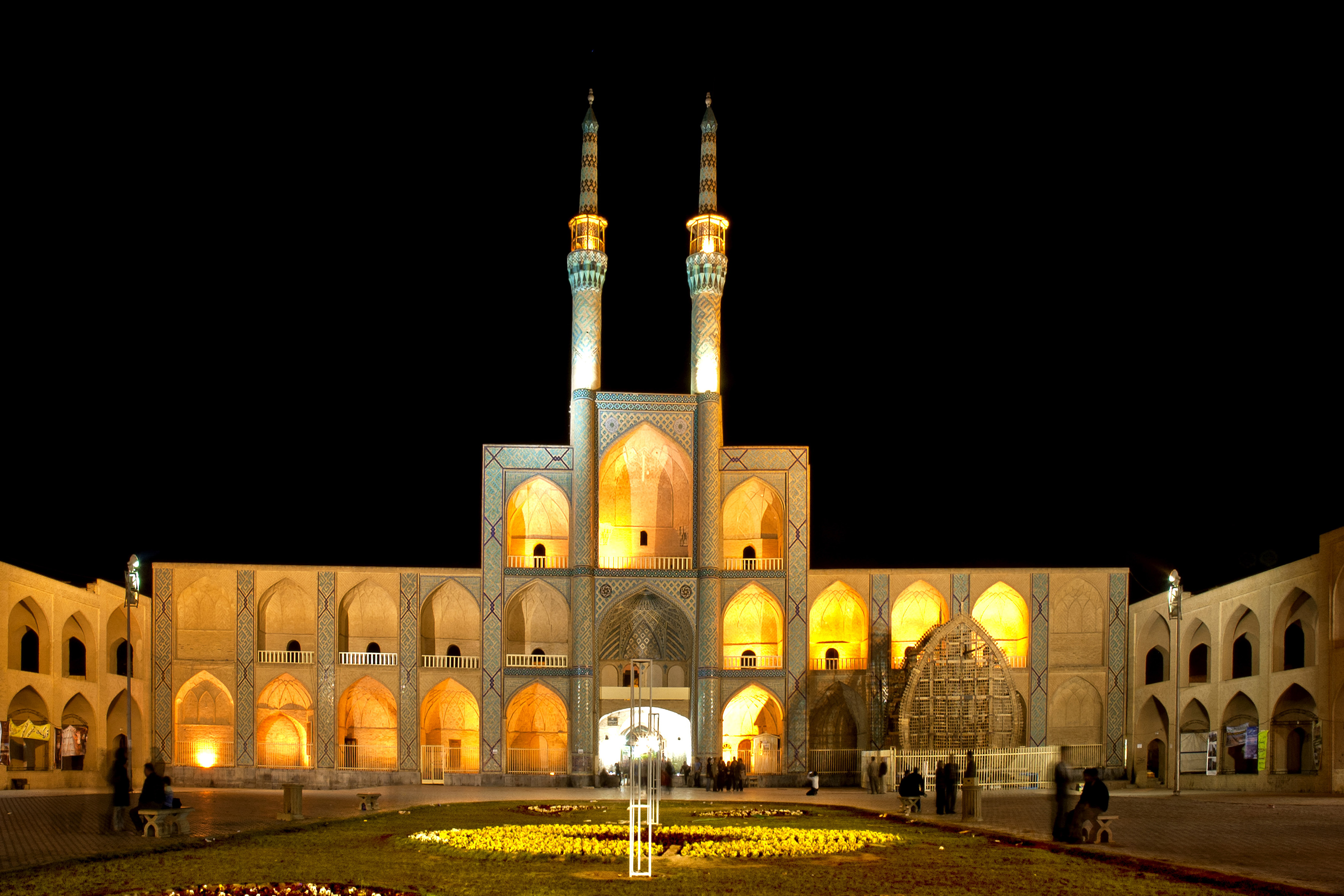
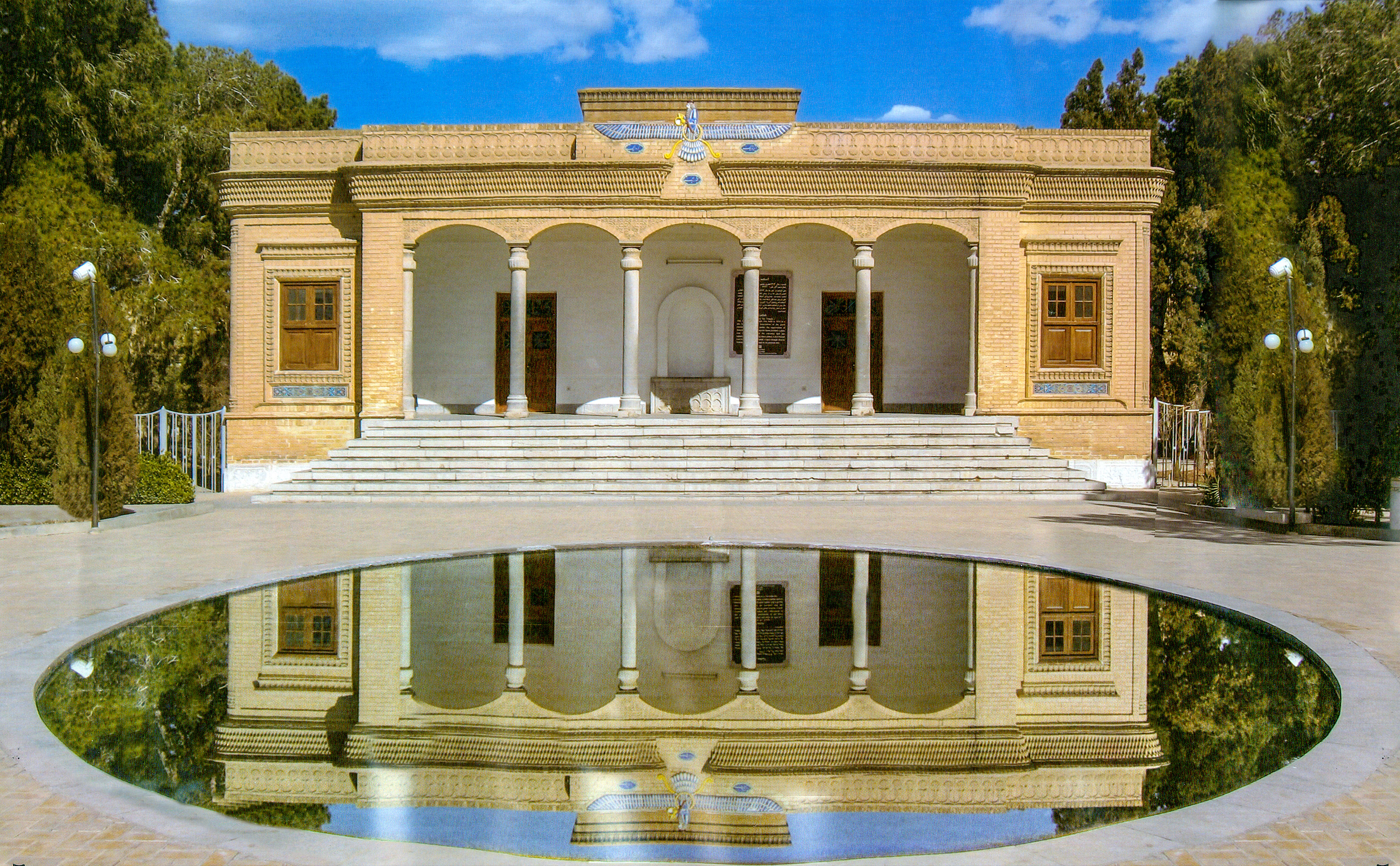
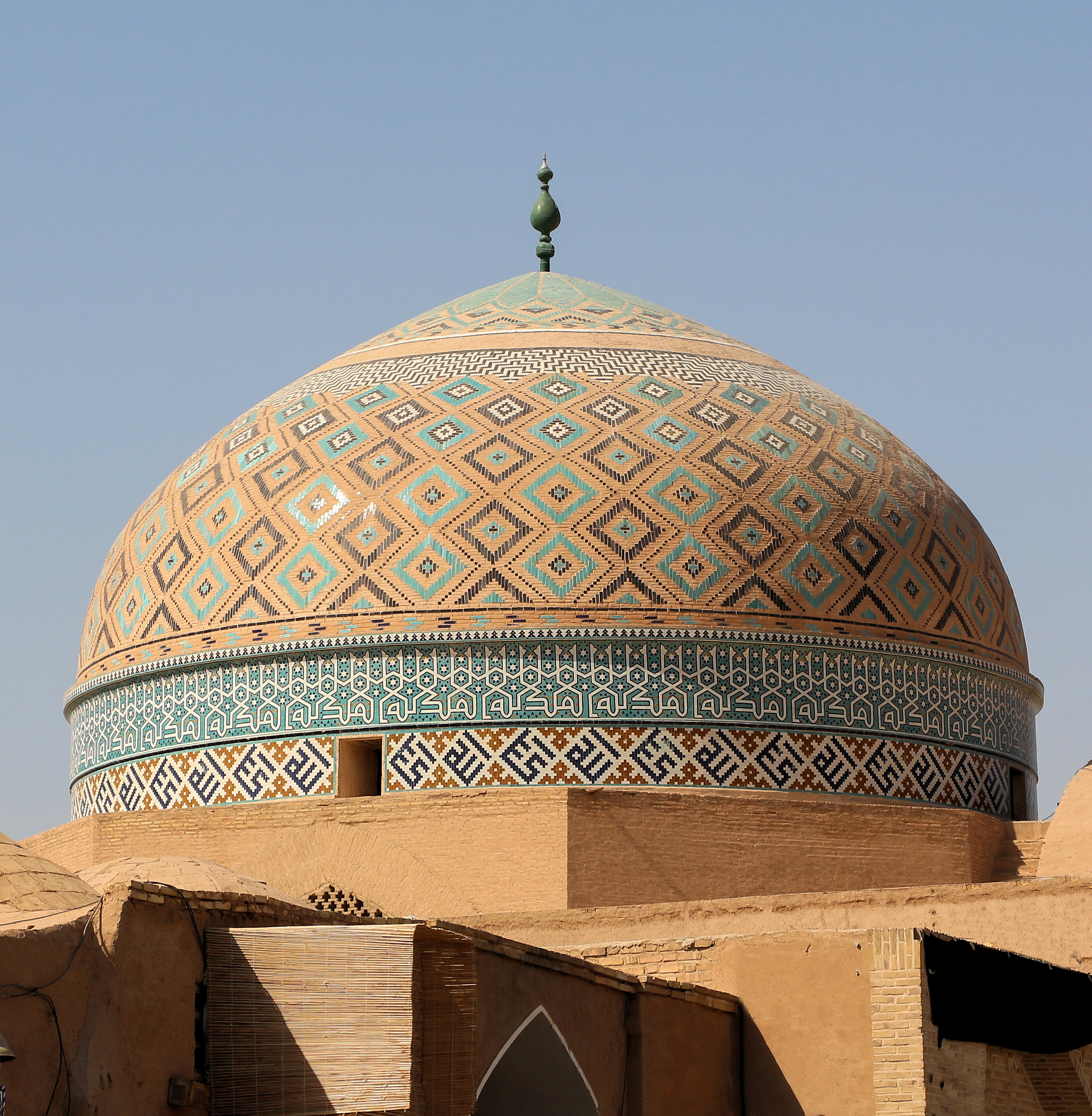
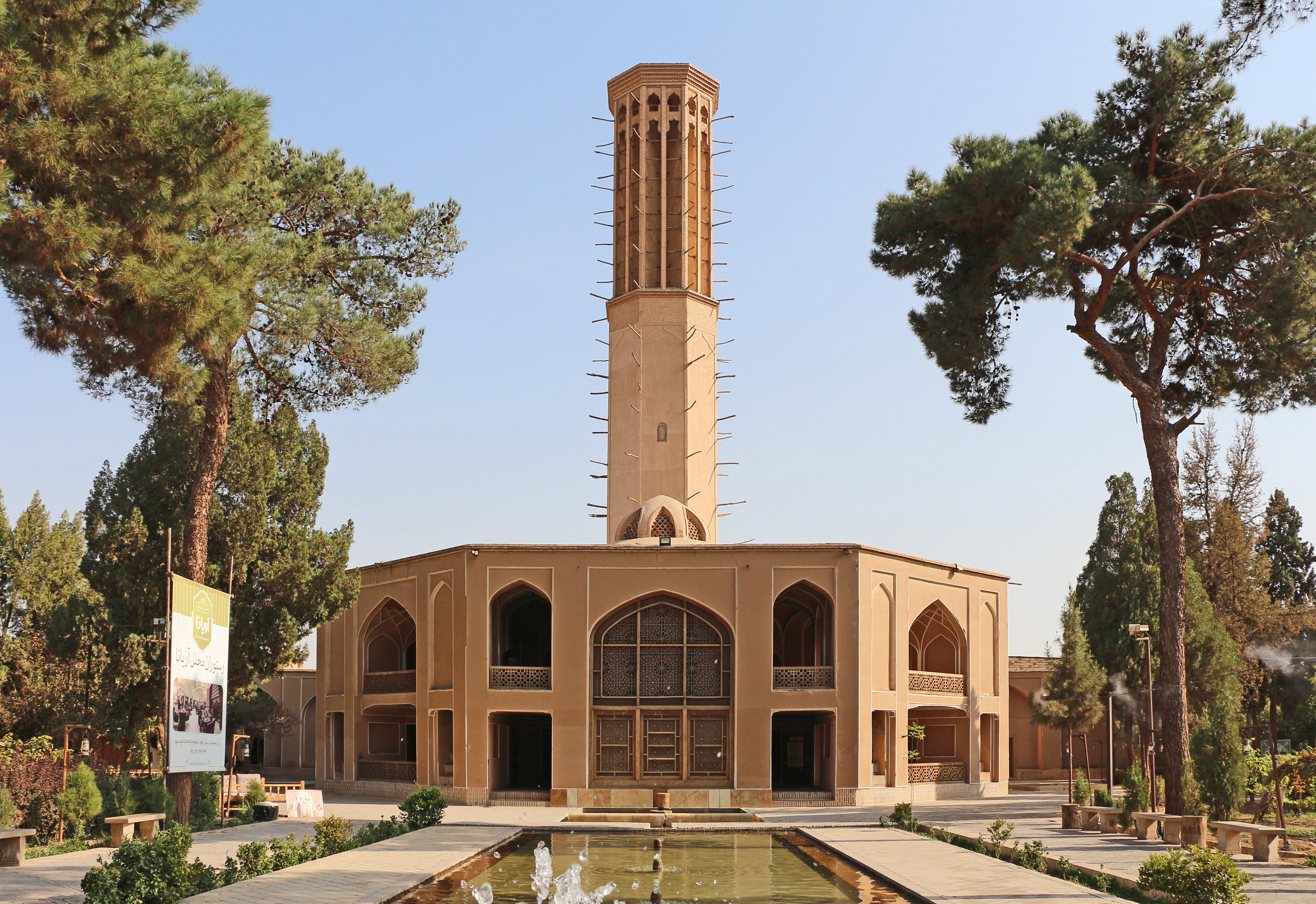
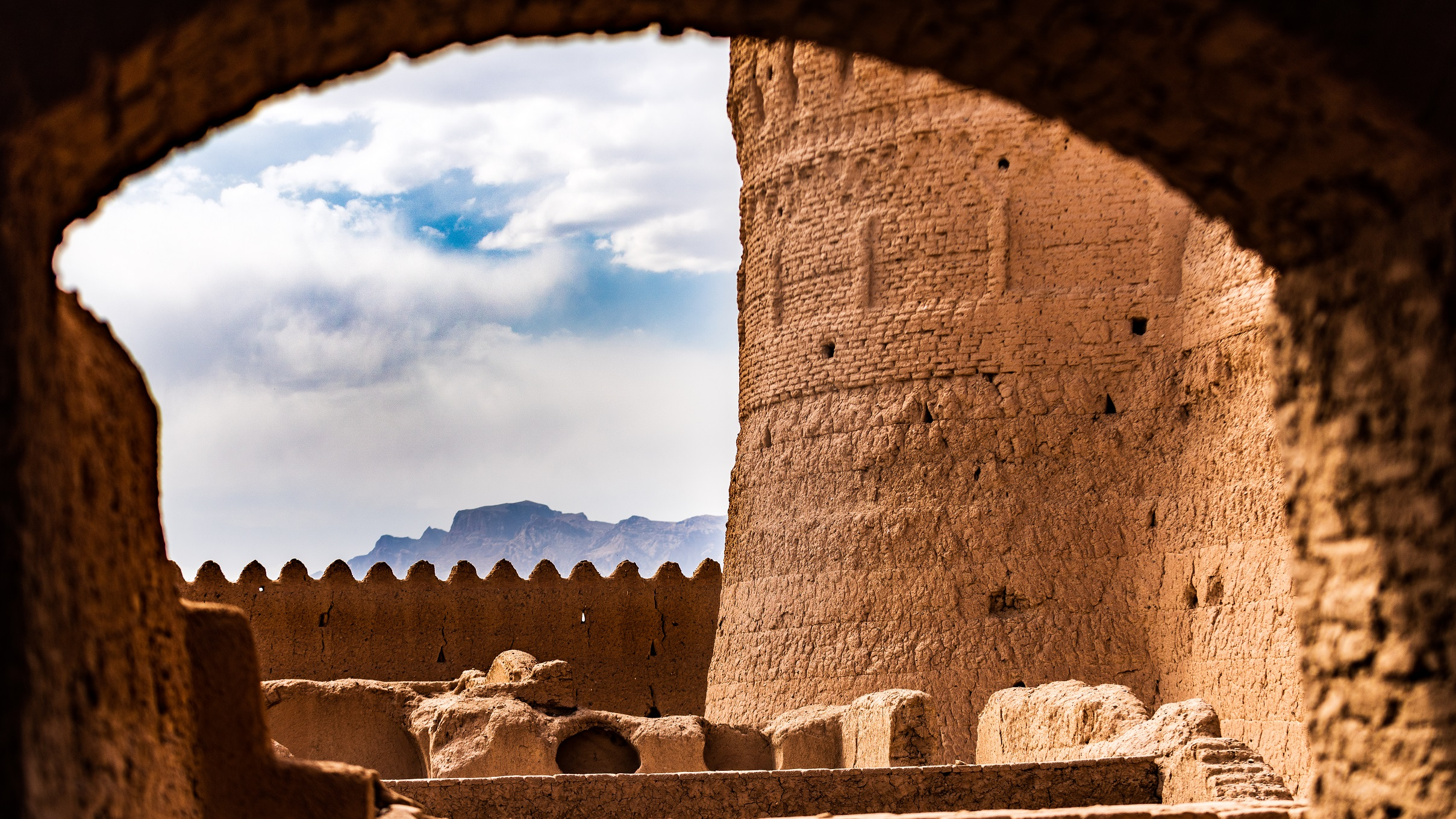
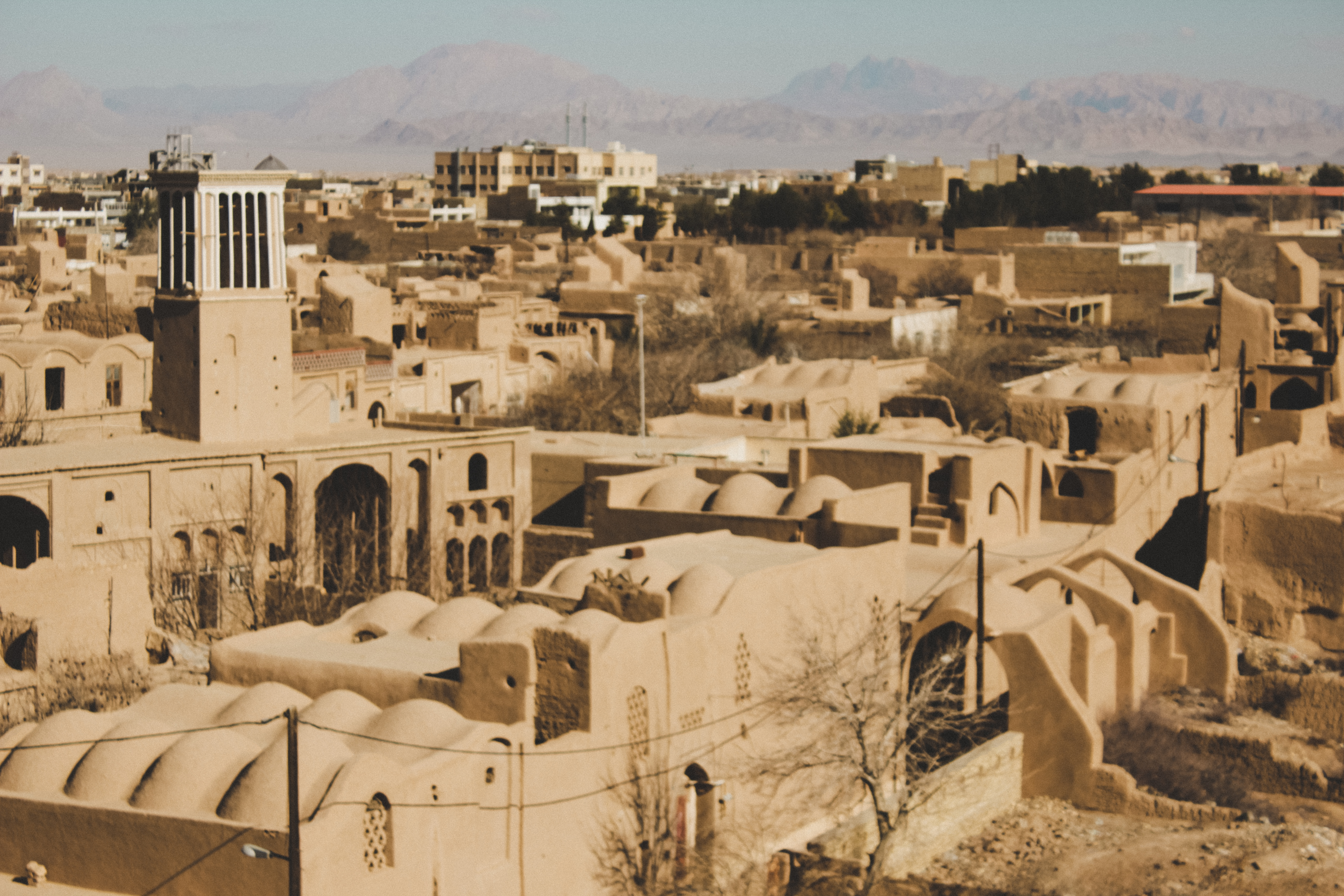
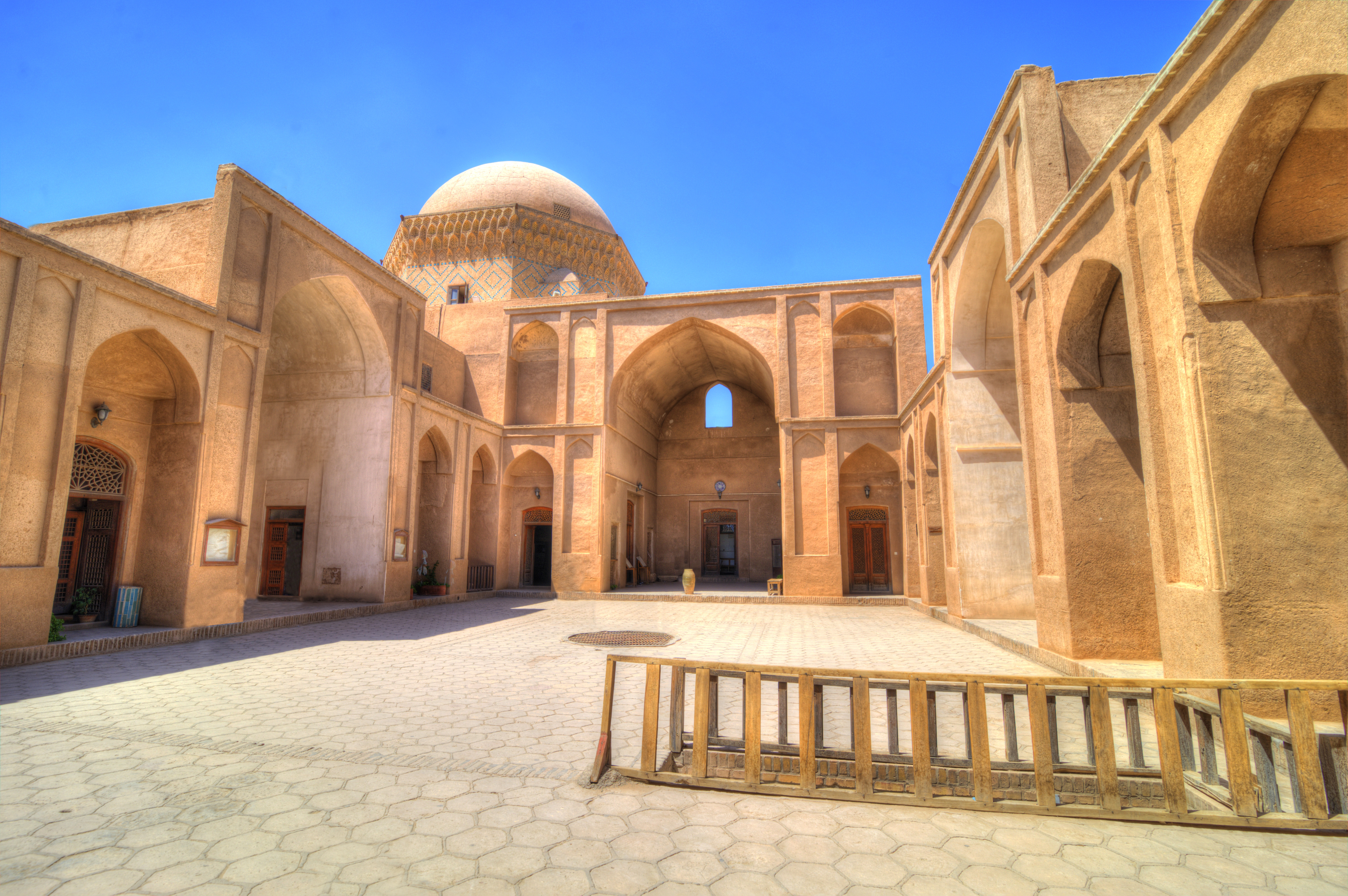
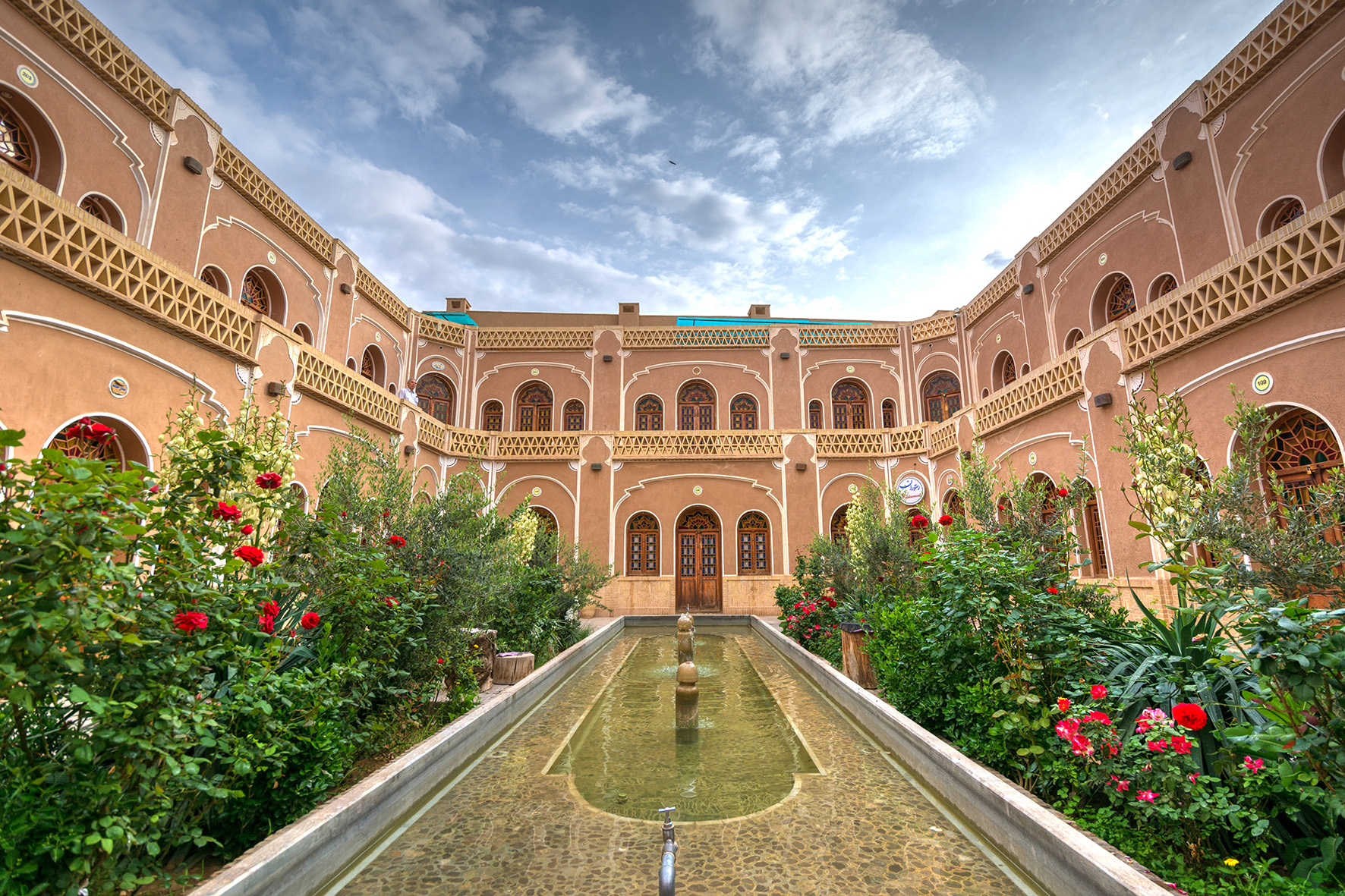
- Amir Chakhmaq Complex Yazd Atash Behram Jameh Mosque of Yazd Dowlatabad Garden Mehrpadin Castle Meybod Alexander's Prison (Zendaan-e Eskandar) Moshir Caravansary

- Location of Yazd Province within Iran
- Coordinates: 31°30′N 54°40′E
- Country: Iran
- Region: Region 5
- Capital: Yazd
- Counties: 12

Government
  - Governor-general: Mohammad-Reza Babaei (Principlist)

Area
  - Total: 76,469 km^{2} (29,525 sq mi)

Population (2016)
  - Total: 1,138,533
  - Density: 14.889/km^{2} (38.562/sq mi)
- Time zone: UTC+03:30 (IRST)
- Main language(s): Persian
- HDI (2017): 0.824 very high · 5th
- Website: ostanyazd.ir

Yazd province (Persian: استان یزد) (Note: Also romanised as Ostān-e Yazd) is one of the 31 provinces of Iran and is in the center of the country. Its capital is the city of Yazd. In 2014, it was placed in Region 5. The province has an area of 76,469 km^{2}.

== Demographics ==
=== Population ===
At the time of the 2006 National Census, the province's population was 958,323 in 258,691 households. The 2011 national census counted 1,074,428 people living in 309,749 households. The 2016 census measured the population of the province as 1,138,533 in 340,657 households, by which time Tabas County had been separated from the province to join South Khorasan province.

=== Administrative divisions ===

The population history and structural changes of Yazd Province's administrative divisions over three consecutive censuses are shown in the following table.

Yazd Province
Counties	2006	2011	2016
Abarkuh	42,610	46,662	51,552
Ardakan	66,900	77,758	97,960
Ashkezar	28,072	33,192	32,566
Bafq	51,507	41,876	50,845
Behabad (Note: Separated from Bafq County after the 2006 census)	—	15,331	17,221
Khatam	31,695	35,158	36,562
Marvast (Note: Separated from Khatam County after the 2016 census)	—	—	—
Mehriz	43,363	44,126	51,733
Meybod	70,728	82,840	99,727
Tabas (Note: Transferred to South Khorasan Province after the 2011 census)	63,047	69,658	—
Taft	45,357	45,145	43,893
Yazd	515,044	582,682	656,474
Zarach (Note: Separated from Yazd County after the 2016 census)	—	—	—
Total	958,323	1,074,428	1,138,533

=== Cities ===
According to the 2016 census, 971,355 people (over 85% of the population of Yazd province) live in the following cities:

City	Population
Abarkuh	27,524
Ahmadabad	6,046
Aqda	1,754
Ardakan	75,271
Ashkezar	19,123
Bafq	45,453
Bafruiyeh	6,939
Behabad	9,232
Hamidiya	51,793
Herat	13,032
Khezrabad	535
Marvast	9,379
Mehrdasht	8,097
Mehriz	34,237
Meybod	80,712
Nadushan	2,351
Nir	1,740
Shahediyeh	18,309
Taft	18,464
Yazd	529,673
Zarach	11,691

== Geography ==
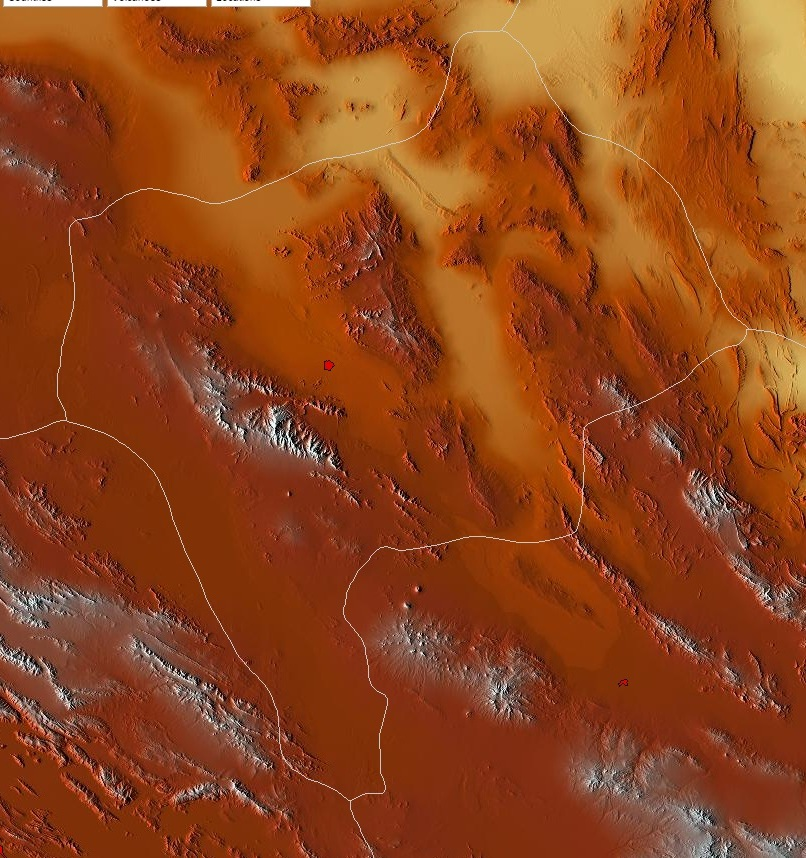
Yazd Province relief

Yazd Province with the area of 129,285 km^{2} (49,917 sq mi) is situated in an oasis where the Dasht-e Kavir desert and the Dasht-e Lut desert meet. The city itself is sometimes called "the bride of the Kavir" because of its location, in a valley between Shir Kuh, the tallest mountain in the region at 4,075 m (13,369 ft) above sea level, and Kharaneq. The city proper is located at 1,203 m (3,947 ft) above sea-level, and covers 16,000 km^{2} (6,200 sq mi).

=== Mountains of Yazd ===
- South- and Southwestern Mountains

This group is wider than the other ridges and includes Shir Kuh.

- Eastern Mountains

They are located in the east of Yazd Province with the highest peaks being Bon Lokht (3002).

== Gallery ==
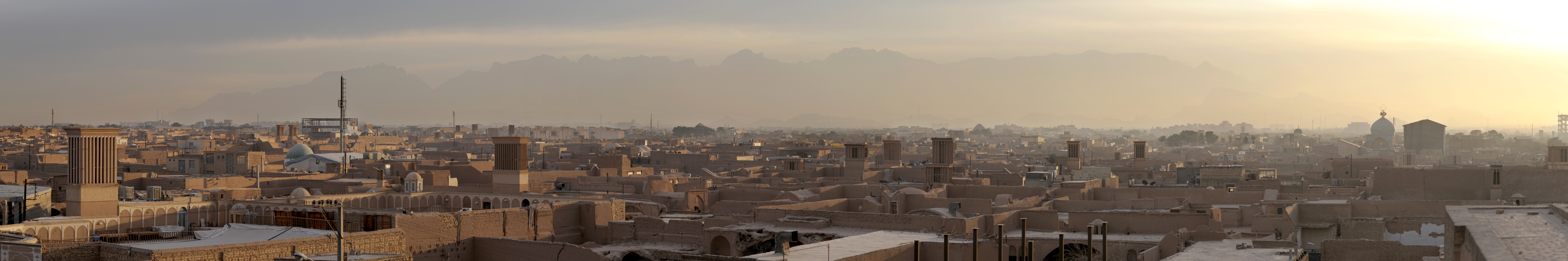
Yazd panorama from the Amir Chakhmaq Complex.

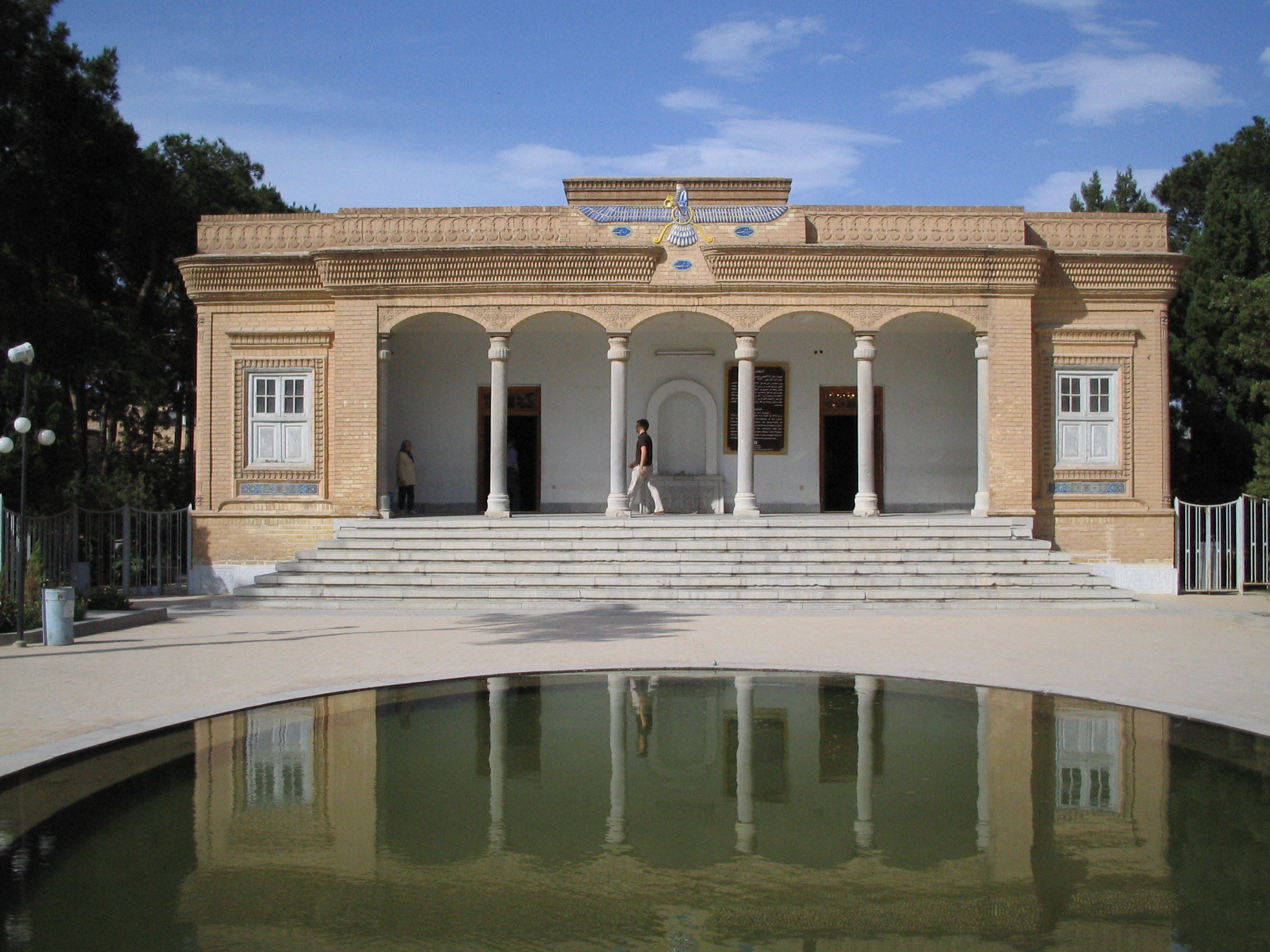
The Zoroastrian temple of Yazd.

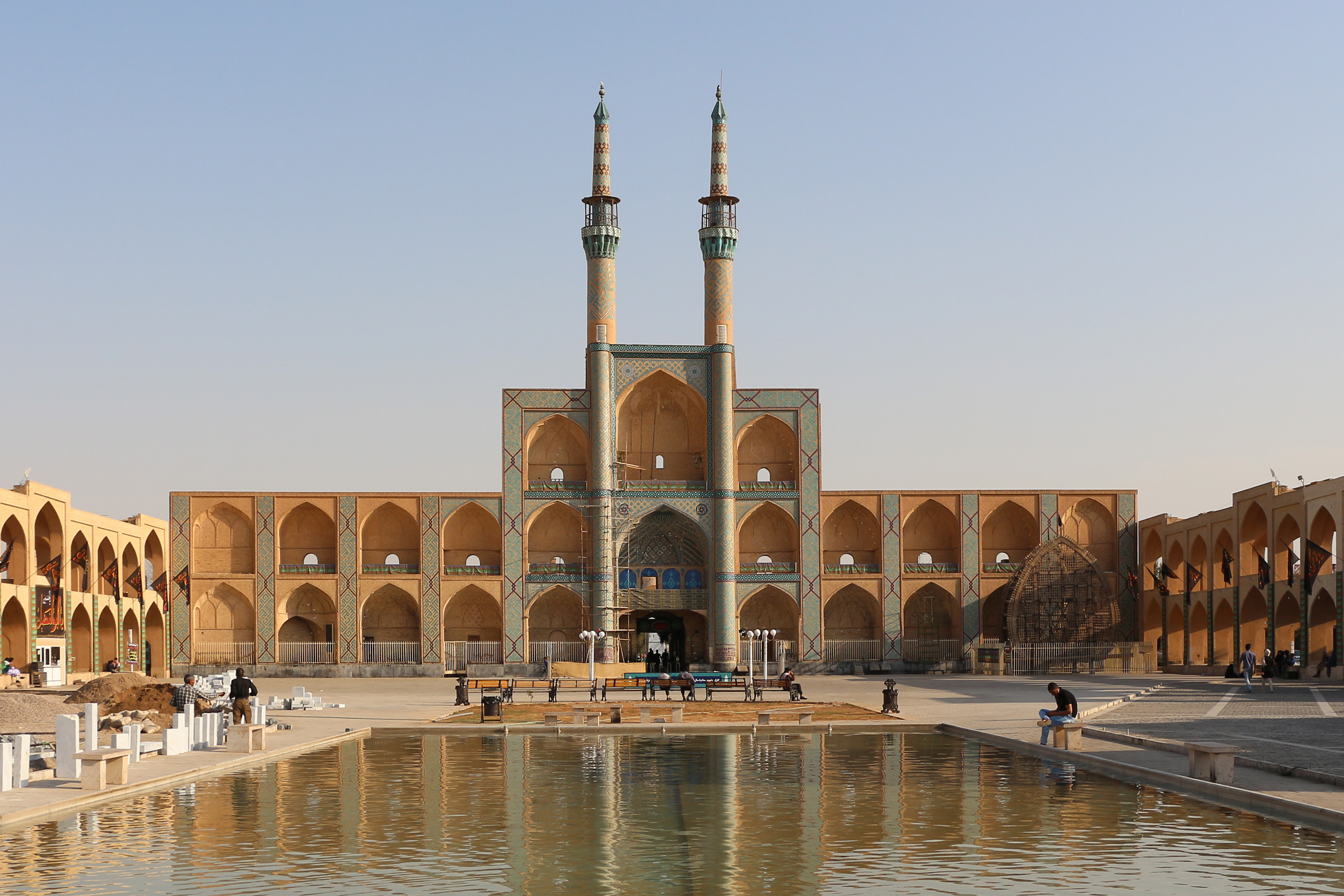
Amir Chakhmaq Complex

== See also ==
Media related to Yazd Province at Wikimedia Commons
