= List of cities, towns and villages in Yazd province =

This is a list of cities, towns and villages in Yazd Province of central Iran:

== Alphabetical ==
Cities are in bold text; all others are villages.

=== A ===
Ab Shureh-ye Ashniz-e Bala | Abarkuh | Abbasabad | Abbasabad | Abbasabad | Abd ol Reza Khani | Abdollah | Abdollahabad | Abgerdu | Aderu | Ahan Shahr | Ahmadabad | Ahmadabad | Ahmadabad | Ahmadabad | Ahmadabad | Ahmadabad | Ahmadabad | Ahmadabad-e Kalateh | Ahmadabad-e Mashir | Ahmadabad-e Rashti | Ahmadiyeh | Ahrok | Akbarabad | Akramabad | Alanguiyeh | Alaviyeh | Ali Hoseyna | Ali Moradi | Aliabad Brick Company | Aliabad Molla Alireza | Aliabad | Aliabad | Aliabad | Aliabad | Aliabad | Aliabad | Aliabad | Aliabad | Aliabadak | Aliabad-e Basab | Aliabad-e Chah Kavir | Aliabad-e Dashti | Aliabad-e Gowd Ginestan | Aliabad-e Sadri | Allahabad | Allahabad | Allahabad | Aminabad | Amirabad | Amirabad | Amirabad | Amirabad | Anarestan | Anjiravand | Anjireh | Anjireh-ye Pain | Aqda | Arababad | Ardakan | Arij | Asadabad | Asadabad-e Bala | Asadabad-e Pain | Asfyj | Ashkalun | Ashkezar | Ashkuh | Ashnai | Ashniz-e Bala | Ashtijeh | Askariyeh | Askariyeh | Atabak | Atarabad | Ayisar Gran Integrated Poultry Company | Ayyubiyeh Agriculture Department | Azimabad | Azizabad | Azizabad | Azmighan

=== B ===
Babruiyeh | Badamak | Badrabad | Bafq | Bafruiyeh | Bagh Bid | Bagh Dar | Bagh Dehuk | Bagh Khatun | Bagh-e Kahleh | Bagh-e Madan | Bagh-e Mehdi | Bagh-e Now | Baghestan | Baghmian | Bahadoran | Baharestan | Bajgan | Bakh | Bakhtiari | Bamakan | Banadak Sadat | Banadkuk-e Dizeh | Bandar | Bandazun | Band-e Chenar | Band-e Meyan | Banestan | Baniz | Baqerabad | Baqiabad | Bar Kuiyeh | Bardestan | Basab | Bashari | Bashgan | Baz | Bazuk-e Arbab | Bazuk-e Malek | Bedaf | Behabad | Behdan | Beheshtabad | Beheshtabad | Belil | Benafti | Beynabad | Bid Akhvid | Bidan-e Panj | Bidestan | Bisheh | Bondorabad | Bonestan | Boruiyeh | Bozgabad | Bozhughar | Buiabad | Bujru | Buraq

=== C ===
Chafteh | Chah Abu ol Fazl | Chah Afzal | Chah Alahiyeh | Chah Aliabad Feyaz | Chah Balu | Chah Boneh | Chah Kam | Chah Matak | Chah Mosafer | Chah Murtuni | Chah Sorkh | Chah Tarakh-e Olya | Chahak | Chah-e Akrami | Chah-e Ali Sarbazi | Chah-e Ashkezriha | Chah-e Ayibegi Mirza Gholam Ali | Chah-e Basheh | Chah-e Beyki | Chah-e Chehel Gazy Ahmad Dehqan | Chah-e Darvish Azadi | Chah-e Eslamabad Kandar | Chah-e Ghanch Ali Baqeri | Chah-e Gowd | Chah-e Hajji Mahmud Zerabi va Shorka | Chah-e Hoseyni | Chah-e Howz-e Karbalai Asadollah | Chah-e Kamran | Chah-e Khoda Morad Babari | Chah-e Khurmizi | Chah-e Madrasi | Chah-e Mast Ali | Chah-e Mehdiabad | Chah-e Mian Dar | Chah-e Mohammadabad Delbar | Chah-e Mohammadabad Yazdani | Chah-e Puzeh | Chah-e Rahmatabad | Chah-e Rezaabad | Chah-e Seyyed Jelal Sabz | Chah-e Shahid Faghani | Chah-e Sherkat-e Gusht Shomareh-ye Yek | Chah-e Shohada | Chah-e Shomareh-ye Yek va Do Ali Naji Rafsanjani | Chah-e Shur | Chah-e Vali Eserkandar | Chahuk | Chak Chak | Chakeri | Chalmeh | Cham | Char Khab | Chekab | Chenarak | Chenar-e Naz | Cheshmeh Now | Chiruk

=== D ===
Dalaku | Damak-e Aliabad | Dar Dehu-ye Pain | Darb Bagh | Darb Has | Darb-e Hanz | Darb-e Raz | Darbid | Darestan | Darin | Darreh Arzani | Darreh Gol | Darreh Shir | Darreh Sir | Darreh | Darreh-ye Gazeh | Darreh-ye Zereshk | Dasht Deh | Dashtabad | Dashtgharan | Dashti-ye Khan | Dashtok-e Olya | Dashtok-e Sofla | Dashtuk | Dastgerdan | Dastjerd | Deh Ali-ye Asfyj | Deh Askar | Deh Now | Deh Now | Deh Now | Deh Now | Deh Now-e Razaviyeh | Deh Nowiyeh | Deh-e Arab | Deh-e Jamal | Deh-e Mirza Ahmad | Deh-e Mohammad | Deh-e Mohammad Rafi | Deh-e Now Dasht | Deh-e Now Molla Esmail | Deh-e Shadi | Deh-e Shur | Deh-e Tah | Dehnowvan | Dehnow-ye Fatemeh Barat | Dehshir | Derend | Didarak | Dizran | Dorond-e Olya | Dowgun | Dowlatabad | Dowlatabad | Dowlatabad-e Amanat | Dulab

=== E ===
Ebrahimabad | Ebrahimabad | Ebrahimabad | Ebrahimabad | Ebrahimabad | Ebrahimabad | Ebrahimabad-e Bala | Ebrahimabad-e Cheshmeh Nazer | Emamzadeh Ali | Enayatiyeh | Eqbalabad | Erdan | Ernan | Esfahak | Esfandabad | Esfandiar | Eshqabad | Eslamabad | Eslamabad-e Chah-e Manj | Eslamiyeh | Esmailabad | Esmatabad | Esmatabad | Espidar | Estakhruyeh | Estarj | Eyshabad | Ezabad

=== F ===
Fahalanj | Fahraj Brick Company Industrial Estate | Fahraj | Fakhrabad | Fakhrabad | Fakhrabad | Faragheh | Fathabad | Fathabad | Fathabad | Fathabad | Fazlabad-e Sofla | Ferdowsiyeh | Feyzabad | Feyzabad | Feyzabad-e Kohneh | Feyzabad-e Now | Firuzabad | Firuzabad | Firuzabad-e Toluy | Fudij

=== G ===
Galeh Gerd | Galuyak-e Olya | Galuyak-e Sofla | Gariz-e Olya | Gariz-e Sofla | Gavijak | Gazestan | Gazestan | Gazumeh | Genegav | Ghaniabad | Ghiasabad | Gol Afshad | Gol Kan | Gol Shaneh | Gorginabad | Gowd-e Bid | Gurab | Gusheh Kamar

=== H ===
Hadi Khani | Haftadar | Hafthar | Hajji Hoseyn | Hajji Morad | Hajji Shams | Hajjiabad | Hajjiabad | Hajjiabad | Hajjiabad | Hajjiabad | Hajjiabad | Hajjiabad | Hajjiabad-e Bala | Hajjiabad-e Zarrin | Hakimabad | Hakimabad | Halvan | Hamaneh | Hamaneh | Hamidiya | Hamsok | Hanza | Harabarjan | Harisk-e Olya | Harofteh | Haruni | Hasanabad | Hasanabad | Hasanabad | Hasanabad | Hasanabad | Hasanabad | Hasanabad | Hasanabad | Hasanabad-e Anaraki | Hasanabad-e Darreh Zereshk | Hasanabad-e Etemad | Hasanabad-e Marshad | Hashemabad | Hashemabad | Hashemabad | Hek | Hemmatabad | Hemmatabad | Hemmatabad | Hemmatabad | Herat | Herisht | Heruk | Heshmatabad | Heydarabad | Heydariyeh | Hojjatabad | Hojjatabad | Hojjatabad | Hojjatabad-e Olya | Hojjatabad-e Sofla | Homijan | Hoseynabad | Hoseynabad Sar Kazeh | Hoseynabad | Hoseynabad | Hoseynabad | Hoseynabad | Hoseynabad | Hoseynabad | Hoseynabad | Hoseynabad | Hoseynabad | Hoseynabad | Hoseynabad-e Deh Askar | Hoseynabad-e Kalagushi | Hoseynabad-e Navvab | Hoseynabad-e Pashmi | Hoseynabad-e Pur Akbari | Hoseynabad-e Rismani | Hoseynabad-e Shafi Pur | Hoseynabad-e Shurabeh | Hoseyni | Howz-e Chah-e Pey Ab | Howz-e Zireh | Hudar | Hudar | Huk

=== I ===
Industrial Estate |

=== J ===
Jafarabad | Jafarabad | Jafarabad | Jaft Do Pa | Jahanabad | Jahanabad | Jahanabad-e Meybod Industrial Estate | Jalalabad | Jalalabad | Jalalabad-e Dezak | Jamalabad | Jamz | Jan Barazan | Jannat | Javadiyeh | Jow Khvah | Jowriz | Jowzestan | Jowzi |

=== K ===
Kaad Ranching and Farming Company | Kafiabad | Kahduiyeh | Kahnuj | Kahnuj | Kalateh-ye Rezaqoli | Kalbali | Kal-e Abdol Ghani | Kalleh Howzha | Kam Kuh | Kamalabad | Kamkuiyeh | Kamraniyeh | Kapu | Karimabad | Karimabad | Karimabad | Karimabad | Karimabad | Karkas Ab | Kavijan | Kavir Kaj | Kazemabad | Kerdabad | Kermani | Keykuh | Kezab | Kezabcheh | Khalilabad | Khalilabad | Khamesabad | Khamsian | Kharanaq | Kharavan-e Olya | Kharavan-e Sofla | Khareng | Khargushi | Kharv-e Olya | Kharv-e Sofla | Khavas Kuh | Khavidak | Kheskok | Kheyrabad | Kheyrabad | Kheyrabad | Khezrabad | Khodaabad-e Bala | Khodaabad-e Pain | Khorramabad | Khoshkabad | Khosrowabad | Khosrowabad | Khowdafarin-e Hoseynabad-e Baqeri | Khowrah-e Sofla | Khud-e Bala | Khud-e Pain | Khusef | Khvansar | Khvormiz-e Olya | Khvormiz-e Sofla | Khvorshidabad | Koloppeh | Kordabad | Kordabad | Korit | Korizan | Korkhongan | Kukok | Kushk | Kushk |

=== L ===
Lakhvajeh | Lalabad | Lay-e Ahmad | Lay-e Farashahi | Lay-e Landar | Lay-e Shuruneh |

=== M ===
Madan Qaleh | Madan-e Khak-e Nasuz-e Godar Dashtuk | Maduiyeh | Madvar | Mahalleh-ye Baghel | Mahdiabad | Mahmud Hoseyn | Mahmudabad | Mahmudabad | Mahmudabad | Mahmudabad-e Nasri | Mahmudi | Malvand | Manshad | Mansurabad | Mansurabad | Mansuri | Mansuriyeh | Marghub | Marvar | Marvast | Maryamabad | Marzanak | Mashghaleh Zar | Mavdar | Mazraeh Molla | Mazraeh-ye Ahmad | Mazraeh-ye Akarmi | Mazraeh-ye Akhund | Mazraeh-ye Ali Akbar Khan | Mazraeh-ye Ali | Mazraeh-ye Amin | Mazraeh-ye Aqa | Mazraeh-ye Attar | Mazraeh-ye Barzegar | Mazraeh-ye Bideh | Mazraeh-ye Hajj Ali Asgar | Mazraeh-ye Hajji Abdollah | Mazraeh-ye Hajji Ali Baba | Mazraeh-ye Hajji Hasan | Mazraeh-ye Hajji Hoseyn | Mazraeh-ye Hajji Mohammad Jafari | Mazraeh-ye Hajji Yusef | Mazraeh-ye Hajji Zeynal | Mazraeh-ye Hasan Charkhani | Mazraeh-ye Hasan | Mazraeh-ye Hoseyn | Mazraeh-ye Kalantar | Mazraeh-ye Khosrow | Mazraeh-ye Kuhi | Mazraeh-ye Mian Tahuneh | Mazraeh-ye Mirha | Mazraeh-ye Mirza Mohammad Ali | Mazraeh-ye Mohammad Jafar | Mazraeh-ye Mostufa | Mazraeh-ye Now | Mazraeh-ye Now-e Chahuk | Mazraeh-ye Omm Hasan | Mazraeh-ye Pasand | Mazraeh-ye Seyyed | Mazraeh-ye Sharif | Mehdiabad | Mehdiabad | Mehdiabad | Mehdiabad | Mehdiabad | Mehdiabad | Mehdiabad | Mehrabad | Mehrabad | Mehrdasht | Mehriz | Meybod | Meybod Lime Kiln Company | Meybod Railway Station | Meymuneh | Mezang | Mil Sefid | Mir Hashem | Mirokabad | Mobarakeh | Mobarakeh | Mobarakeh | Moghestan-e Akbar | Mohammad Jani | Mohammadabad | Mohammadabad | Mohammadabad | Mohammadabad | Mohammadabad | Mohammadabad | Mohammadabad | Mohammadabad | Mohammadabad-e Alizadeh | Mohammadabad-e Chah Kavir | Mohammadabad-e Gowd Ginestan | Mohammadabad-e Nilchi | Mohammadabad-e Saidabad | Mohammadiyeh | Mohammadiyeh | Mohsenabad | Mokhallesun | Molkuh | Moradabad | Mosha-e Jeyyed | Mowmenabad | Mowr | Mowrok | Muriabad | Musaabad

=== N ===
Nad Kuh-e Olya | Naden-e Sofla | Nadushan | Nafisabad | Najafabad | Nasrabad | Nasrabad | Nasrabad | Nay Band | Nejatabad | Neyestan | Neyestan | Neyuk-e Sofla | Nir | Nosratabad | Nuk | Nurabad | Nurabad

=== O ===
Oshtorak | Ostorij | Ozbekuy-e Jadid |

=== P ===
Padeh-ye Bid | Panahkuh | Pandar | Pargan | Park | Parvadeh | Pashneh Daran | Patgigan | Patkestan | Pay Ostan | Payaneh-ye Bar Yazd | Pazar | Peykuh | Pir Hajat | Provincial Cultural Complex |

=== Q ===
Qalandari | Qaleh-ye Khan | Qaleh-ye Khorgushi | Qamiyeh | Qanatu | Qanbarabad | Qarcheh | Qasemabad | Qatram | Qavamabad | Qavamiyeh | Qoroq

=== R ===
Rabiabad | Radabad | Rahimabad | Rahimabad | Rahimabad | Rahimabad | Rahmatabad | Rahmatabad | Rahmatabad | Rahmatabad | Raisabad | Rameh Kuh | Ranjeqan | Rasti | Rasulabad | Razaviyeh | Razaviyeh-ye Abkhvorak | Reshkuiyeh | Rezaabad | Rezaabad | Robat-e Khan | Robat-e Posht-e Badam | Roknabad | Rud-e Bozan

=== S ===
Sadabad | Sadeqabad | Sadeqabad | Sadeqabad | Sadeqabad | Sadrabad | Sadrabad | Saduyeh | Safiabad | Saghand | Saidabad | Saidabad | Salehabad | Salimabad-e Olya | Samba | Samsamabad | Sangab | Sang-e Deraz | Saniabad | Sanij | Sar Cheshmeh | Sar Yazd | Sarbala | Sarchah-e Varaun | Sareshk | Sarv | Sarv-e Olya | Sarv-e Sofla | Sefid Kuh | Senjed | Senjedak | Senjedu | Seyf ol Din | Seyfabad | Seyyed Aqai | Seyyed Mirza | Seyyedabad | Seyyedabad | Shad Kam | Shah Neshin | Shahediyeh | Shahneh | Shahr Asb | Shahrabad | Shahrabad | Shahriari-ye Olya | Shahriari-ye Sofla | Shamsabad | Shamsabad | Shamsabad | Shamsabad | Shamsabad | Shamsi | Sharafabad | Sharifabad | Sharifabad | Sharifabad | Shavvaz | Sherkat-e Sahami Mehr | Sheykh Alishah | Sheykhabad | Sheytur | Shirabad | Shohada | Shorb ol Ayn | Siahuiyeh | Simkuiyeh | Soltanabad | Soltaneb | Sorond | Surak | Surk-e Sofla

=== T ===
Tabas Airport | Taft | Tahuneh | Tajabad | Tak Baghestan | Talebabad | Tamehr | Tang Chenar | Tang-e Adhaneh | Tappeh Taq | Taqiabad | Taqiabad | Taqiabad | Taqiabad | Taqviyeh | Tashkanan | Tashkuiyeh | Tavani-ye Shomareh-ye Haft | Tezenj | Tezerjan | Tijerd | Tituzeynal | Tizuk | Tolombeh Sarbozi | Torababad | Torkabad | Torkan | Tudeh | Tudeh | Turan Posht | Tut | Tutak |

=== V ===
Vaqfak | Vaziri

=== Y ===
Yakhab | Yaqubiyeh | Yazd | Yazd Airport | Yazd Industrial Estate | Yusefabad-e Bam

=== Z ===
Zabar Kuh | Zanughan | Zarach Integrated Industrial Complex | Zarach | Zarband | Zardeyn | Zardgah | Zarju | Zarkuiyeh | Zarru | Zeynabad | Zeynabad | Zir-e Bagh-e Shah | Zirkuiyeh
