= Madvar =

Madvar (Persian: مدوار) may refer to:

- Madvar, Kerman
- Madvar, Yazd
