= Mahmood Hussain =

Mahmood Hussain may refer to:

- Mahmood Hussain (cricketer) (1932–1991), Pakistani Test cricketer
- Mahmood Hussain (councillor), former Lord Mayor of Birmingham
- Mahmood Hussain (field hockey), Pakistani hockey player
- Mahmood Hossain (born 1972), Bangladeshi academic
- Mehmood Hussain, Indian filmmaker
- Mahmud Husain, Pakistani academic and politician
- Mahmud Hoseyn, village in Iran
