= Shad Kam, Yazd =

Shad Kam شادكام
- Village
- Location within Iran
- Coordinates: 31°29′17″N 55°48′29″E
- Country: Iran
- Province: Yazd
- County: Bafq
- Bakhsh: Central
- Rural District: Mobarakeh

Population (2006)
  - Total: 89
- Time zone: UTC+3:30 (IRST)
  - Summer (DST): UTC+4:30 (IRDT)

Shad Kam (Persian: شادكام, also Romanized as Shād Kām) is a village in Mobarakeh Rural District, in the Central District of Bafq County, Yazd Province, Iran. At the 2006 census, its population was 89, in 39 families.
