= Shahrabad, Bafq =

Shahrabad شهراباد
- Village
- Location within Iran
- Coordinates: 31°36′36″N 55°24′00″E
- Country: Iran
- Province: Yazd
- County: Bafq
- Bakhsh: Central
- Rural District: Mobarakeh

Population (2006)
  - Total: 29
- Time zone: UTC+3:30 (IRST)
  - Summer (DST): UTC+4:30 (IRDT)

Shahrabad (Persian: شهراباد, also Romanized as Shahrābād) is a village in Mobarakeh Rural District, in the Central District of Bafq County, Yazd Province, Iran. At the 2006 census, its population was 29, in 9 families.
