= Mir Hashem =

Village in Yazd, Iran

Mir Hashem ميرهاشم
- Village
- Location within Iran
- Coordinates: 31°27′43″N 54°15′13″E
- Country: Iran
- Province: Yazd
- County: Taft
- Bakhsh: Nir
- Rural District: Zardeyn

Population (2006)
  - Total: 133
- Time zone: UTC+3:30 (IRST)
  - Summer (DST): UTC+4:30 (IRDT)

Mir Hashem (Persian: ميرهاشم, also Romanized as Mīr Hāshem; also known as Ebrāhīmābād and Mīr Hāshim) is a village in Zardeyn Rural District, Nir District, Taft County, Yazd Province, Iran. At the 2006 census, its population was 133, in 53 families.
