= Ahan Shahr =

Ahan Shahr اهن شهر
- Village
- Location within Iran
- Coordinates: 31°37′04″N 55°25′32″E
- Country: Iran
- Province: Yazd
- County: Bafq
- Bakhsh: Central
- Rural District: Mobarakeh

Population (2006)
  - Total: 1,079
- Time zone: UTC+3:30 (IRST)
  - Summer (DST): UTC+4:30 (IRDT)

Ahan Shahr (Persian: اهن شهر, also Romanized as Āhan Shahr) is a village in Mobarakeh Rural District, in the Central District of Bafq County, Yazd Province, Iran. At the 2006 census, its population was 1,079, in 280 families.
