= Hajji Morad, Yazd =

Hajji Morad حاجي مراد
- Village
- Country: Iran
- Province: Yazd
- County: Taft
- Bakhsh: Nir
- Rural District: Zardeyn

Population (2006)
  - Total: 9
- Time zone: UTC+3:30 (IRST)
  - Summer (DST): UTC+4:30 (IRDT)

Hajji Morad (Persian: حاجي مراد, also Romanized as Ḩājjī Morād) is a village in Zardeyn Rural District, Nir District, Taft County, Yazd Province, Iran. At the 2006 census, its population was 9, in 4 families.
