= Khosrowabad, Abarkuh =

Khosrowabad خسرواباد
- Village
- Location within Iran
- Coordinates: 31°03′35″N 53°03′59″E
- Country: Iran
- Province: Yazd
- County: Abarkuh
- Bakhsh: Central
- Rural District: Faragheh

Population (2006)
  - Total: 76
- Time zone: UTC+3:30 (IRST)
  - Summer (DST): UTC+4:30 (IRDT)

Khosrowabad (Persian: خسرواباد, also Romanized as Khosrowābād) is a village in Faragheh Rural District, in the Central District of Abarkuh County, Yazd Province, Iran. At the 2006 census, its population was 76, in 18 families.
