= Deh-e Arab =

Deh-e Arab ده عرب
- Village
- Location within Iran
- Coordinates: 31°01′37″N 53°02′27″E
- Country: Iran
- Province: Yazd
- County: Abarkuh
- Bakhsh: Central
- Rural District: Faragheh

Population (2006)
  - Total: 925
- Time zone: UTC+3:30 (IRST)
  - Summer (DST): UTC+4:30 (IRDT)

Deh-e Arab (Persian: ده عرب, romanized: Deh-e ‘Arab) is a village in Faragheh Rural District, in the Central District of Abarkuh County, Yazd Province, Iran. At the 2006 census, its population was 925, in 271 families.
