= Sadeqabad, Abarkuh =

Sadeqabad صادق اباد
- Village
- Location within Iran
- Coordinates: 31°03′23″N 53°02′39″E
- Country: Iran
- Province: Yazd
- County: Abarkuh
- Bakhsh: Central
- Rural District: Faragheh

Population (2006)
  - Total: 235
- Time zone: UTC+3:30 (IRST)
  - Summer (DST): UTC+4:30 (IRDT)

Sadeqabad (Persian: صادق اباد, also Romanized as Şādeqābād; also known as Sadegh Abad and Sādiqābād) is a village in Faragheh Rural District, in the Central District of Abarkuh County, Yazd Province, Iran. At the 2006 census, its population was 235, in 65 families.
