= Darreh Gol, Yazd =

Darreh Gol دره گل
- Village
- Location within Iran
- Coordinates: 31°26′57″N 54°16′05″E
- Country: Iran
- Province: Yazd
- County: Taft
- Bakhsh: Nir
- Rural District: Zardeyn

Population (2006)
  - Total: 65
- Time zone: UTC+3:30 (IRST)
  - Summer (DST): UTC+4:30 (IRDT)

Darreh Gol (Persian: دره گل; also known as Darreh Gel) is a village in Zardeyn Rural District, Nir District, Taft County, Yazd Province, Iran. At the 2006 census, its population was 65, in 21 families.
