= Sang-e Deraz =

Sang-e Deraz سنگدراز
- Village
- Location within Iran
- Coordinates: 31°27′32″N 54°12′45″E
- Country: Iran
- Province: Yazd
- County: Taft
- Bakhsh: Nir
- Rural District: Zardeyn

Population (2006)
  - Total: 207
- Time zone: UTC+3:30 (IRST)
  - Summer (DST): UTC+4:30 (IRDT)

Sang-e Deraz (Persian: سنگدراز, also Romanized as Sang-e Derāz) is a village in Zardeyn Rural District, Nir District, Taft County, Yazd Province, Iran. At the 2006 census, its population was 207, in 78 families.
