= Rabiabad, Yazd =

Rabiabad ربيع اباد
- Village
- Location within Iran
- Coordinates: 31°26′11″N 54°14′54″E
- Country: Iran
- Province: Yazd
- County: Taft
- Bakhsh: Nir
- Rural District: Zardeyn

Population (2006)
  - Total: 48
- Time zone: UTC+3:30 (IRST)
  - Summer (DST): UTC+4:30 (IRDT)

Rabiabad (Persian: ربيع اباد, also Romanized as Rabī‘ābād) is a village in Zardeyn Rural District, Nir District, Taft County, Yazd Province, Iran. At the 2006 census, its population was 48, in 17 families.
