= Band-e Meyan =

Band-e Meyan بندميان
- Village
- Country: Iran
- Province: Yazd
- County: Abarkuh
- Bakhsh: Central
- Rural District: Faragheh

Population (2006)
  - Total: 22
- Time zone: UTC+3:30 (IRST)
  - Summer (DST): UTC+4:30 (IRDT)

Band-e Meyan (Persian: بندميان, romanized: Band-e Meyān) is a village in Faragheh Rural District, in the Central District of Abarkuh County, Yazd Province, Iran. At the 2006 census, its population was 22, in 6 families.
