= Qatram =

Qotrom قطرم
- Village
- Location within Iran
- Coordinates: 31°25′23″N 55°48′14″E
- Country: Iran
- Province: Yazd
- County: Bafq
- Bakhsh: Central
- Rural District: Mobarakeh

Government

Population (2006)
  - Total: 55
- Time zone: UTC+3:30 (IRST)
  - Summer (DST): UTC+4:30 (IRDT)

Qotrom (Persian: قطرم, also Romanized as Qoţrom) is a village in Mobarakeh Rural District, in the Central District of Bafq County, Yazd Province, Iran. At the 2006 census, its population was 55, in 29 families.
