= Safiabad, Yazd =

Safiabad صفي اباد
- Village
- Location within Iran
- Coordinates: 31°02′40″N 53°02′35″E
- Country: Iran
- Province: Yazd
- County: Abarkuh
- Bakhsh: Central
- Rural District: Faragheh

Population (2006)
  - Total: 552
- Time zone: UTC+3:30 (IRST)
  - Summer (DST): UTC+4:30 (IRDT)

Safiabad (Persian: صفي اباد, also Romanized as Şafīābād) is a village in Faragheh Rural District, in the Central District of Abarkuh County, Yazd Province, Iran. At the 2006 census, its population was 552, in 163 families.
