= Sadeqabad, Bafq =

Sadeqabad صادق اباد
- Village
- Location within Iran
- Coordinates: 31°43′51″N 55°20′03″E
- Country: Iran
- Province: Yazd
- County: Bafq
- Bakhsh: Central
- Rural District: Mobarakeh

Population (2006)
  - Total: 17
- Time zone: UTC+3:30 (IRST)
  - Summer (DST): UTC+4:30 (IRDT)

Sadeqabad (Persian: صادق اباد, also Romanized as Şādeqābād) is a village in Mobarakeh Rural District, in the Central District of Bafq County, Yazd Province, Iran. At the 2006 census, its population was 17, in 5 families.
