= Baghmian =

Baghmian باغ ميان
- Village
- Location within Iran
- Coordinates: 31°26′40″N 54°15′03″E
- Country: Iran
- Province: Yazd
- County: Taft
- Bakhsh: Nir
- Rural District: Zardeyn

Population (2006)
  - Total: 136
- Time zone: UTC+3:30 (IRST)
  - Summer (DST): UTC+4:30 (IRDT)

Baghmian (Persian: باغ ميان, romanized: Bāghmīān) is a village in Zardeyn Rural District, Nir District, Taft County, Yazd Province, Iran. At the 2006 census, its population was 136, in 37 families.
