= Chahuk, Yazd =

Chahuk چاهوك
- Village
- Location within Iran
- Coordinates: 31°27′20″N 54°11′10″E
- Country: Iran
- Province: Yazd
- County: Taft
- Bakhsh: Nir
- Rural District: Zardeyn

Population (2006)
  - Total: 411
- Time zone: UTC+3:30 (IRST)
  - Summer (DST): UTC+4:30 (IRDT)

Chahuk (Persian: چاهوك, also Romanized as Chāhūk and Chahook; also known as Chāhok, Chauk, and Chok) is a village in Zardeyn Rural District, Nir District, Taft County, Yazd Province, Iran. At the 2006 census, its population was 411, in 124 families.
