= Bagh-e Kahleh =

Bagh-e Kahleh باغ كهله
- Village
- Country: Iran
- Province: Yazd
- County: Taft
- Bakhsh: Central
- Rural District: Pishkuh

Population (2006)
  - Total: 150
- Time zone: UTC+3:30 (IRST)
  - Summer (DST): UTC+4:30 (IRDT)

Bagh-e Kahleh (Persian: باغ كهله, romanized: Bāgh-e Kahleh) is a village in Pishkuh Rural District, in the Central District of Taft County, Yazd Province, Iran. At the 2006 census, its population was 150, in 52 families.
