= Harisk-e Olya =

Harisk-e Olya هريسك عليا
- Village
- Location within Iran
- Coordinates: 31°42′18″N 55°54′02″E
- Country: Iran
- Province: Yazd
- County: Bafq
- Bakhsh: Central
- Rural District: Kushk

Population (2006)
  - Total: 74
- Time zone: UTC+3:30 (IRST)
  - Summer (DST): UTC+4:30 (IRDT)

Harisk-e Olya (Persian: هريسك عليا, also Romanized as Harīsk-e ‘Olyā; also known as Harīsk-e Bālā) is a village in Kushk Rural District, in the Central District of Bafq County, Yazd Province, Iran. At the 2006 census, its population was 74, in 20 families.
