= Ashkuh =

Ashkuh اشكوه
- Village
- Location within Iran
- Coordinates: 31°53′00″N 53°55′00″E
- Country: Iran
- Province: Yazd
- County: Saduq
- Bakhsh: Khezrabad
- Rural District: Kezab

Population (2006)
  - Total: 29
- Time zone: UTC+3:30 (IRST)
  - Summer (DST): UTC+4:30 (IRDT)

Ashkuh (Persian: اشكوه, also Romanized as Ashkūh) is a village in Kezab Rural District, Khezrabad District, Saduq County, Yazd Province, Iran. At the 2006 census, its population was 29, in 8 families.
