= Darreh-ye Gazeh =

Darreh-ye Gazeh دره گازه
- Village
- Location within Iran
- Coordinates: 31°32′05″N 53°50′58″E
- Country: Iran
- Province: Yazd
- County: Taft
- Bakhsh: Central
- Rural District: Dehshir

Population (2006)
  - Total: 20
- Time zone: UTC+3:30 (IRST)
  - Summer (DST): UTC+4:30 (IRDT)

Darreh-ye Gazeh (Persian: دره گازه, also Romanized as Darreh-ye Gāzeh and Darrehgazeh) is a village in Dehshir Rural District, in the Central District of Taft County, Yazd Province, Iran. At the 2006 census, its population was 20, in 9 families.
