= Sanij =

Sanig سانيج
- Village
- Location within Iran
- Coordinates: 31°38′36″N 53°59′31″E
- Country: Iran
- Province: Yazd
- County: Taft
- Bakhsh: Central
- Rural District: Pishkuh

Population (2006)
  - Total: 226
- Time zone: UTC+3:30 (IRST)
  - Summer (DST): UTC+4:30 (IRDT)

Sanig (Persian: سانيج, also Romanized as Sānīg; also known as Sanich, Sānīchābād, Sānieh, Sānīgābād, Sūnich, and Sūnieh) is a village in Pishkuh Rural District, in the Central District of Taft County, Yazd Province, Iran. At the 2006 census, its population was 226, in 93 families.
