= Oshtorak =

Oshtorak اشترك
- Village
- Location within Iran
- Coordinates: 31°44′29″N 56°03′00″E
- Country: Iran
- Province: Yazd
- County: Behabad
- Bakhsh: Central
- Rural District: Banestan

Population (2006)
  - Total: 85
- Time zone: UTC+3:30 (IRST)
  - Summer (DST): UTC+4:30 (IRDT)

Oshtorak (Persian: اشترك, also Romanized as Āshtark and Āshterk) is a village in Banestan Rural District, in the Central District of Behabad County, Yazd Province, Iran. At the 2006 census, its population was 85, in 22 families.
