= Khowdafarin-e Hoseynabad-e Baqeri =

Khowdafarin-e Hoseynabad-e Baqeri خودآفرین حسین‌آباد باقری
- Village
- Country: Iran
- Province: Yazd
- County: Behabad
- Bakhsh: Central
- Rural District: Banestan

Population (2006)
  - Total: 71
- Time zone: UTC+3:30 (IRST)
  - Summer (DST): UTC+4:30 (IRDT)

Khowdafarin-e Hoseynabad-e Baqeri (Persian: خودآفرین حسین‌آد باقری, also Romanized as Khowdāfarīn-e Ḩoseynābād-e Bāqerī) is a village in Banestan Rural District, in the Central District of Behabad County, Yazd Province, Iran. At the 2006 census, its population was 71, in 16 families.
