= Chah Murtuni =

Chah Murtuni چاه مورتوني
- Village
- Location within Iran
- Coordinates: 31°26′17″N 54°29′24″E
- Country: Iran
- Province: Yazd
- County: Mehriz
- Bakhsh: Central
- Rural District: Khvormiz

Population (2006)
  - Total: 19
- Time zone: UTC+3:30 (IRST)
  - Summer (DST): UTC+4:30 (IRDT)

Chah Murtuni (Persian: چاه مورتوني, also Romanized as Chāh Mūrtūnī; also known as Chāh-i-Mortuni, Chāh Morten, Chāh Mūrtīn, and Chāh Mūrtīnī) is a village in Khvormiz Rural District, in the Central District of Mehriz County, Yazd Province, Iran. At the 2006 census, its population was 19, in 8 families.
