= Gowd-e Bid =

Gowd-e Bid گودبيد
- Village
- Location within Iran
- Coordinates: 31°36′00″N 53°44′00″E
- Country: Iran
- Province: Yazd
- County: Taft
- Bakhsh: Central
- Rural District: Dehshir

Population (2006)
  - Total: 29
- Time zone: UTC+3:30 (IRST)
  - Summer (DST): UTC+4:30 (IRDT)

Gowd-e Bid (Persian: گودبيد, also Romanized as Gowd-e Bīd) is a village in Dehshir Rural District, in the Central District of Taft County, Yazd Province, Iran. At the 2006 census, its population was 29, in 4 families.
