= Benafti =

Benafti بنافتي
- Village
- Country: Iran
- Province: Yazd
- County: Mehriz
- Bakhsh: Central
- Rural District: Tang Chenar

Population (2006)
  - Total: 7
- Time zone: UTC+3:30 (IRST)
  - Summer (DST): UTC+4:30 (IRDT)

Benafti (Persian: بنافتي, also Romanized as Benāftī) is a village in Tang Chenar Rural District, in the Central District of Mehriz County, Yazd Province, Iran. At the 2006 census, its population was 7, in 4 families.
