= Mohammadabad-e Saidabad =

Mohammadabad-e Saidabad محمدابادسعيداباد
- Village
- Interactive map of Mohammadabad-e Saidabad
- Country: Iran
- Province: Yazd
- County: Taft
- Bakhsh: Central
- Rural District: Aliabad

Population (2006)
  - Total: 120
- Time zone: UTC+3:30 (IRST)
  - Summer (DST): UTC+4:30 (IRDT)

Mohammadabad-e Saidabad (Persian: محمدابادسعيداباد, romanized: Moḩmmadābād-e Sa‘īdābād), also known as Moḩmmadābād-e Şadrī, is a village in Aliabad Rural District, in the Central District of Taft County, Yazd Province, Iran. At the 2006 census, its population was 120, in 35 families.
