= Fudij =

Fudij فوديج
- Village
- Location within Iran
- Coordinates: 31°43′29″N 56°01′18″E
- Country: Iran
- Province: Yazd
- County: Behabad
- Bakhsh: Central
- Rural District: Banestan

Population (2006)
  - Total: 21
- Time zone: UTC+3:30 (IRST)
  - Summer (DST): UTC+4:30 (IRDT)

Fudij (Persian: فوديج, also Romanized as Fūdīj) is a village in Banestan Rural District, in the Central District of Behabad County, Yazd Province, Iran. At the 2006 census, its population was 21, in 12 families.
