= Muriabad =

Muriabad موري اباد
- Village
- Location within Iran
- Coordinates: 31°30′08″N 55°56′51″E
- Country: Iran
- Province: Yazd
- County: Bafq
- Bakhsh: Central
- Rural District: Sabzdasht

Population (2006)
  - Total: 68
- Time zone: UTC+3:30 (IRST)
  - Summer (DST): UTC+4:30 (IRDT)

Muriabad (Persian: موري اباد, also Romanized as Mūrīābād) is a village in Sabzdasht Rural District, in the Central District of Bafq County, Yazd Province, Iran. At the 2006 census, its population was 68, in 24 families.
