= Cheshmeh Now =

Cheshmeh Now چشمه نو
- Village
- Location within Iran
- Coordinates: 31°30′00″N 54°03′58″E
- Country: Iran
- Province: Yazd
- County: Taft
- Bakhsh: Nir
- Rural District: Sakhvid

Population (2006)
  - Total: 17
- Time zone: UTC+3:30 (IRST)
  - Summer (DST): UTC+4:30 (IRDT)

Cheshmeh Now (Persian: چشمه نو; also known as Maḩalleh-ye Cheshmeh Now and Tānk-e Cheshmeh Now) is a village in Sakhvid Rural District, Nir District, Taft County, Yazd Province, Iran. At the 2006 census, its population was 17, in 7 families.
