= Molkuh =

Molkuh ملكوه
- Village
- Location within Iran
- Coordinates: 32°22′10″N 53°35′40″E
- Country: Iran
- Province: Yazd
- County: Ardakan
- Bakhsh: Aqda
- Rural District: Narestan

Population (2006)
  - Total: 69
- Time zone: UTC+3:30 (IRST)
  - Summer (DST): UTC+4:30 (IRDT)

Molkuh (Persian: ملكوه, also Romanized as Molkūh, Malak Kūh, and Malek Kūh) is a village in Narestan Rural District, Aqda District, Ardakan County, Yazd Province, Iran. At the 2006 census, its population was 69, in 30 families.
