= Moghestan-e Akbar =

Moghestan-e Akbar مغستان اكبر
- Village
- Location within Iran
- Coordinates: 32°36′52″N 55°13′42″E
- Country: Iran
- Province: Yazd
- County: Ardakan
- Bakhsh: Kharanaq
- Rural District: Rabatat

Population (2006)
  - Total: 145
- Time zone: UTC+3:30 (IRST)
  - Summer (DST): UTC+4:30 (IRDT)

Moghestan-e Akbar (Persian: مغستان اكبر, also Romanized as Moghestān-e Akbar; also known as Moghestān) is a village in Rabatat Rural District, Kharanaq District, Ardakan County, Yazd Province, Iran. At the 2006 census, its population was 145, in 42 families.
