= Qaleh-ye Khan, Yazd =

Qaleh-ye Khan قلعه خان
- Village
- Location within Iran
- Coordinates: 31°39′32″N 54°00′02″E
- Country: Iran
- Province: Yazd
- County: Taft
- Bakhsh: Central
- Rural District: Pishkuh

Population (2006)
  - Total: 13
- Time zone: UTC+3:30 (IRST)
  - Summer (DST): UTC+4:30 (IRDT)

Qaleh-ye Khan (Persian: قلعه خان, also Romanized as Qal‘eh-ye Khān and Qal‘eh Khān) is a village in Pishkuh Rural District, in the Central District of Taft County, Yazd Province, Iran. At the 2006 census, its population was 13, in 7 families.
