= Khusef, Yazd =

Khusef خوسف
- Village
- Location within Iran
- Coordinates: 31°35′38″N 56°05′48″E
- Country: Iran
- Province: Yazd
- County: Bafq
- Bakhsh: Central
- Rural District: Sabzdasht

Population (2006)
  - Total: 77
- Time zone: UTC+3:30 (IRST)
  - Summer (DST): UTC+4:30 (IRDT)

Khusef (Persian: خوسف, also Romanized as Khūsef and Khūsf; also known as Husp) is a village in Sabzdasht Rural District, in the Central District of Bafq County, Yazd Province, Iran. At the 2006 census, its population was 77, in 30 families.
