= Atarabad =

Atrabad عطراباد
- village
- Location within Iran
- Coordinates: 32°23′48″N 53°46′57″E
- Country: Iran
- Province: Yazd
- County: Ardakan
- Bakhsh: Aqda
- Rural District: Aqda

Population (2006)
  - Total: 30
- Time zone: UTC+3:30 (IRST)
  - Summer (DST): UTC+4:30 (IRDT)

Etrabad (Persian: عطراباد, also Romanized as ʿEtrābād; also known as ) is a village in Aqda Rural District, Aqda District, Ardakan County, Yazd Province, Iran. At the 2006 census, its population was 30, in 10 families.

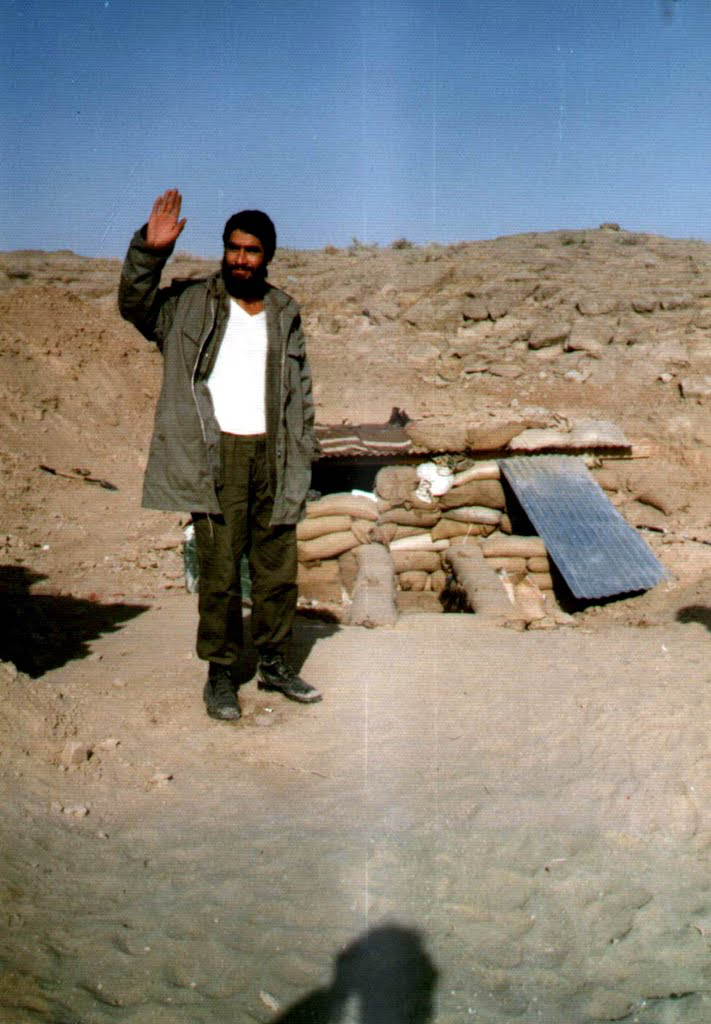

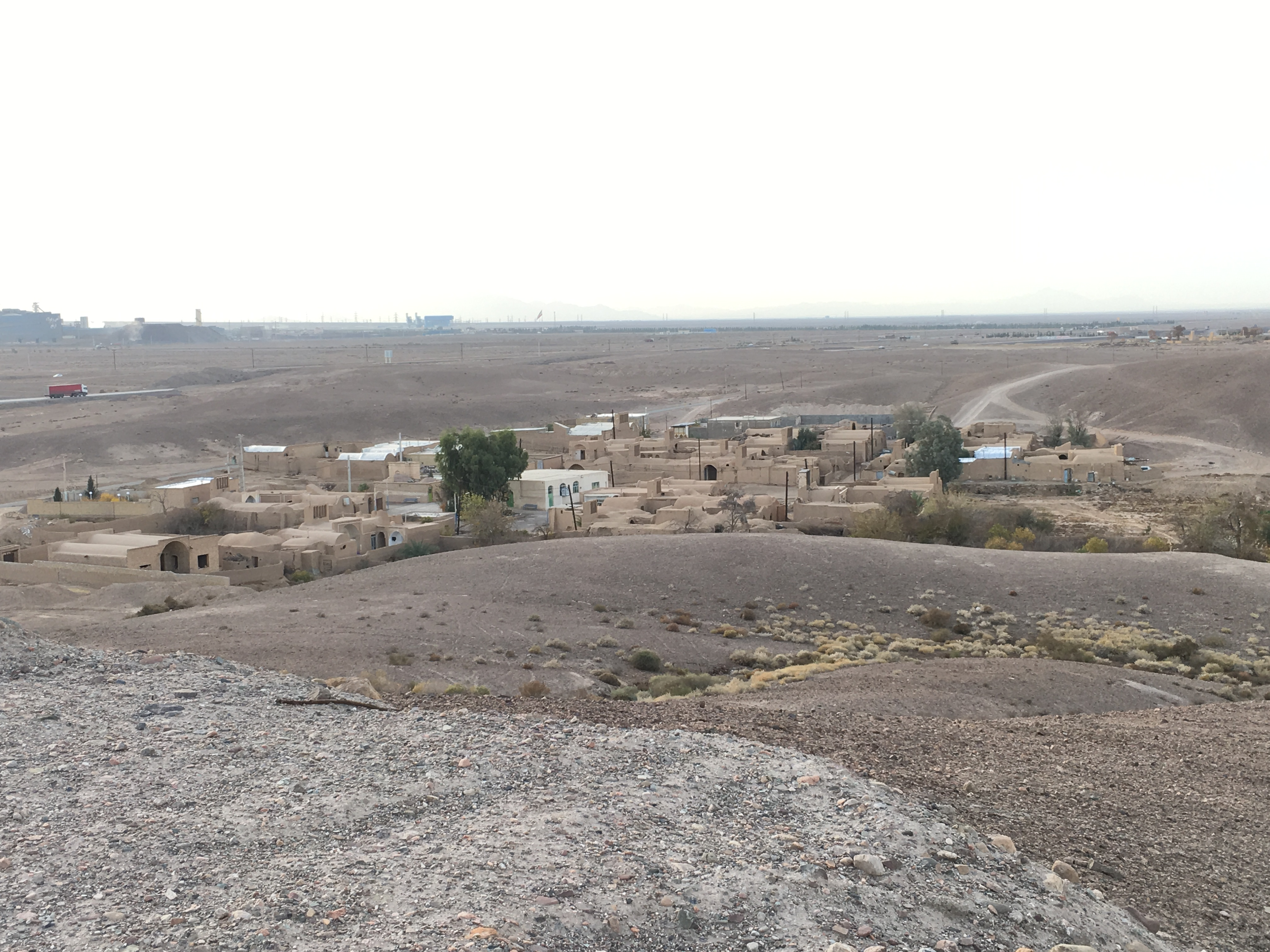

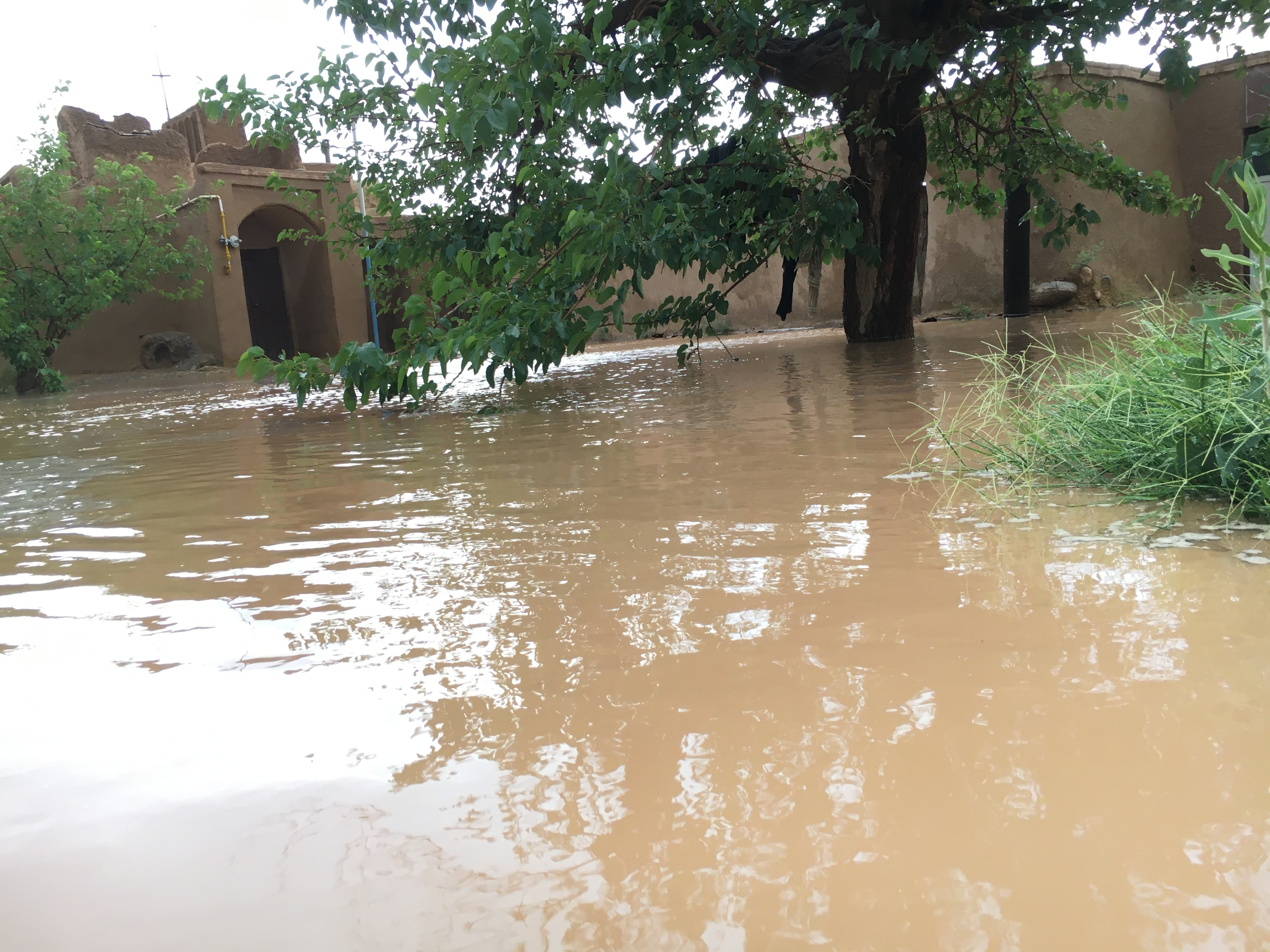
عطراباد
