= Babruiyeh =

Babruiyeh ببروئيه
- Village
- Location in Iran
- Coordinates: 31°40′29″N 56°05′42″E
- Country: Iran
- Province: Yazd
- County: Behabad
- Bakhsh: Central
- Rural District: Banestan

Population (2006)
  - Total: 61
- Time zone: UTC+3:30 (IRST)
  - Summer (DST): UTC+4:30 (IRDT)

Babruiyeh (Persian: ببروئيه, also Romanized as Babrū’īyeh and Babru’iyeh; also known as Bahrūd, and Bīrū’īyeh) is a village in Banestan Rural District, in the Central District of Behabad County, Yazd Province, Iran. At the 2006 census, its population was 61, in 20 families.
