= Baniz =

Baniz بنيز
- Village
- Location within Iran
- Coordinates: 31°40′07″N 56°03′49″E
- Country: Iran
- Province: Yazd
- County: Behabad
- Bakhsh: Central
- Rural District: Banestan

Population (2006)
  - Total: 133
- Time zone: UTC+3:30 (IRST)
  - Summer (DST): UTC+4:30 (IRDT)

Baniz (Persian: بنيز, also Romanized as Banīz; also known as Vaniz) is a village in Banestan Rural District, in the Central District of Behabad County, Yazd Province, Iran. At the 2006 census, its population was 133, in 64 families.
