= Mohammad Jani =

Mohammad Jani محمدجاني
- Village
- Location within Iran
- Coordinates: 31°17′38″N 54°05′14″E
- Country: Iran
- Province: Yazd
- County: Taft
- Bakhsh: Nir
- Rural District: Garizat

Population (2006)
  - Total: 15
- Time zone: UTC+3:30 (IRST)
  - Summer (DST): UTC+4:30 (IRDT)

Mohammad Jani (Persian: محمدجاني, also Romanized as Moḩammad Jānī and Moḩammadjānī) is a village in Garizat Rural District, Nir District, Taft County, Yazd Province, Iran. As of the 2006 census, its population was 15, in 6 families.
