= Bujru =

Bujru بوجرو
- Village
- Location within Iran
- Coordinates: 31°26′13″N 54°17′13″E
- Country: Iran
- Province: Yazd
- County: Mehriz
- Bakhsh: Central
- Rural District: Tang Chenar

Population (2006)
  - Total: 29
- Time zone: UTC+3:30 (IRST)
  - Summer (DST): UTC+4:30 (IRDT)

Bujru (Persian: بوجرو, also Romanized as Būjrū; also known as Borj Rū and Būjūrū) is a village in Tang Chenar Rural District, in the Central District of Mehriz County, Yazd Province, Iran. At the 2006 census, its population was 29, in 12 families.
