= Ashtijeh =

Ashtijeh اشتيجه
- Village
- Location within Iran
- Coordinates: 32°22′58″N 53°32′53″E
- Country: Iran
- Province: Yazd
- County: Ardakan
- Bakhsh: Aqda
- Rural District: Narestan

Population (2006)
  - Total: 64
- Time zone: UTC+3:30 (IRST)
  - Summer (DST): UTC+4:30 (IRDT)

Ashtijeh (Persian: اشتيجه, also Romanized as Ashtījeh; also known as Ashnījeh, Ashtejeh, and Eshījeh) is a village in Narestan Rural District, Aqda District, Ardakan County, Yazd Province, Iran. At the 2006 census, its population was 64, in 28 families.
