= Ostorij =

Ostorij استريج
- Village
- Location within Iran
- Coordinates: 31°30′09″N 54°03′18″E
- Country: Iran
- Province: Yazd
- County: Taft
- Bakhsh: Nir
- Rural District: Sakhvid

Population (2006)
  - Total: 47
- Time zone: UTC+3:30 (IRST)
  - Summer (DST): UTC+4:30 (IRDT)

Ostorij (Persian: استريج, also Romanized as Ostorīj; also known as Esterīch, Maḩalleh-ye Osrīj, and Osţorīch) is a village in Sakhvid Rural District, Nir District, Taft County, Yazd Province, Iran. At the 2006 census, its population was 47, in 21 families.
