= Saduyeh =

Saduyeh سعدويه
- Village
- Location within Iran
- Coordinates: 29°47′38″N 54°14′05″E
- Country: Iran
- Province: Yazd
- County: Khatam
- Bakhsh: Central
- Rural District: Chahak

Population (2006)
  - Total: 20
- Time zone: UTC+3:30 (IRST)
  - Summer (DST): UTC+4:30 (IRDT)

Saduyeh (Persian: سعدويه, also Romanized as Sa‘dūyeh; also known as Sa‘doo) is a village in Chahak Rural District, in the Central District of Khatam County, Yazd Province, Iran. At the 2006 census, its population was 20, in 7 families.
