= Darreh-ye Zereshk =

Darreh-ye Zereshk دره زرشك
- Village
- Location within Iran
- Coordinates: 31°33′50″N 53°50′43″E
- Country: Iran
- Province: Yazd
- County: Taft
- Bakhsh: Central
- Rural District: Dehshir

Population (2006)
  - Total: 71
- Time zone: UTC+3:30 (IRST)
  - Summer (DST): UTC+4:30 (IRDT)

Darreh-ye Zereshk (Persian: دره زرشك, also Romanized as Darrehzereshk) is a village in Dehshir Rural District, in the Central District of Taft County, Yazd Province, Iran. At the 2006 census, its population was 71, in 31 families.
