= Rameh Kuh =

Rameh Kuh رمه كوه
- Village
- Location within Iran
- Coordinates: 31°46′18″N 53°48′41″E
- Country: Iran
- Province: Yazd
- County: Taft
- Bakhsh: Central
- Rural District: Nasrabad

Population (2006)
  - Total: 72
- Time zone: UTC+3:30 (IRST)
  - Summer (DST): UTC+4:30 (IRDT)

Rameh Kuh (Persian: رمه كوه, also Romanized as Rameh Kūh; also known as Ramekān) is a village in Nasrabad Rural District, in the Central District of Taft County, Yazd Province, Iran. At the 2006 census, its population was 72, in 22 families.
