= Radabad =

Radabad رعداباد
- Village
- Location within Iran
- Coordinates: 31°17′47″N 54°04′54″E
- Country: Iran
- Province: Yazd
- County: Taft
- Bakhsh: Nir
- Rural District: Garizat

Population (2006)
  - Total: 135
- Time zone: UTC+3:30 (IRST)
  - Summer (DST): UTC+4:30 (IRDT)

Radabad (Persian: رعداباد, also Romanized as Ra‘dābād) is a village in Garizat Rural District, Nir District, Taft County, Yazd Province, Iran. At the 2006 census, its population was 135, in 34 families.
