= Homijan =

Homijan هميجان
- Village
- Location within Iran
- Coordinates: 31°45′55″N 55°58′33″E
- Country: Iran
- Province: Yazd
- County: Behabad
- Bakhsh: Central
- Rural District: Banestan

Population (2006)
  - Total: 68
- Time zone: UTC+3:30 (IRST)
  - Summer (DST): UTC+4:30 (IRDT)

Homijan (Persian: هميجان, also Romanized as Homījān and Ḩāmī Jān) is a village in Banestan Rural District, in the Central District of Behabad County, Yazd Province, Iran. At the 2006 census, its population was 68, in 24 families.
