= Rahimabad, Garizat =

Rahimabad رحيم اباد
- Village
- Location within Iran
- Coordinates: 31°19′34″N 54°05′21″E
- Country: Iran
- Province: Yazd
- County: Taft
- Bakhsh: Nir
- Rural District: Garizat

Population (2006)
  - Total: 322
- Time zone: UTC+3:30 (IRST)
  - Summer (DST): UTC+4:30 (IRDT)

Rahimabad (Persian: رحيم اباد, also Romanized as Raḩīmābād) is a village in Garizat District, Garizat, Taft County, Yazd Province, Iran. At the 2006 census, its population was 322, in 79 families.
