= Shah Neshin, Yazd =

Shah Neshin شاه نشين
- Village
- Location within Iran
- Coordinates: 31°31′48″N 53°48′00″E
- Country: Iran
- Province: Yazd
- County: Taft
- Bakhsh: Central
- Rural District: Dehshir

Population (2006)
  - Total: 12
- Time zone: UTC+3:30 (IRST)
  - Summer (DST): UTC+4:30 (IRDT)

Shah Neshin (Persian: شاه نشين, also Romanized as Shāh Neshīn) is a village in Dehshir Rural District, in the Central District of Taft County, Yazd Province, Iran. At the 2006 census, its population was 12, made up by 5 families.
