= Rahmatabad, Abarkuh =

Rahmatabad رحمت اباد
- Village
- Location within Iran
- Coordinates: 30°59′39″N 53°22′46″E
- Country: Iran
- Province: Yazd
- County: Abarkuh
- Bakhsh: Bahman
- Rural District: Esfandar

Population (2006)
  - Total: 120
- Time zone: UTC+3:30 (IRST)
  - Summer (DST): UTC+4:30 (IRDT)

Rahmatabad (Persian: رحمت اباد, also Romanized as Raḩmatābād; also known as Raḩmābād) is a village in Esfandar Rural District, Bahman District, Abarkuh County, Yazd Province, Iran. At the 2006 census, its population was 120, in 23 families.
