= Gavijak =

Gavijak گويجك
- Village
- Location within Iran
- Coordinates: 31°28′20″N 54°07′44″E
- Country: Iran
- Province: Yazd
- County: Taft
- Bakhsh: Nir
- Rural District: Sakhvid

Population (2006)
  - Total: 13
- Time zone: UTC+3:30 (IRST)
  - Summer (DST): UTC+4:30 (IRDT)

Gavijak (Persian: گويجك, also Romanized as Gavījak; also known as Gavīchak) is a village in Sakhvid Rural District, Nir District, Taft County, Yazd Province, Iran. At the 2006 census, its population was 13, in 5 families.
