= Simkuiyeh =

Simkuiyeh سيمكوئيه
- Village
- Location within Iran
- Coordinates: 31°42′29″N 56°12′09″E
- Country: Iran
- Province: Yazd
- County: Behabad
- Bakhsh: Asfyj
- Rural District: Asfyj

Population (2006)
  - Total: 143
- Time zone: UTC+3:30 (IRST)
  - Summer (DST): UTC+4:30 (IRDT)

Simkuiyeh (Persian: سيمكوئيه, also Romanized as Sīmkū’īyeh; also known as Semkūeeyeh) is a village in Asfyj Rural District, Asfyj District, Behabad County, Yazd Province, Iran. At the 2006 census, its population was 143, in 40 families.
