= Soltanabad, Yazd =

Soltanabad سلطان اباد
- Village
- Location within Iran
- Coordinates: 31°45′00″N 54°01′00″E
- Country: Iran
- Province: Yazd
- County: Taft
- Bakhsh: Central
- Rural District: Aliabad

Population (2006)
  - Total: 65
- Time zone: UTC+3:30 (IRST)
  - Summer (DST): UTC+4:30 (IRDT)

Soltanabad (Persian: سلطان اباد, romanized: Solţānābād) is a village in Aliabad Rural District, in the Central District of Taft County, Yazd Province, Iran. At the 2006 census, its population was 65, in 22 families.
