= Khamsian =

Khamsian خمسيان
- Village
- Location within Iran
- Coordinates: 31°54′31″N 53°47′52″E
- Country: Iran
- Province: Yazd
- County: Saduq
- Bakhsh: Khezrabad
- Rural District: Kezab

Population (2006)
  - Total: 185
- Time zone: UTC+3:30 (IRST)
  - Summer (DST): UTC+4:30 (IRDT)

Khamsian (Persian: خمسيان, also Romanized as Khamsīān and Kham Sīān; also known as Mazra‘eh-ye Khām Sīāh) is a village in Kezab Rural District, Khezrabad District, Saduq County, Yazd Province, Iran. At the 2006 census, its population was 185, in 50 families.
