= Mahdiabad, Aliabad =

Mahdiabad مهدي اباد
- Village
- Location within Iran
- Coordinates: 31°37′35″N 53°53′05″E
- Country: Iran
- Province: Yazd
- County: Taft
- Bakhsh: Central
- Rural District: Aliabad

Population (2006)
  - Total: 18
- Time zone: UTC+3:30 (IRST)
  - Summer (DST): UTC+4:30 (IRDT)

Mahdiabad (Persian: مهدي اباد, romanized: Mahdīābād) is a village in Aliabad Rural District, in the Central District of Taft County, Yazd Province, Iran. At the 2006 census, its population was 18, in 7 families.
