= Deh-e Mohammad Rafi =

Deh-e Mohammad Rafi ده محمدرفيع
- Village
- Location within Iran
- Coordinates: 32°01′39″N 55°56′55″E
- Country: Iran
- Province: Yazd
- County: Behabad
- Bakhsh: Central
- Rural District: Jolgeh

Population (2006)
  - Total: 113
- Time zone: UTC+3:30 (IRST)
  - Summer (DST): UTC+4:30 (IRDT)

Deh-e Mohammad Rafi (Persian: ده محمدرفيع, also Romanized as Deh-e Moḩammad Rafī‘) is a village in Jolgeh Rural District, in the Central District of Behabad County, Yazd Province, Iran. At the 2006 census, its population was 113, in 31 families.
