= Bardestan, Yazd =

Bardestan بردستان
- Village
- Location within Iran
- Coordinates: 31°34′45″N 54°01′15″E
- Country: Iran
- Province: Yazd
- County: Taft
- Bakhsh: Central
- Rural District: Pishkuh

Population (2006)
  - Total: 88
- Time zone: UTC+3:30 (IRST)
  - Summer (DST): UTC+4:30 (IRDT)

Bardestan (Persian: بردستان, also Romanized as Bardestān) is a village in Pishkuh Rural District, in the Central District of Taft County, Yazd Province, Iran. At the 2006 census, its population was 88, in 38 families.
