= Zirkuiyeh =

Zirkuiyeh زيركوييه
- Village
- Location within Iran
- Coordinates: 31°42′34″N 56°12′07″E
- Country: Iran
- Province: Yazd
- County: Behabad
- Bakhsh: Asfyj
- Rural District: Asfyj

Population (2006)
  - Total: 213
- Time zone: UTC+3:30 (IRST)
  - Summer (DST): UTC+4:30 (IRDT)

Zirkuiyeh (Persian: زيركوييه, also Romanized as Zīrkū’īyeh; also known as Samkū’īyeh, Sertesh Chaqū, Sertschu, and Som Ku’iyeh) is a village in Asfyj Rural District, Asfyj District, Behabad County, Yazd Province, Iran. At the 2006 census, its population was 213, in 49 families.
