= Tang-e Adhaneh =

Tang-e Adhaneh تنگادهانه
- Village
- Country: Iran
- Province: Yazd
- County: Taft
- Bakhsh: Central
- Rural District: Dehshir

Population (2006)
  - Total: 21
- Time zone: UTC+3:30 (IRST)
  - Summer (DST): UTC+4:30 (IRDT)

Tang-e Adhaneh (Persian: تنگادهانه, also Romanized as Tang-e Ādhāneh) is a village in Dehshir Rural District, in the Central District of Taft County, Yazd Province, Iran. At the 2006 census, its population was 21, in 6 families.
