= Kharv-e Sofla =

Kharv-e Sofla خروسفلي
- Village
- Location within Iran
- Coordinates: 33°38′22″N 57°09′19″E
- Country: Iran
- Province: South Khorasan
- County: Tabas
- Bakhsh: Central
- Rural District: Golshan

Population (2006)
  - Total: 20
- Time zone: UTC+3:30 (IRST)
  - Summer (DST): UTC+4:30 (IRDT)

Kharv-e Sofla (Persian: خروسفلي, also Romanized as Kharv-e Soflá; also known as Kharv-e Pā’īn) is a village in Golshan Rural District, in the Central District of Tabas County, South Khorasan Province, Iran. At the 2006 census, its population was 20, in 7 families.
