= Aliabad-e Sadri =

Aliabad-e Sadri علي ابادصدري
- Village
- Location within Iran
- Coordinates: 31°39′16″N 53°52′40″E
- Country: Iran
- Province: Yazd
- County: Taft
- Bakhsh: Central
- Rural District: Aliabad

Population (2006)
  - Total: 66
- Time zone: UTC+3:30 (IRST)
  - Summer (DST): UTC+4:30 (IRDT)

Aliabad-e Sadri (Persian: علي ابادصدري, romanized: ‘Alīābād-e Şadrī) is a village in Aliabad Rural District, in the Central District of Taft County, Yazd Province, Iran. At the 2006 census, its population was 66, in 28 families.
