= Bagh Dar =

Bagh Dar باغدر
- Village
- Location within Iran
- Coordinates: 31°44′28″N 55°54′42″E
- Country: Iran
- Province: Yazd
- County: Bafq
- Bakhsh: Central
- Rural District: Kushk

Population (2006)
  - Total: 61
- Time zone: UTC+3:30 (IRST)
  - Summer (DST): UTC+4:30 (IRDT)

Bagh Dar (Persian: باغدر, also Romanized as Bāgh Dar) is a village in Kushk Rural District, in the Central District of Bafq County, Yazd Province, Iran. At the 2006 census, its population was 61, in 21 families.
