= Mansurabad, Taft =

Mansurabad منصوراباد
- Village
- Location within Iran
- Coordinates: 31°35′00″N 53°46′00″E
- Country: Iran
- Province: Yazd
- County: Taft
- Bakhsh: Central
- Rural District: Dehshir

Population (2006)
  - Total: 25
- Time zone: UTC+3:30 (IRST)
  - Summer (DST): UTC+4:30 (IRDT)

Mansurabad (Persian: منصوراباد, also Romanized as Manşūrābād and Mansoor Abad; also known as Manaūrābād) is a village in Dehshir Rural District, in the Central District of Taft County, Yazd Province, Iran. At the 2006 census, its population was 25, in 11 families.
