= Heruk =

Heruk هروك
- Village
- Location within Iran
- Coordinates: 31°10′13″N 53°13′01″E
- Country: Iran
- Province: Yazd
- County: Abarkuh
- Bakhsh: Central
- Rural District: Tirjerd

Population (2006)
  - Total: 420
- Time zone: UTC+3:30 (IRST)
  - Summer (DST): UTC+4:30 (IRDT)

Heruk (Persian: هروك, also Romanized as Herūk, Harook, and Harūk; also known as Horok, Howrūk, and Hūrūk) is a village in Tirjerd Rural District, in the Central District of Abarkuh County, Yazd Province, Iran. At the 2006 census, its population was 420, in 107 families.
