= Lay-e Shuruneh =

Lay-e Shuruneh لاي شورونه
- Village
- Location within Iran
- Coordinates: 31°31′42″N 54°03′41″E
- Country: Iran
- Province: Yazd
- County: Taft
- Bakhsh: Central
- Rural District: Pishkuh

Population (2006)
  - Total: 9
- Time zone: UTC+3:30 (IRST)
  - Summer (DST): UTC+4:30 (IRDT)

Lay-e Shuruneh (Persian: لاي شورونه, also Romanized as Lāy-e Shūrūneh; also known as Lāy-e Shīrūneh) is a village in Pishkuh Rural District, in the Central District of Taft County, Yazd Province, Iran. At the 2006 census, its population was 9, in 4 families.
