= Mahmudabad-e Nasri =

Mahmudabad-e Nasri محمودابادناصري
- Village
- Location within Iran
- Coordinates: 31°29′24″N 53°57′03″E
- country: Iran
- Province: Yazd
- County: Taft
- Bakhsh: Nir
- Rural District: Banadkuk

Population (2006)
  - Total: 15
- Time zone: UTC+3:30 (IRST)
  - Summer (DST): UTC+4:30 (IRDT)

Mahmudabad-e Nasri (Persian: محمودابادناصري, also Romanized as Maḩmūdābād-e Nāşrī; also known as Maḩmūdābād) is a village in Banadkuk Rural District, Nir District, Taft County, Yazd Province, Iran. At the 2006 census, its population was 15, in 4 families.
