= Genegav =

Genegav گن گاو
- Village
- Location within Iran
- Coordinates: 31°48′00″N 56°00′00″E
- Country: Iran
- Province: Yazd
- County: Behabad
- Bakhsh: Central
- Rural District: Banestan

Population (2006)
  - Total: 9
- Time zone: UTC+3:30 (IRST)
  - Summer (DST): UTC+4:30 (IRDT)

Genegav (Persian: گن گاو, also Romanized as Genegāv) is a village in Banestan Rural District, in the Central District of Behabad County, Yazd Province, Iran. At the 2006 census, its population was 9, in 6 families.
