= Lay-e Ahmad =

Lay-e Ahmad لاي احمد
- Village
- Country: Iran
- Province: Yazd
- County: Taft
- Bakhsh: Central
- Rural District: Pishkuh

Population (2006)
  - Total: 13
- Time zone: UTC+3:30 (IRST)
  - Summer (DST): UTC+4:30 (IRDT)

Lay-e Ahmad (Persian: لاي احمد, also Romanized as Lāy-e Aḩmad) is a village in Pishkuh Rural District, in the Central District of Taft County, Yazd Province, Iran. At the 2006 census, its population was 13, in 4 families.
