= Panahkuh =

Panahkuh پناه كوه
- Village
- Location within Iran
- Coordinates: 31°56′37″N 53°45′53″E
- Country: Iran
- Province: Yazd
- County: Saduq
- Bakhsh: Khezrabad
- Rural District: Kezab

Population (2006)
  - Total: 40
- Time zone: UTC+3:30 (IRST)
  - Summer (DST): UTC+4:30 (IRDT)

Panahkuh (Persian: پناه كوه, also Romanized as Panāhkūh and Penāhkūh) is a village in Kezab Rural District, Khezrabad District, Saduq County, Yazd Province, Iran. At the 2006 census, its population was 40, in 10 families.
