= Saidabad, Yazd =

Saidabad سعيداباد
- Village
- Location within Iran
- Coordinates: 31°39′19″N 53°52′49″E
- Country: Iran
- Province: Yazd
- County: Taft
- Bakhsh: Central
- Rural District: Aliabad

Population (2006)
  - Total: 61
- Time zone: UTC+3:30 (IRST)
  - Summer (DST): UTC+4:30 (IRDT)

Saidabad (Persian: سعيداباد, romanized: Sa‘īdābād or Saeedābād) is a village in Aliabad Rural District, in the Central District of Taft County, Yazd Province, Iran. At the 2006 census, its population was 61, in 21 families.
