= Deh-e Jamal =

Deh-e Jamal ده جمال
- Village
- Location within Iran
- Coordinates: 31°41′21″N 56°09′38″E
- Country: Iran
- Province: Yazd
- County: Behabad
- Bakhsh: Asfyj
- Rural District: Asfyj

Population (2006)
  - Total: 240
- Time zone: UTC+3:30 (IRST)
  - Summer (DST): UTC+4:30 (IRDT)

Deh-e Jamal (Persian: ده جمال, also Romanized as Deh-e Jamāl) is a village in Asfyj Rural District, Asfyj District, Behabad County, Yazd Province, Iran. At the 2006 census, its population was 240, in 66 families.
