= Senjedak, Behabad =

Senjedak سنجدك
- Village
- Location within Iran
- Coordinates: 31°50′10″N 55°48′51″E
- Country: Iran
- Province: Yazd
- County: Behabad
- Bakhsh: Central
- Rural District: Jolgeh

Population (2006)
  - Total: 150
- Time zone: UTC+3:30 (IRST)
  - Summer (DST): UTC+4:30 (IRDT)

Senjedak (Persian: سنجدك, also Romanized as Senjedk; also known as Senjak) is a village in Jolgeh Rural District, in the Central District of Behabad County, Yazd Province, Iran. At the 2006 census, its population was 150, in 51 families.
