= Taqiabad, Abarkuh =

Taqiabad تقی‌آباد
- Village
- Location within Iran
- Coordinates: 30°57′19″N 53°24′48″E
- Country: Iran
- Province: Yazd
- County: Abarkuh
- Bakhsh: Bahman
- Rural District: Esfandar

Population (2006)
  - Total: 255
- Time zone: UTC+3:30 (IRST)
  - Summer (DST): UTC+4:30 (IRDT)

Taqiabad (Persian: تقی‌آباد, also Romanized as Taqīābād; also known as Takīābād) is a village in Esfandar Rural District, Bahman District, Abarkuh County, Yazd Province, Iran. At the 2006 census, its population was 255, in 66 families.
