= Hajji Hoseyn =

Hajji Hoseyn حاجي حسين
- Village
- Country: Iran
- Province: Yazd
- County: Taft
- Bakhsh: Central
- Rural District: Dehshir

Population (2006)
  - Total: 12
- Time zone: UTC+3:30 (IRST)
  - Summer (DST): UTC+4:30 (IRDT)

Hajji Hoseyn (Persian: حاجي حسين, also Romanized as Ḩājjī Ḩoseyn) is a village in Dehshir Rural District, in the Central District of Taft County, Yazd Province, Iran. At the 2006 census, its population was 12, in 4 families.
