= Patkestan =

Matkestan متكستان
- village
- Location within Iran
- Coordinates: 32°31′48″N 54°28′12″E
- Country: Iran
- Province: Yazd
- County: Ardakan
- Bakhsh: Kharanaq
- Rural District: Zarrin

Population (2006)
  - Total: 13
- Time zone: UTC+3:30 (IRST)
  - Summer (DST): UTC+4:30 (IRDT)

Patkestan (Persian: متكستان), also Romanized as Matkestān, is a village in Zarrin Rural District, Kharanaq District, Ardakan County, Yazd Province, Iran. At the 2006 census, its population was 13, in 7 families.
