= Tak Baghestan =

Tak Baghestan تك باغستان
- Village
- Location within Iran
- Coordinates: 31°47′00″N 55°58′00″E
- Country: Iran
- Province: Yazd
- County: Behabad
- Bakhsh: Central
- Rural District: Banestan

Population (2006)
  - Total: 8
- Time zone: UTC+3:30 (IRST)
  - Summer (DST): UTC+4:30 (IRDT)

Tak Baghestan (Persian: تك باغستان, also Romanized as Tak Bāghestān) is a village in Banestan Rural District, in the Central District of Behabad County, Yazd Province, Iran. At the 2006 census, its population was 8, in 4 families.
