= Darb Has =

Darb Has دربحص
- Village
- Location within Iran
- Coordinates: 31°48′43″N 54°04′18″E
- Country: Iran
- Province: Yazd
- County: Saduq
- Bakhsh: Khezrabad
- Rural District: Kezab

Population (2006)
  - Total: 45
- Time zone: UTC+3:30 (IRST)
  - Summer (DST): UTC+4:30 (IRDT)

Darb Has (Persian: دربحص, also Romanized as Darb Ḩaş; also known as Darb-e ’aş and Dar-e Ras) is a village in Kezab Rural District, Khezrabad District, Saduq County, Yazd Province, Iran. At the 2006 census, its population was 45, in 20 families.
