= Sherkat-e Sahami Mehr =

Sherkat-e Sahami Mehr شركت سهامي مهر
- Village
- Country: Iran
- Province: Yazd
- County: Yazd
- Bakhsh: Central
- Rural District: Fahraj

Population (2006)
  - Total: 135
- Time zone: UTC+3:30 (IRST)
  - Summer (DST): UTC+4:30 (IRDT)

Sherkat-e Sahami Mehr (Persian: شركت سهامي مهر, also Romanized as Sherkat-e Sahāmī Mehr) is a village in Fahraj Rural District, in the Central District of Yazd County, Yazd Province, Iran. At the 2006 census, its population was 135, in 25 families.
