= Bar Kuiyeh =

Bar Kuiyeh بركوييه
- Village
- Location within Iran
- Coordinates: 31°31′11″N 55°56′06″E
- Country: Iran
- Province: Yazd
- County: Bafq
- Bakhsh: Central
- Rural District: Sabzdasht

Population (2006)
  - Total: 98
- Time zone: UTC+3:30 (IRST)
  - Summer (DST): UTC+4:30 (IRDT)

Bar Kuiyeh (Persian: بركوييه, also Romanized as Bar Kū’īyeh) is a village in Sabzdasht Rural District, in the Central District of Bafq County, Yazd Province, Iran. At the 2006 census, its population was 98, in 45 families.
