= Shamsabad, Taft =

Shamsabad شمس اباد
- Village
- Location within Iran
- Coordinates: 31°43′13″N 53°38′49″E
- Country: Iran
- Province: Yazd
- County: Taft
- Bakhsh: Central
- Rural District: Nasrabad

Population (2006)
  - Total: 25
- Time zone: UTC+3:30 (IRST)
  - Summer (DST): UTC+4:30 (IRDT)

Shamsabad (Persian: شمس اباد, romanized: Shamsābād) is a village in Nasrabad Rural District, in the Central District of Taft County, Yazd province, Iran. At the 2006 census, its population was 25, in 8 families.
