= Sarv-e Olya =

Sarv-e Olya سروعليا
- Village
- Location within Iran
- Coordinates: 32°19′40″N 53°22′22″E
- Country: Iran
- Province: Yazd
- County: Ardakan
- Bakhsh: Aqda
- Rural District: Narestan

Population (2006)
  - Total: 165
- Time zone: UTC+3:30 (IRST)
  - Summer (DST): UTC+4:30 (IRDT)

Sarv-e Ol'ya (Persian: سروعليا, also Romanized as Sarv-e ‘Ol'yā; also known as Sarv, Sarv-e Bālā, Serv, and Sīrv) is a village in Narestan Rural District, Aqda District, Ardakan County, Yazd Province, Iran. At the 2006 census, its population was 165, in 58 families.

The aqueduct and water of Sarv-e ol'ya village have always been the site of disputes between different people; The village has 168 hours of water from its ancient aqueduct, all of which for many years belonged to the Beyki Sarv-e ol'ya family, who were three brothers at the time.

56 hours of this water has been dedicated more than 100 years ago with valid endowments, and now more than three hours have been confiscated by some people in the village.
