= Kam Kuh =

Kam Kuh كمكوه
- Village
- Location within Iran
- Coordinates: 32°23′51″N 53°33′48″E
- Country: Iran
- Province: Yazd
- County: Ardakan
- Bakhsh: Aqda
- Rural District: Narestan

Population (2006)
  - Total: 61
- Time zone: UTC+3:30 (IRST)
  - Summer (DST): UTC+4:30 (IRDT)

Kam Kuh (Persian: كمكوه, also Romanized as Kam Kūh; also known as Konkūsh) is a village in Narestan Rural District, Aqda District, Ardakan County, Yazd Province, Iran. At the 2006 census, its population was 61, in 20 families.
