= Kheskok =

Kheskok خسكك
- Village
- Location within Iran
- Coordinates: 31°30′32″N 54°04′26″E
- Country: Iran
- Province: Yazd
- County: Taft
- Bakhsh: Nir
- Rural District: Sakhvid

Population (2006)
  - Total: 123
- Time zone: UTC+3:30 (IRST)
  - Summer (DST): UTC+4:30 (IRDT)

Kheskok (Persian: خسكك, also Romanized as Khoskak; also known as Khesok and Khosok) is a village in Sakhvid Rural District, Nir District, Taft County, Yazd Province, Iran. At the 2006 census, its population was 123, in 31 families.
