= Chenar-e Naz =

Chenar-e Naz چنارناز
- Village
- Location within Iran
- Coordinates: 30°05′28″N 53°59′40″E
- Country: Iran
- Province: Yazd
- County: Khatam
- Bakhsh: Marvast
- Rural District: Isar

Population (2006)
  - Total: 509
- Time zone: UTC+3:30 (IRST)
  - Summer (DST): UTC+4:30 (IRDT)

Chenar-e Naz (Persian: چنارناز, also Romanized as Chenār-e Nāz and Chenār Nāz; also known as Chenār Nār) is a village in Isar Rural District, Marvast District, Khatam County, Yazd Province, Iran.

In 2006, the village had a population of 144 families, totalling 509 individuals.
