= Band-e Chenar =

Band-e Chenar بندچنار
- Village
- Location within Iran
- Coordinates: 29°54′53″N 54°07′40″E
- Country: Iran
- Province: Yazd
- County: Khatam
- Bakhsh: Central
- Rural District: Fathabad

Population (2006)
  - Total: 20
- Time zone: UTC+3:30 (IRST)
  - Summer (DST): UTC+4:30 (IRDT)

Band-e Chenar (Persian: بندچنار, also Romanized as Band-e Chenār and Band-i-Chenār) is a village in Fathabad Rural District, in the Central District of Khatam County, Yazd Province, Iran. At the 2006 census, its population was 20, in 6 families.
