= Rasti, Iran =

Rasti راستي
- Village
- Location within Iran
- Coordinates: 31°30′29″N 54°04′41″E
- Country: Iran
- Province: Yazd
- County: Taft
- Bakhsh: Nir
- Rural District: Sakhvid

Population (2006)
  - Total: 60
- Time zone: UTC+3:30 (IRST)
  - Summer (DST): UTC+4:30 (IRDT)

Rasti (Persian: راستي, also Romanized as Rāstī; also known as Maḩalleh-ye Rāstī) is a village in Sakhvid Rural District, Nir District, Taft County, Yazd Province, Iran. At the 2006 census, its population was 60, in 24 families.
