= Sangab, South Khorasan =

Sangab سنگاب
- Village
- Location within Iran
- Coordinates: 33°02′06″N 57°41′27″E
- Country: Iran
- Province: South Khorasan
- County: Tabas
- Bakhsh: Deyhuk
- Rural District: Kavir

Population (2006)
  - Total: 12
- Time zone: UTC+3:30 (IRST)
  - Summer (DST): UTC+4:30 (IRDT)

Sangab (Persian: سنگاب, also Romanized as Sangāb) is a village in Kavir Rural District, Deyhuk District, Tabas County, South Khorasan Province, Iran. At the 2006 census, its population was 12, in 6 families.
