= Payaneh-ye Bar Yazd =

Payaneh-ye Bar Yazd پايانه باريزد
- Village
- Country: Iran
- Province: Yazd
- County: Yazd
- Bakhsh: Central
- Rural District: Fajr

Population (2006)
  - Total: 13
- Time zone: UTC+3:30 (IRST)
  - Summer (DST): UTC+4:30 (IRDT)

Payaneh-ye Bar Yazd (Persian: پايانه باريزد, also Romanized as Pāyāneh-ye Bār Yazd) is a village in Fajr Rural District, in the Central District of Yazd County, Yazd Province, Iran. At the 2006 census, its population was 13, in 4 families.
