= Jowriz =

Jowriz جوريز
- Village
- Location within Iran
- Coordinates: 33°34′46″N 56°53′39″E
- Country: Iran
- Province: South Khorasan
- County: Tabas
- Bakhsh: Central
- Rural District: Golshan

Population (2006)
  - Total: 29
- Time zone: UTC+3:30 (IRST)
  - Summer (DST): UTC+4:30 (IRDT)

Jowriz (Persian: جوريز, also Romanized as Jowrīz; also known as Chow Rīz and Chowrīz) is a village in Golshan Rural District, in the Central District of Tabas County, South Khorasan Province, Iran. At the 2006 census, its population was 29, in 7 families.
