= Chah Alahiyeh, Mehriz =

Chah Alahiyeh چاه الهيه
- Village
- Country: Iran
- Province: Yazd
- County: Mehriz
- Bakhsh: Central
- Rural District: Bahadoran

Population (2006)
  - Total: 12
- Time zone: UTC+3:30 (IRST)
  - Summer (DST): UTC+4:30 (IRDT)

Chah Alahiyeh (Persian: چاه الهيه, also Romanized as Chāh Ālahīyeh; also known as Chāh-e Khowīd Kīhā) is a village in Bahadoran Rural District, in the Central District of Mehriz County, Yazd Province, Iran. At the 2006 census, its population was 12, in 4 families.
