= Nad Kuh-e Olya =

Nad Kuh-e Olya ندكوه عليا
- Village
- Location within Iran
- Coordinates: 31°43′38″N 55°53′54″E
- Country: Iran
- Province: Yazd
- County: Bafq
- Bakhsh: Central
- Rural District: Kushk

Population (2006)
  - Total: 22
- Time zone: UTC+3:30 (IRST)
  - Summer (DST): UTC+4:30 (IRDT)

Nad Kuh-e Olya (Persian: ندكوه عليا, also Romanized as Nad Kūh-e ‘Olyā; also known as Nad Kūh and Natkūh) is a village in Kushk Rural District, in the Central District of Bafq County, Yazd Province, Iran. At the 2006 census, its population was 22, in 6 families.
