= Faragheh =

Village in Yazd province, Iran

Faragheh Persian: فراغه
- Village
- Location within Iran
- Coordinates: 31°03′07″N 53°01′47″E
- Country: Iran
- Province: Yazd
- County: Abarkuh
- District: Central
- Rural District: Faragheh

Population (2016)
  - Total: 1,040
- Time zone: UTC+3:30 (IRST)

Faragheh (Persian: فراغه) (Note: Also romanized as Farāgheh and Ferāghah; also known as Ferāgha) is a village in, and the capital of, Faragheh Rural District of the Central District of Abarkuh County, Yazd province, Iran.

== Demographics ==
=== Population ===
At the time of the 2006 National Census, the village's population was 994 in 272 households. The following census in 2011 counted 1,059 people in 334 households. The 2016 census measured the population of the village as 1,040 people in 336 households. It was the most populous village in its rural district.
