= Razaviyeh, South Khorasan =

Razaviyeh رضويه
- Village
- Location within Iran
- Coordinates: 33°17′11″N 57°37′58″E
- Country: Iran
- Province: South Khorasan
- County: Tabas
- Bakhsh: Deyhuk
- Rural District: Deyhuk

Population (2006)
  - Total: 21
- Time zone: UTC+3:30 (IRST)
  - Summer (DST): UTC+4:30 (IRDT)

Razaviyeh (Persian: رضويه, also Romanized as Raẕavīyeh and Raẕavīeh; also known as Rīzgūn) is a village in Deyhuk Rural District, Deyhuk District, Tabas County, South Khorasan Province, Iran. At the 2006 census, its population was 21, in 4 families.
