= Lakhvajeh =

Lakhvajeh لاخواجه
- Village
- Location within Iran
- Coordinates: 31°35′54″N 53°43′18″E
- Country: Iran
- Province: Yazd
- County: Taft
- Bakhsh: Central
- Rural District: Dehshir

Population (2006)
  - Total: 40
- Time zone: UTC+3:30 (IRST)
  - Summer (DST): UTC+4:30 (IRDT)

Lakhvajeh (Persian: لاخواجه, also Romanized as Lākhvājeh) is a village in Dehshir Rural District, in the Central District of Taft County, Yazd Province, Iran. At the 2006 census, its population was 40, in 13 families.
