= Tajabad, Tabas =

Tajabad تاج اباد
- Village
- Location within Iran
- Coordinates: 33°42′35″N 56°49′22″E
- Country: Iran
- Province: South Khorasan
- County: Tabas
- Bakhsh: Central
- Rural District: Montazeriyeh

Population (2006)
  - Total: 25
- Time zone: UTC+3:30 (IRST)
  - Summer (DST): UTC+4:30 (IRDT)

Tajabad (Persian: تاج اباد, also Romanized as Tājābād; also known as Tājīābād) is a village in Montazeriyeh Rural District, in the Central District of Tabas County, South Khorasan Province, Iran. At the 2006 census, its population was 25, in 6 families.
