= Korizan =

Korizan كريزان
- Village
- Location within Iran
- Coordinates: 31°27′11″N 54°19′31″E
- Country: Iran
- Province: Yazd
- County: Mehriz
- Bakhsh: Central
- Rural District: Tang Chenar

Population (2006)
  - Total: 10
- Time zone: UTC+3:30 (IRST)
  - Summer (DST): UTC+4:30 (IRDT)

Korizan (Persian: كريزان, also Romanized as Korīzān) is a village in Tang Chenar Rural District, in the Central District of Mehriz County, Yazd province, Iran. At the 2006 census, its population was 10, in 4 families.
