= Kalbali =

Kalbali كلبعلي
- Village
- Location within Iran
- Coordinates: 31°31′56″N 54°02′37″E
- Country: Iran
- Province: Yazd
- County: Taft
- Bakhsh: Nir
- Rural District: Sakhvid

Population (2006)
  - Total: 33
- Time zone: UTC+3:30 (IRST)
  - Summer (DST): UTC+4:30 (IRDT)

Kalbali (Persian: كلبعلي, also Romanized as Kalb‘alī; also known as Kalbī and Kalvī) is a village in Sakhvid Rural District, Nir District, Taft County, Yazd Province, Iran. At the 2006 census, its population was 33, in 11 families.
