= Deh-e Tah =

Deh-e Tah ده ته
- Village
- Location within Iran
- Coordinates: 32°55′42″N 57°39′52″E
- Country: Iran
- Province: South Khorasan
- County: Tabas
- Bakhsh: Deyhuk
- Rural District: Kavir

Population (2006)
  - Total: 41
- Time zone: UTC+3:30 (IRST)
  - Summer (DST): UTC+4:30 (IRDT)

Deh-e Tah (Persian: ده ته, also Romanized as Deh Teh; also known as Dahtah, Deh Nah, and Dehtā) is a village in Kavir Rural District, Deyhuk District, Tabas County, South Khorasan Province, Iran. At the 2006 census, its population was 41, in 16 families.
