= Khareng =

Khareng خارنگ
- Village
- Location within Iran
- Coordinates: 31°48′30″N 55°52′19″E
- Country: Iran
- Province: Yazd
- County: Behabad
- Bakhsh: Central
- Rural District: Jolgeh

Population (2006)
  - Total: 14
- Time zone: UTC+3:30 (IRST)
  - Summer (DST): UTC+4:30 (IRDT)

Khareng (Persian: خارنگ, also Romanized as Khāreng and Khārang; also known as Khārnak) is a village in Jolgeh Rural District, in the Central District of Behabad County, Yazd Province, Iran.

== Population ==
At the 2006 census, its population was 14, in 5 families.
