= Dar Dehu-ye Pain =

Dar Dehu-ye Pain دردهوپائين
- Village
- Location within Iran
- Coordinates: 31°41′03″N 56°02′35″E
- Country: Iran
- Province: Yazd
- County: Behabad
- Bakhsh: Central
- Rural District: Banestan

Population (2006)
  - Total: 24
- Time zone: UTC+3:30 (IRST)
  - Summer (DST): UTC+4:30 (IRDT)

Dar Dehu-ye Pain (Persian: دردهوپائين, also Romanized as Dar Dehū-ye Pā’īn and Dar Dehū Pā’īn) is a village in Banestan Rural District, in the Central District of Behabad County, Yazd Province, Iran. At the 2006 census, its population was 24, in 11 families.
