= Bandazun =

Bandazun بندازون
- Village
- Location within Iran
- Coordinates: 31°42′36″N 53°39′41″E
- Country: Iran
- Province: Yazd
- County: Taft
- Bakhsh: Central
- Rural District: Nasrabad

Population (2006)
  - Total: 9
- Time zone: UTC+3:30 (IRST)
  - Summer (DST): UTC+4:30 (IRDT)

Bandazun (Persian: بندازون, romanized: Bandāzūn), also known as Bandāzān, is a village in Nasrabad Rural District, in the Central District of Taft County, Yazd Province, Iran. At the 2006 census, its population was 9, in 7 families.
