= Tezenj =

Tezenj طزنج
- Village
- Location within Iran
- Coordinates: 31°38′30″N 54°14′33″E
- Country: Iran
- Province: Yazd
- County: Mehriz
- Bakhsh: Central
- Rural District: Miankuh

Population (2006)
  - Total: 246
- Time zone: UTC+3:30 (IRST)
  - Summer (DST): UTC+4:30 (IRDT)

Tezenj (Persian: طزنج, also Romanized as Ţezenj) is a village in Miankuh Rural District, in the Central District of Mehriz County, Yazd Province, Iran to the south east of the village about 50 km lies the tower of silence. In the 2006 census, its population was 246, in 82 families consisting mostly of Shi’a Muslims.
