= Darb-e Raz =

Darb-e Raz درب رز
- Village
- Location within Iran
- Coordinates: 31°49′55″N 53°59′06″E
- Country: Iran
- Province: Yazd
- County: Saduq
- Bakhsh: Khezrabad
- Rural District: Kezab

Population (2006)
  - Total: 86
- Time zone: UTC+3:30 (IRST)
  - Summer (DST): UTC+4:30 (IRDT)

Darb-e Raz (Persian: درب رز, also Romanized as Darb Raz; also known as Darb-e Zar, Dar-e Borz, and Dar-e Raz) is a village in Kezab Rural District, Khezrabad District, Saduq County, Yazd Province, Iran. As of the 2006 census its population was 86, spread across 27 families.
