= Alanguiyeh =

Alanguiyeh النگوييه
- Village
- Location within Iran
- Coordinates: 31°40′08″N 56°05′47″E
- Country: Iran
- Province: Yazd
- County: Behabad
- Bakhsh: Central
- Rural District: Banestan

Population (2006)
  - Total: 15
- Time zone: UTC+3:30 (IRST)
  - Summer (DST): UTC+4:30 (IRDT)

Alanguiyeh (Persian: النگوييه, also Romanized as Alangū’īyeh and Olangūyeh) is a village in Banestan Rural District, in the Central District of Behabad County, Yazd Province, Iran. At the 2006 census, its population was 15, in 5 families.
