= Rahimabad, Behabad =

Rahimabad رحيم آباد
- Village
- Location within Iran
- Coordinates: 32°00′29″N 55°56′54″E
- Country: Iran
- Province: Yazd
- County: Behabad
- Bakhsh: Central
- Rural District: Jolgeh

Population (2006)
  - Total: 106
- Time zone: UTC+3:30 (IRST)
  - Summer (DST): UTC+4:30 (IRDT)

Rahimabad (Persian: رحيم آباد, also Romanized as Raḩīmābād; also known as Rahim Abad Bahabad) is a village in Jolgeh Rural District, in the Central District of Behabad County, Yazd Province, Iran. At the 2006 census, its population was 106, in 23 families.
