= Chah Matak =

Chah Matk چاه متك
- village
- Location within Iran
- Coordinates: 32°24′33″N 54°30′11″E
- Country: Iran
- Province: Yazd
- County: Ardakan
- Bakhsh: Kharanaq
- Rural District: Rabatat

Population (2006)
  - Total: 75
- Time zone: UTC+3:30 (IRST)
  - Summer (DST): UTC+4:30 (IRDT)

Chah Matk (Persian: چاه متك, also Romanized as Chāh Matk ) is a village in Rabatat Rurakl District, Kharanaq District, Ardakan County, Yazd Province, Iran. At the 2006 census, its population was 75, in 26 families.
