= Khowrah-e Sofla =

Khowrah-e Sofla خوره سفلي
- Village
- Location within Iran
- Coordinates: 31°33′00″N 53°51′00″E
- Country: Iran
- Province: Yazd
- County: Taft
- Bakhsh: Central
- Rural District: Dehshir

Population (2006)
  - Total: 46
- Time zone: UTC+3:30 (IRST)
  - Summer (DST): UTC+4:30 (IRDT)

Khowrah-e Sofla (Persian: خوره سفلي, also Romanized as Khowrah-e Soflá; also known as Khāūra, Khooreh Olya, Khooreh Sofla, and Khowrah) is a village in Dehshir Rural District, in the Central District of Taft County, Yazd Province, Iran. At the 2006 census, its population was 46, in 17 families.
