= Marzanak =

Marzanak مرزانك
- Village
- Location within Iran
- Coordinates: 31°49′04″N 53°59′13″E
- Country: Iran
- Province: Yazd
- County: Saduq
- Bakhsh: Khezrabad
- Rural District: Kezab

Population (2006)
  - Total: 81
- Time zone: UTC+3:30 (IRST)
  - Summer (DST): UTC+4:30 (IRDT)

Marzanak (Persian: مرزانك, also Romanized as Marzānak; also known as Marūnok, Marzoonak, and Marzūnak) is a village in Kezab Rural District, Khezrabad District, Saduq County, Yazd Province, Iran. At the 2006 census, its population was 81, in 27 families.
