= Tituzeynal =

Tituzeynal تيتوزينل
- Village
- Location within Iran
- Coordinates: 31°36′52″N 56°11′23″E
- Country: Iran
- Province: Yazd
- County: Behabad
- Bakhsh: Asfyj
- Rural District: Asfyj

Population (2006)
  - Total: 25
- Time zone: UTC+3:30 (IRST)
  - Summer (DST): UTC+4:30 (IRDT)

Tituzeynal (Persian: تيتوزينل, also Romanized as Tītūzeynal) is a village in Asfyj Rural District, Asfyj District, Behabad County, Yazd Province, Iran. At the 2006 census, its population was 25, in 5 families.
