= Hamsok =

Hamsok همسك
- Village
- Location within Iran
- Coordinates: 31°43′35″N 55°56′09″E
- Country: Iran
- Province: Yazd
- County: Bafq
- Bakhsh: Central
- Rural District: Kushk

Population (2006)
  - Total: 12
- Time zone: UTC+3:30 (IRST)
  - Summer (DST): UTC+4:30 (IRDT)

Hamsok (Persian: همسك; also known as Ham Sowk and Hamsūk) is a village in Kushk Rural District, in the Central District of Bafq County, Yazd Province, Iran. At the 2006 census, its population was 12, in 5 families.
