= Ranjeqan =

Ranjeqan رنجقان
- Village
- Location within Iran
- Coordinates: 32°25′48″N 54°25′12″E
- Country: Iran
- Province: Yazd
- County: Ardakan
- Bakhsh: Kharanaq
- Rural District: Zarrin

Population (2006)
  - Total: 18
- Time zone: UTC+3:30 (IRST)
  - Summer (DST): UTC+4:30 (IRDT)

Ranjeqan (Persian: رنجقان, also Romanized as Ranjeqān) is a village in Zarrin Rural District, Kharanaq District, Ardakan County, Yazd Province, Iran. At the 2006 census, its population was 18, in 7 families.
