= Maduiyeh =

Maduiyeh مدوئيه
- Village
- Location within Iran
- Coordinates: 31°06′22″N 53°17′38″E
- Country: Iran
- Province: Yazd
- County: Abarkuh
- Bakhsh: Central
- Rural District: Tirjerd

Population (2006)
  - Total: 138
- Time zone: UTC+3:30 (IRST)
  - Summer (DST): UTC+4:30 (IRDT)

Maduiyeh (Persian: مدوئيه, also Romanized as Madū’īyeh) is a village in Tirjerd Rural District, in the Central District of Abarkuh County, Yazd Province, Iran. At the 2006 census, its population was 138, in 39 families.
