= Khavas Kuh =

Khavas Kuh خواص كوه
- Village
- Location within Iran
- Coordinates: 32°18′22″N 53°40′28″E
- Country: Iran
- Province: Yazd
- County: Ardakan
- Bakhsh: Aqda
- Rural District: Aqda

Population (2006)
  - Total: 21
- Time zone: UTC+3:30 (IRST)
  - Summer (DST): UTC+4:30 (IRDT)

Khavas Kuh (Persian: خواص كوه, also Romanized as Khavāş Kūh; also known as Khāş Kūh and Khas Kūhī) is a village in Aqda Rural District, Aqda District, Ardakan County, Yazd Province, Iran. At the 2006 census, its population was 21, in 9 families.
