= Samsamabad =

Samsamabad صمصام اباد
- Village
- Location within Iran
- Coordinates: 31°44′12″N 53°53′57″E
- Country: Iran
- Province: Yazd
- County: Taft
- Bakhsh: Central
- Rural District: Nasrabad

Population (2006)
  - Total: 38
- Time zone: UTC+3:30 (IRST)
  - Summer (DST): UTC+4:30 (IRDT)

Samsamabad (Persian: صمصام اباد, romanized: Şamşāmābād and Şamşamābād) is a village in Nasrabad Rural District, in the Central District of Taft County, Yazd Province, Iran. At the 2006 census, its population was 38, in 16 families.
