= Kafiabad, Yazd =

Kafiabad كافي اباد
- Village
- Location within Iran
- Coordinates: 31°52′10″N 53°52′48″E
- Country: Iran
- Province: Yazd
- County: Saduq
- Bakhsh: Khezrabad
- Rural District: Kezab

Population (2006)
  - Total: 218
- Time zone: UTC+3:30 (IRST)
  - Summer (DST): UTC+4:30 (IRDT)

Kafiabad (Persian: كافي اباد, also Romanized as Kāfīābād and Kafīābād) is a village in Kezab Rural District, Khezrabad District, Saduq County, Yazd Province, Iran. At the 2006 census, its population was 218, in 56 families.
