= Mohammadiyeh, Yazd =

Mohammadiyeh محمديه
- Village
- Interactive map of Mohammadiyeh
- Country: Iran
- Province: Yazd
- County: Yazd
- Bakhsh: Central
- Rural District: Fahraj

Population (2006)
  - Total: 253
- Time zone: UTC+3:30 (IRST)
  - Summer (DST): UTC+4:30 (IRDT)

Mohammadiyeh (Persian: محمديه, also Romanized as Moḩammadīyeh) is a village in Fahraj Rural District, in the Central District of Yazd County, Yazd Province, Iran. At the 2006 census, its population was 253, in 50 families.
