= Bagh-e Mehdi =

Bagh-e Mehdi باغ مهدي
- Village
- Location within Iran
- Coordinates: 31°36′11″N 53°59′51″E
- Country: Iran
- Province: Yazd
- County: Taft
- Bakhsh: Central
- Rural District: Pishkuh

Population (2006)
  - Total: 127
- Time zone: UTC+3:30 (IRST)
  - Summer (DST): UTC+4:30 (IRDT)

Bagh-e Mehdi (Persian: باغ مهدي, also Romanized as Bāgh-e Mehdī) is a village in Pishkuh Rural District, in the Central District of Taft County, Yazd Province, Iran. At the 2006 census, its population was 127, in 47 families.
