= Espidar =

Espidar اسپيدر
- Village
- Location within Iran
- Coordinates: 31°36′48″N 53°59′59″E
- Country: Iran
- Province: Yazd
- County: Taft
- Bakhsh: Central
- Rural District: Pishkuh

Population (2006)
  - Total: 8
- Time zone: UTC+3:30 (IRST)
  - Summer (DST): UTC+4:30 (IRDT)

Espidar (Persian: اسپيدر, also Romanized as Espīdār; also known as Espīdārak and Espīdārok) is a village in Pishkuh Rural District, in the Central District of Taft County, Yazd Province, Iran. At the 2006 census, its population was 8, in 5 families.
