= Dashti-ye Khan =

Dashti-ye Khan دشتي خان
- Village
- Location within Iran
- Coordinates: 31°37′24″N 56°06′17″E
- Country: Iran
- Province: Yazd
- County: Bafq
- Bakhsh: Central
- Rural District: Sabzdasht

Population (2006)
  - Total: 16
- Time zone: UTC+3:30 (IRST)
  - Summer (DST): UTC+4:30 (IRDT)

Dashti-ye Khan (Persian: دشتي خان, also romanized as Dashtī-ye Khān; also known as Dasht-e Khan) is a village in Sabzdasht Rural District, in the Central District of Bafq County, Yazd Province, Iran. At the 2006 census, its population was 16, in 6 families.
