= Kavijan =

Kavijan كويجان
- Village
- Location within Iran
- Coordinates: 31°48′34″N 56°03′29″E
- Country: Iran
- Province: Yazd
- County: Behabad
- Bakhsh: Central
- Rural District: Banestan

Population (2006)
  - Total: 210
- Time zone: UTC+3:30 (IRST)
  - Summer (DST): UTC+4:30 (IRDT)

Kavijan (Persian: كويجان, also Romanized as Kavījān and Kevījān; also known as Kabīgūn) is a village in Banestan Rural District, in the Central District of Behabad County, Yazd Province, Iran. At the 2006 census, its population was 210, in 65 families.
