= Mokhallesun =

Mokhalasun مخلصون
- Village
- Location within Iran
- Coordinates: 31°29′59″N 54°29′58″E
- Country: Iran
- Province: Yazd
- County: Mehriz
- Bakhsh: Central
- Rural District: Khvormiz

Population (2006)
  - Total: 23
- Time zone: UTC+3:30 (IRST)
  - Summer (DST): UTC+4:30 (IRDT)

Mokhalasun (Persian: مخلصون, also Romanized as Mokhalleşūn, Mokhlesoon, and Mokhleşūn; also known as Mokhannetūn, Mokhannetūn, Mokhannetūn, and Mukhalisun) is a village in Khvormiz Rural District, in the Central District of Mehriz County, Yazd Province, Iran. At the 2006 census, its population was 23, in 10 families.
