= Talebabad, Yazd =

Talebabad طالب اباد
- Village
- Location within Iran
- Coordinates: 30°06′21″N 54°24′58″E
- Country: Iran
- Province: Yazd
- County: Khatam
- Bakhsh: Central
- Rural District: Fathabad

Population (2006)
  - Total: 51
- Time zone: UTC+3:30 (IRST)
  - Summer (DST): UTC+4:30 (IRDT)

Talebabad (Persian: طالب اباد, also Romanized as Ţālebābād) is a village in Fathabad Rural District, in the Central District of Khatam County, Yazd Province, Iran. At the 2006 census, its population was 51, in 9 families.
