= Jan Barazan =

Jan Barazan جان برازان
- Village
- Location within Iran
- Coordinates: 31°35′10″N 54°07′07″E
- Country: Iran
- Province: Yazd
- County: Taft
- Bakhsh: Central
- Rural District: Shirkuh

Population (2006)
  - Total: 290
- Time zone: UTC+3:30 (IRST)
  - Summer (DST): UTC+4:30 (IRDT)

Jan Barazan (Persian: جان برازان, also Romanized as Jān Barāzān; also known as Jombarzan, Jumbarazun, and Maḩalleh-ye Jān Bārāzūn) is a village in Shirkuh Rural District, in the Central District of Taft County, Yazd Province, Iran. At the 2006 census, its population was 290, in 84 families.
