= Bagh Dehuk =

Bagh Dehuk باغ دهوك
- Village
- Location within Iran
- Coordinates: 31°33′48″N 54°28′04″E
- Country: Iran
- Province: Yazd
- County: Mehriz
- Bakhsh: Central
- Rural District: Khvormiz

Population (2006)
  - Total: 141
- Time zone: UTC+3:30 (IRST)
  - Summer (DST): UTC+4:30 (IRDT)

Bagh Dehuk (Persian: باغ دهوك, also Romanized as Bāgh Dehūk and Bāgh-e Dehūk; also known as Bāgh-e Dohok) is a village in Khvormiz Rural District, in the Central District of Mehriz County, Yazd Province, Iran. At the 2006 census, its population was 141, in 44 families.
