= Mohammadabad-e Alizadeh =

Mohammadabad-e Alizadeh محمدابادعليزاده
- Village
- Country: Iran
- Province: Yazd
- County: Mehriz
- Bakhsh: Central
- Rural District: Bahadoran

Population (2006)
  - Total: 16
- Time zone: UTC+3:30 (IRST)
  - Summer (DST): UTC+4:30 (IRDT)

Mohammadabad-e Alizadeh (Persian: محمدابادعليزاده, also Romanized as Moḩammadābād-e ‘Alīzādeh) is a village in Bahadoran Rural District, in the Central District of Mehriz County, Yazd Province, Iran. At the 2006 census, its population was 16, in 4 families.
