= Zeynabad, Khatam =

Zeynabad زين اباد
- Village
- Location within Iran
- Coordinates: 30°05′08″N 54°19′31″E
- Country: Iran
- Province: Yazd
- County: Khatam
- Bakhsh: Central
- Rural District: Fathabad

Population (2006)
  - Total: 43
- Time zone: UTC+3:30 (IRST)
  - Summer (DST): UTC+4:30 (IRDT)

Zeynabad (Persian: زين اباد, also Romanized as Zeynābād and Zīnābād) is a village in Fathabad Rural District, in the Central District of Khatam County, Yazd Province, Iran. At the 2006 census, its population was 43, in 10 families.
