= Gorginabad, Behabad =

Gorginabad گرگين اباد
- Village
- Location within Iran
- Coordinates: 31°58′14″N 55°57′38″E
- Country: Iran
- Province: Yazd
- County: Behabad
- Bakhsh: Central
- Rural District: Jolgeh

Population (2006)
  - Total: 368
- Time zone: UTC+3:30 (IRST)
  - Summer (DST): UTC+4:30 (IRDT)

Gorginabad (Persian: گرگين اباد, also Romanized as Gorgīnābād) is a village in Jolgeh Rural District, in the Central District of Behabad County, Yazd Province, Iran. At the 2006 census, its population was 368, in 98 families.
