= Mil Sefid =

Mil Sefid ميل سفيد
- Village
- Location within Iran
- Coordinates: 31°57′15″N 53°44′30″E
- Country: Iran
- Province: Yazd
- County: Saduq
- Bakhsh: Khezrabad
- Rural District: Kezab

Population (2006)
  - Total: 95
- Time zone: UTC+3:30 (IRST)
  - Summer (DST): UTC+4:30 (IRDT)

Mil Sefid (Persian: ميل سفيد, also Romanized as Mīl Sefīd and Mīl-e Sefīd; also known as Mazra‘eh Mīl-e Sefīd) is a village in Kezab Rural District, Khezrabad District, Saduq County, Yazd Province, Iran. At the 2006 census, its population was 95, in 26 families.
