= Aderu =

Aderu ادرو
- Village
- Location within Iran
- Coordinates: 31°23′45″N 54°19′29″E
- Country: Iran
- Province: Yazd
- County: Mehriz
- Bakhsh: Central
- Rural District: Tang Chenar

Population (2006)
  - Total: 78
- Time zone: UTC+3:30 (IRST)
  - Summer (DST): UTC+4:30 (IRDT)

Aderu (Persian: ادرو, also Romanized as Āderū and Aderū; also known as Ādehrū) is a village in Tang Chenar Rural District, in the Central District of Mehriz County, Yazd Province, Iran. At the 2006 census, its population was 78, in 19 families.
