= Turan Posht =

Turan Posht توران پشت
- Village
- Location within Iran
- Coordinates: 31°31′27″N 53°51′53″E
- Country: Iran
- Province: Yazd
- County: Taft
- Bakhsh: Central
- Rural District: Dehshir

Population (2006)
  - Total: 125
- Time zone: UTC+3:30 (IRST)
  - Summer (DST): UTC+4:30 (IRDT)

Turan Posht (Persian: توران پشت, also Romanized as Tūrān Posht; also known as Tarūm Pusht) is a village in Dehshir Rural District, in the Central District of Taft County, Yazd Province, Iran. At the 2006 census, its population was 125, in 58 families.
