= Gazumeh =

Gazumeh گزومه
- Village
- Location within Iran
- Coordinates: 31°29′53″N 54°00′41″E
- Country: Iran
- Province: Yazd
- County: Taft
- Bakhsh: Nir
- Rural District: Banadkuk

Population (2006)
  - Total: 20
- Time zone: UTC+3:30 (IRST)
  - Summer (DST): UTC+4:30 (IRDT)

Gazumeh (Persian: گزومه, romanized: Gazūmeh) is a village in Banadkuk Rural District, Nir District, Taft County, Yazd Province, Iran. At the 2006 census, its population was 20, in 10 families.
