= Patgigan =

Patgigan پتگيگان
- Village
- Location within Iran
- Coordinates: 31°39′56″N 56°06′02″E
- Country: Iran
- Province: Yazd
- County: Behabad
- Bakhsh: Central
- Rural District: Banestan

Population (2006)
  - Total: 31
- Time zone: UTC+3:30 (IRST)
  - Summer (DST): UTC+4:30 (IRDT)

Patgigan (Persian: پتگيگان, also Romanized as Patgīgān; also known as Patkīgān) is a village in Banestan Rural District, in the Central District of Behabad County, Yazd Province, Iran. At the 2006 census, its population was 31, in 5 families.
