= Qanatu =

Qanatu قناتو
- Village
- Location within Iran
- Coordinates: 29°45′27″N 54°10′53″E
- Country: Iran
- Province: Yazd
- County: Khatam
- Bakhsh: Central
- Rural District: Chahak

Population (2006)
  - Total: 54
- Time zone: UTC+3:30 (IRST)
  - Summer (DST): UTC+4:30 (IRDT)

Qanatu (Persian: قناتو, also Romanized as Qanātū) is a village in Chahak Rural District, in the Central District of Khatam County, Yazd Province, Iran. At the 2006 census, its population was 54, in 13 families.
