= Qaleh-ye Khorgushi =

Qaleh-ye Khorgushi قلعه خرگوشي
- Village
- Country: Iran
- Province: Yazd
- County: Ardakan
- Bakhsh: Aqda
- Rural District: Narestan

Population (2006)
  - Total: 91
- Time zone: UTC+3:30 (IRST)
  - Summer (DST): UTC+4:30 (IRDT)

Qaleh-ye Khorgushi (Persian: قلعه خرگوشي, also Romanized as Qal‘eh-ye Khorgūshī) is a village in Narestan Rural District, Aqda District, Ardakan County, Yazd Province, Iran. At the 2006 census, its population was 91, in 6 families.
