= Zarkuiyeh, Yazd =

Zarkuiyeh زاركوييه
- Village
- Location within Iran
- Coordinates: 31°48′02″N 55°50′03″E
- Country: Iran
- Province: Yazd
- County: Behabad
- Bakhsh: Central
- Rural District: Jolgeh

Population (2006)
  - Total: 175
- Time zone: UTC+3:30 (IRST)
  - Summer (DST): UTC+4:30 (IRDT)

Zarkuiyeh (Persian: زاركوييه, also Romanized as Zārkū’īyeh; also known as Deh-e Zār Kūh) is a village in Jolgeh Rural District, in the Central District of Behabad County, Yazd Province, Iran. At the 2006 census, its population was 175, in 48 families.
