= Nafisabad =

Nafisabad نفيس اباد
- Village
- Location within Iran
- Coordinates: 32°26′04″N 54°42′21″E
- Country: Iran
- Province: Yazd
- County: Ardakan
- Bakhsh: Kharanaq
- Rural District: Rabatat

Population (2006)
  - Total: 22
- Time zone: UTC+3:30 (IRST)
  - Summer (DST): UTC+4:30 (IRDT)

Nafisabad (Persian: نفيس اباد, also Romanized as Nafīsābād) is a village in Rabatat Rural District, Kharanaq District, Ardakan County, Yazd Province, Iran. At the 2006 census, its population was 22, in 6 families.
