= Shorb ol Ayn =

Shorb ol Ayn شرب العين
- Village
- Location within Iran
- Coordinates: 31°48′42″N 54°01′30″E
- Country: Iran
- Province: Yazd
- County: Saduq
- Bakhsh: Khezrabad
- Rural District: Kezab

Population (2006)
  - Total: 115
- Time zone: UTC+3:30 (IRST)
  - Summer (DST): UTC+4:30 (IRDT)

Shorb ol Ayn (Persian: شرب العين, also Romanized as Shorb ol ‘Ayn and Shorb ol ‘Eyn) is a village in Kezab Rural District, Khezrabad District, Saduq County, Yazd Province, Iran. At the 2006 census, its population was 115, in 48 families.
