= Hoseynabad-e Pashmi =

Hoseynabad-e Pashmi حسين ابادپشمي
- Village
- Location within Iran
- Coordinates: 31°16′48″N 54°00′36″E
- Country: Iran
- Province: Yazd
- County: Taft
- Bakhsh: Nir
- Rural District: Garizat

Population (2006)
  - Total: 15
- Time zone: UTC+3:30 (IRST)
  - Summer (DST): UTC+4:30 (IRDT)

Hoseynabad-e Pashmi (Persian: حسين ابادپشمي, also Romanized as Ḩoseynābād-e Pashmī; also known as Ḩoseynābād) is a village in Garizat Rural District, Nir District, Taft County, Yazd Province, Iran. At the 2006 census, its population was 15, in 4 families.
