= Bamakan =

Bamakan بامكان
- Village
- Location within Iran
- Coordinates: 31°52′19″N 53°52′56″E
- Country: Iran
- Province: Yazd
- County: Saduq
- Bakhsh: Khezrabad
- Rural District: Kezab

Population (2006)
  - Total: 130
- Time zone: UTC+3:30 (IRST)
  - Summer (DST): UTC+4:30 (IRDT)

Bamakan (Persian: بامكان, also Romanized as Bāmakān, Bāmekān, and Bāmkān) is a village in Kezab Rural District, Khezrabad District, Saduq County, Yazd Province, Iran. At the 2006 census, its population was 130, in 44 families.
