= Robat-e Khan =

Robat-e Khan رباطخان
- Village
- Location within Iran
- Coordinates: 33°22′01″N 56°04′13″E
- Country: Iran
- Province: South Khorasan
- County: Tabas
- Bakhsh: Central
- Rural District: Montazeriyeh

Population (2006)
  - Total: 80
- Time zone: UTC+3:30 (IRST)
  - Summer (DST): UTC+4:30 (IRDT)

Robat-e Khan (Persian: رباطخان, also Romanized as Robāţ-e Khān and Robāt Khān; also known as Ribāt-i-Khān) is a village in Montazeriyeh Rural District, in the Central District of Tabas County, South Khorasan Province, Iran. At the 2006 census, its population was 80, in 27 families.
