= Qasemabad, Khatam =

Qasemabad قاسم اباد
- Village
- Location within Iran
- Coordinates: 30°28′48″N 54°15′22″E
- Country: Iran
- Province: Yazd
- County: Khatam
- Bakhsh: Marvast
- Rural District: Harabarjan

Population (2006)
  - Total: 207
- Time zone: UTC+3:30 (IRST)
  - Summer (DST): UTC+4:30 (IRDT)

Qasemabad (Persian: قاسم اباد, also Romanized as Qāsemābād) is a village in Harabarjan Rural District, Marvast District, Khatam County, Yazd Province, Iran. At the 2006 census, its population was 207, in 34 families.
