= Kamkuiyeh =

Kamkuiyeh كمكوئيه
- Village
- Location within Iran
- Coordinates: 31°40′18″N 56°09′14″E
- Country: Iran
- Province: Yazd
- County: Behabad
- Bakhsh: Asfyj
- Rural District: Asfyj

Population (2006)
  - Total: 190
- Time zone: UTC+3:30 (IRST)
  - Summer (DST): UTC+4:30 (IRDT)

Kamkuiyeh (Persian: كمكوئيه, also Romanized as Kamkū’īyeh; also known as Kamgu’iyeh and Kemkūh) is a village in Asfyj Rural District, Asfyj District, Behabad County, Yazd Province, Iran. At the 2006 census, its population was 190, in 50 families.
