= Sefid Kuh, Yazd =

Sefid Kuh سفيدكوه
- Village
- Location within Iran
- Coordinates: 32°24′03″N 53°33′00″E
- Country: Iran
- Province: Yazd
- County: Ardakan
- Bakhsh: Aqda
- Rural District: Narestan

Population (2006)
  - Total: 26
- Time zone: UTC+3:30 (IRST)
  - Summer (DST): UTC+4:30 (IRDT)

Sefid Kuh (Persian: سفيدكوه, also Romanized as Sefīd Kūh) is a village in Narestan Rural District, Aqda District, Ardakan County, Yazd Province, Iran. At the 2006 census, its population was 26, in eight families.
