= Darb-e Hanz =

Darb-e Hanz درب هنز
- Village
- Location within Iran
- Coordinates: 31°56′01″N 55°58′23″E
- Country: Iran
- Province: Yazd
- County: Behabad
- Bakhsh: Central
- Rural District: Jolgeh

Population (2006)
  - Total: 100
- Time zone: UTC+3:30 (IRST)
  - Summer (DST): UTC+4:30 (IRDT)

Darb-e Hanz (Persian: درب هنز; also known as Darb-e Ḩamz and Dar Ḩamz) is a village in Jolgeh Rural District, in the Central District of Behabad County, Yazd Province, Iran. At the 2006 census, its population was 100, in 23 families.
