= Gol Kan, South Khorasan =

Gol Kan گل كن
- Village
- Location within Iran
- Coordinates: 33°00′52″N 57°40′55″E
- Country: Iran
- Province: South Khorasan
- County: Tabas
- Bakhsh: Deyhuk
- Rural District: Kavir

Population (2006)
  - Total: 15
- Time zone: UTC+3:30 (IRST)
  - Summer (DST): UTC+4:30 (IRDT)

Gol Kan (Persian: گل كن; also known as Gol Kaq) is a village in Kavir Rural District, Deyhuk District, Tabas County, South Khorasan Province, Iran. At the 2006 census, its population was 15, in 5 families.
