= Madvar, Yazd =

Madvar مدوار
- village
- Location within Iran
- Coordinates: 31°31′14″N 54°24′35″E
- Country: Iran
- Province: Yazd
- County: Mehriz
- Bakhsh: Central
- Rural District: Khvormiz

Population (2016)
  - Total: 1,246
- Time zone: UTC+3:30 (IRST)
  - Summer (DST): UTC+4:30 (IRDT)
- Website: http://madvar.ir/en/

Madvar (Persian: مدوار, also Romanized as Madvār) is a village in Khvormiz Rural District, in the Central District of Mehriz County, Yazd Province, Iran. At the 2006 census, its population was 986, in 263 families.

Madvar or Mazvar is located near a permanent spring called Gharbalbiz. This village has been the home of many people from the pre-Islamic times. Various ceramic artifacts that were found near this village especially in the ancient hill called Shah Neshin represent the ancient civilization in this area.

== Attraction ==
Gharbalbiz Spring

The spring “Gharbalbiz” which is the most important source of water in Mehriz and Yazd is located in northwest of Madvar. This spring had so much water in the past that it was transported to Yazd through covered channels.
