= Mobarakeh Rural District (Bafq County) =

Rural district in Yazd province, Iran

Mobarakeh Rural District Persian: دهستان مباركه
- Rural District
- Location within Iran
- Coordinates: 31°39′01″N 55°19′41″E
- Country: Iran
- Province: Yazd
- County: Bafq
- District: Central
- Capital: Mobarakeh

Population (2016)
  - Total: 3,602
- Time zone: UTC+3:30 (IRST)

Mobarakeh Rural District (Persian: دهستان مباركه) is in the Central District of Bafq County, Yazd province, Iran. Its capital is the village of Mobarakeh.

== Demographics ==
=== Population ===
At the time of the 2006 National Census, the rural district's population was 3,869 in 1,075 households. There were 4,258 inhabitants in 1,174 households at the following census of 2011. The 2016 census measured the population of the rural district as 3,602 in 1,045 households. The most populous of its 118 villages was Mobarakeh, with 3,301 people.
