= Faragheh Rural District =

Rural district in Yazd province, Iran

Faragheh Rural District Persian: دهستان فراغه
- Rural District
- Location within Iran
- Coordinates: 31°07′41″N 53°01′22″E
- Country: Iran
- Province: Yazd
- County: Abarkuh
- District: Central
- Capital: Faragheh

Population (2016)
  - Total: 3,456
- Time zone: UTC+3:30 (IRST)

Faragheh Rural District (Persian: دهستان فراغه) is in the Central District of Abarkuh County, Yazd province, Iran. Its capital is the village of Faragheh.

== Demographics ==
=== Population ===
At the time of the 2006 National Census, the rural district's population was 3,102 in 884 households. There were 3,439 inhabitants in 1,072 households at the following census of 2011. The 2016 census measured the population of the rural district as 3,456 in 1,124 households. The most populous of its 103 villages was Faragheh, with 1,040 people.
