= Zardeyn Rural District =

Rural district in Yazd province, Iran

Zardeyn Rural District Persian: دهستان زردين
- Rural District
- Location within Iran
- Coordinates: 31°26′15″N 54°12′23″E
- Country: Iran
- Province: Yazd
- County: Taft
- District: Nir
- Capital: Zardeyn

Population (2016)
  - Total: 1,965
- Time zone: UTC+3:30 (IRST)

Zardeyn Rural District (Persian: دهستان زردين) (Note: Formerly Poshtkuh Rural District (دهستان پشتكوه)) is in Nir District of Taft County, Yazd province, Iran. Its capital is the village of Zardeyn.

== Demographics ==
=== Population ===
At the time of the 2006 National Census, the rural district's population was 2,516 in 805 households. There were 1,911 inhabitants in 705 households at the following census of 2011. The 2016 census measured the population of the rural district as 1,965 in 788 households. The most populous of its 55 villages was Zardeyn, with 556 people.

== Flood of 2022 ==
The flood of 22 July 2022 caused a lot of damage in this rural district, including the destruction of more than 50 houses and 15 cars, as well as damage to aqueducts, agricultural plots, and roads in the area.
