= Darreh =

Darreh or Dorreh or Dareh or Derreh (Persian: دره) may refer to:

- Dareh, Fars
- Darreh, Isfahan
- Darreh, Kerman
- Darreh, Kurdistan
- Darreh, Markazi
- Darreh, alternate name of Darreh Garm, Markazi
- Darreh, South Khorasan
- Darreh, Yazd
- Darreh, alternate name of Manshad, Yazd Province
