= Badamak =

Badamak (Persian: بادامك or بادمك) may refer to:

== Bādamak (بادمك) ==
- Badamak, Fars

== Bādāmak (بادامك) ==
- Badamak, Hamadan
- Badamak, Kerman
- Badamak, Lorestan
- Badamak, Qazvin
- Badamak, South Khorasan
- Badamak, Tehran
- Badamak, Yazd
