= Abdollahabad, Yazd =

Abdollahabad عبداله اباد
- Village
- Location within Iran
- Coordinates: 31°17′34″N 54°19′10″E
- Country: Iran
- Province: Yazd
- County: Mehriz
- Bakhsh: Central
- Rural District: Ernan

Population (2006)
  - Total: 99
- Time zone: UTC+3:30 (IRST)
  - Summer (DST): UTC+4:30 (IRDT)

Abdollahabad (Persian: عبداله اباد, also Romanized as ‘Abdollāhābād) is a village in Ernan Rural District, in the Central District of Mehriz County, Yazd Province, Iran. At the 2006 census, its population was 99, in 40 families.
