= Sar Yazd =

Saryazd سريزد
- Village
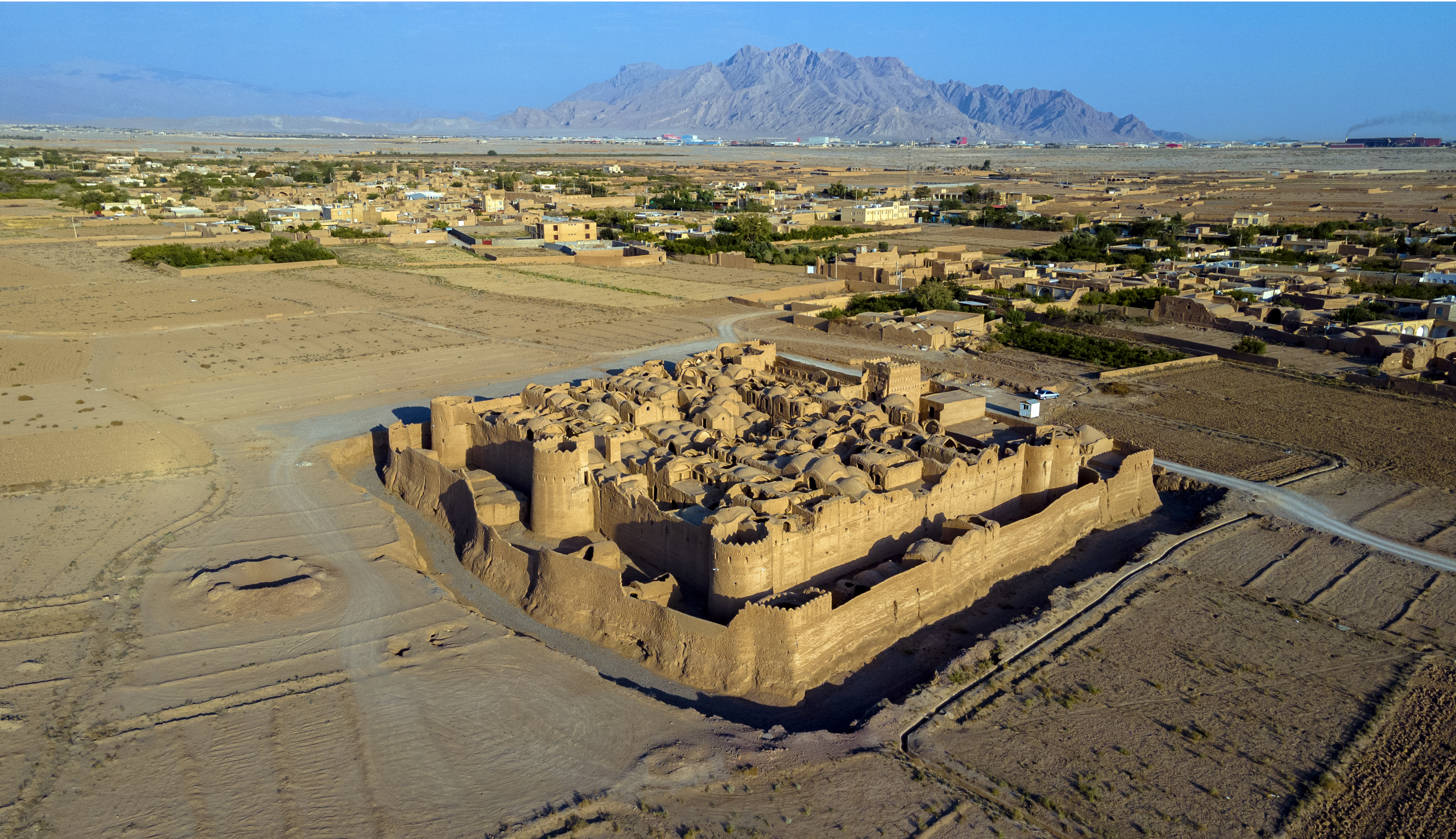
- Sar Yazd Fortress and Sar Yazd village

- Location within Iran
- Coordinates: 31°36′10″N 54°31′31″E
- Country: Iran
- Province: Yazd
- County: Mehriz
- Bakhsh: Central
- Rural District: Khvormiz

Population (2006)
  - Total: 421
- Time zone: UTC+3:30 (IRST)
  - Summer (DST): UTC+4:30 (IRDT)

Saryazd (Persian: سريزد, also romanized as Sar-e Yazd and Sar-i-Yezd is a village in Khvormiz Rural District, Mehriz County, Yazd Province, Iran. It is located 5 km east of Mehriz and 35 km south from Yazd. At the 2006 census its population was 421, in 141 families. The village's name means 'head of Yazd' in Persian.

== Notable sites ==
- Sar Yazd Fortress
