= Khvormiz =

Khvormiz or Khurmiz or Khoormiz (Persian: خورميز), also rendered as Khormiz or Kharmiz may refer to:

- Khvormiz-e Olya
- Khvormiz-e Sofla
- Khvormiz Rural District
