= Bahadoran =

Bahadoran or Bahaderan (Persian: بهادران) may refer to:

- Bagh-e Bahadoran, a city in Iran
- Bahadoran, Fars, village in Iran
- Bahadoran, Yazd, village in Iran
- Bahadoran Rural District, in Yazd Province, Iran
- Misagh Bahadoran (b. 1987), Filipino footballer
