= Fathabad, Mehriz =

Fathabad فتح اباد
- Village
- Location within Iran
- Coordinates: 31°17′33″N 54°20′25″E
- Country: Iran
- Province: Yazd
- County: Mehriz
- Bakhsh: Central
- Rural District: Ernan

Population (2006)
  - Total: 64
- Time zone: UTC+3:30 (IRST)
  - Summer (DST): UTC+4:30 (IRDT)

Fathabad (Persian: فتح اباد, also Romanized as Fatḩābād; also known as Chāh Gaz, Chehel Gaz, Chehil Gazi, and Fatḩābād-e Chehel Gazī) is a village in Ernan Rural District, in the Central District of Mehriz County, Yazd Province, Iran. At the 2006 census, its population was 64, in 23 families.
