= Ahmadabad, Mehriz =

Ahmadabad احمداباد
- Village
- Location within Iran
- Coordinates: 31°17′52″N 54°13′33″E
- Country: Iran
- Province: Yazd
- County: Mehriz
- Bakhsh: Central
- Rural District: Ernan

Population (2006)
  - Total: 147
- Time zone: UTC+3:30 (IRST)
  - Summer (DST): UTC+4:30 (IRDT)

Ahmadabad (Persian: احمداباد, also Romanized as Aḩmadābād; also known as Allāhābād) is a village in Ernan Rural District, in the Central District of Mehriz County, Yazd Province, Iran. At the 2006 census, its population was 147, in 44 families.
