= Kerdabad, Mehriz =

Kerdabad كرداباد
- Village
- Location within Iran
- Coordinates: 31°17′37″N 54°13′38″E
- Country: Iran
- Province: Yazd
- County: Mehriz
- Bakhsh: Central
- Rural District: Ernan

Population (2006)
  - Total: 111
- Time zone: UTC+3:30 (IRST)
  - Summer (DST): UTC+4:30 (IRDT)

Kerdabad (Persian: كرداباد, also Romanized as Kerdābād and Kord Abad) is a village in Ernan Rural District, in the Central District of Mehriz County, Yazd Province, Iran. At the 2006 census, its population was 111, in 33 families.
