= Aliabad, Ernan =

Aliabad علي اباد
- Village
- Location within Iran
- Coordinates: 31°17′13″N 54°16′12″E
- Country: Iran
- Province: Yazd
- County: Mehriz
- Bakhsh: Central
- Rural District: Ernan

Population (2006)
  - Total: 332
- Time zone: UTC+3:30 (IRST)
  - Summer (DST): UTC+4:30 (IRDT)

Aliabad (Persian: علي اباد, also Romanized as ‘Alīābād; also known as ‘Alīābād-e Chehel Gazī, ‘Alīābād-e Ernān, and Deh Aliābād) is a village in Ernan Rural District, in the Central District of Mehriz County, Yazd Province, Iran. At the 2006 census, its population was 332, in 100 families.
