= Banadak Sadat =

Village in Yazd province, Iran

Banadak Sadat Persian: بنادك سادات
- Village
- Location within Iran
- Coordinates: 31°34′24″N 54°12′10″E
- Country: Iran
- Province: Yazd
- County: Mehriz
- District: Central
- Rural District: Miankuh

Population (2016)
  - Total: 292
- Time zone: UTC+3:30 (IRST)

Banadak Sadat (Persian: بنادك سادات) (Note: Also romanized as Banādak Sādāt and Banādak-e Sādāt; also known as Banadak, Banādak, Banātk, Būnāft, and Pāgodār-e Bonādak) is a village in, and the capital of, Miankuh Rural District of the Central District of Mehriz County, Yazd province, Iran.

== Demographics ==
=== Population ===
At the time of the 2006 National Census, the village's population was 402 in 166 households. The following census in 2011 counted 311 people in 118 households. The 2016 census measured the population of the village as 292 people in 125 households.
