= Arnan =

Arnan or Ernan (Persian: ارنان) may refer to:

- Arnan, East Azerbaijan
- Arnan, Kurdistan
- Ernan, Yazd
- Ernan Rural District, in Yazd Province
