= Moradabad, Yazd =

Village in Yazd province, Iran

Moradabad Persian: مراداباد
- Village
- Location within Iran
- Coordinates: 31°30′25″N 54°47′41″E
- Country: Iran
- Province: Yazd
- County: Mehriz
- District: Central
- Rural District: Bahadoran

Population (2016)
  - Total: 1,538
- Time zone: UTC+3:30 (IRST)

Moradabad (Persian: مراداباد) (Note: Also romanized as Morādābād; also known as Gardkūh) is a village in Bahadoran Rural District of the Central District of Mehriz County, Yazd province, Iran.

== Demographics ==
=== Population ===
At the time of the 2006 National Census, the village's population was 1,107 in 325 households. The following census in 2011 counted 1,184 people in 402 households. The 2016 census measured the population of the village as 1,538 people in 469 households. It was the most populous village in its rural district.
