= Badamak, Yazd =

Badamak بادامك
- Village
- Location within Iran
- Coordinates: 31°24′34″N 54°20′09″E
- Country: Iran
- Province: Yazd
- County: Mehriz
- Bakhsh: Central
- Rural District: Tang Chenar

Population (2006)
  - Total: 8
- Time zone: UTC+3:30 (IRST)
  - Summer (DST): UTC+4:30 (IRDT)

Badamak (Persian: بادامك, also Romanized as Bādāmak; also known as Mazra‘eh-ye Bādāmak) is a village in Tang Chenar Rural District, in the Central District of Mehriz County, Yazd Province, Iran. At the 2006 census, its population was 8, in 5 families.
