= Arzani =

Arzani is a surname. Notable people with the surname include:

- Carlos Arzani (1909–1952), Argentine racing driver
- Daniel Arzani (born 1999), Australian soccer player
- Mohsen Arzani (born 1984), Iranian soccer player

== See also ==
- Arzani-Volpini, Italian Formula One constructor
- Darreh Arzani, village in Iran
- Harzandiq, village in Iran
