= Tang Chenar =

Tang Chenar or Tang-e Chenar (Persian: تنگ چنار) may refer to:

- Tang Chenar, Yazd
- Tang Chenar Rural District, in Yazd Province
