= Mirokabad =

Village in Yazd province, Iran

Mirokabad Persian: ميرك اباد
- Village
- Location within Iran
- Coordinates: 31°32′35″N 54°26′59″E
- Country: Iran
- Province: Yazd
- County: Mehriz
- District: Central
- Rural District: Khvormiz

Population (2016)
  - Total: 532
- Time zone: UTC+3:30 (IRST)

Mirokabad (Persian: ميرك اباد) (Note: Also romanized as Mīrokābād; also known as Mīrūkābād) is a village in, and the capital of, Khvormiz Rural District of the Central District of Mehriz County, Yazd province, Iran.

== Demographics ==
=== Population ===
At the time of the 2006 National Census, the village's population was 571 in 170 households. The following census in 2011 counted 588 people in 180 households. The 2016 census measured the population of the village as 532 people in 181 households.
