= Darreh, Yazd =

Darreh دره
- Village
- Location within Iran
- Coordinates: 31°35′39″N 54°15′48″E
- Country: Iran
- Province: Yazd
- County: Mehriz
- Bakhsh: Central
- Rural District: Miankuh

Population (2006)
  - Total: 90
- Time zone: UTC+3:30 (IRST)
  - Summer (DST): UTC+4:30 (IRDT)

Darreh (Persian: دره; also known as Maḩalleh-ye Bālā Darreh) is a village in Miankuh Rural District, in the Central District of Mehriz County, Yazd Province, Iran. At the 2006 census, its population was 90, in 49 families.
