= Darreh Arzani =

Darreh Arzani دره ارزني
- Village
- Location within Iran
- Coordinates: 31°26′36″N 54°17′04″E
- Country: Iran
- Province: Yazd
- County: Mehriz
- Bakhsh: Central
- Rural District: Tang Chenar

Population (2006)
  - Total: 17
- Time zone: UTC+3:30 (IRST)
  - Summer (DST): UTC+4:30 (IRDT)

Darreh Arzani (Persian: دره ارزني, also romanized as Darreh Arzanī, Darreh Arzānī, and Darreh-ye Arzenī; also known as Dar-e Arzānī, Darreh Arzan, and Derah Arzāni) is a village in Tang Chenar Rural District, in the Central District of Mehriz County, Yazd Province, Iran. At the 2006 census, its population was 17, in 6 families.
