= Gol Afshad =

Gol Afshad گل افشاد
- Village
- Location within Iran
- Coordinates: 31°32′52″N 54°14′34″E
- Country: Iran
- Province: Yazd
- County: Mehriz
- Bakhsh: Central
- Rural District: Miankuh

Population (2006)
  - Total: 63
- Time zone: UTC+3:30 (IRST)
  - Summer (DST): UTC+4:30 (IRDT)

Gol Afshad (Persian: گل افشاد, also Romanized as Gol Afshād; also known as Gāv Afshād and Gol Afshān) is a village in Miankuh Rural District, in the Central District of Mehriz County, Yazd Province, Iran. At the 2006 census, its population was 63, in 35 families.
