= Khvormiz-e Sofla =

Khvormiz-e Sofla خورميزسفلي
- Village
- Location within Iran
- Coordinates: 31°32′00″N 54°27′00″E
- Country: Iran
- Province: Yazd
- County: Mehriz
- Bakhsh: Central
- Rural District: Khvormiz

Population (2006)
  - Total: 2,176
- Time zone: UTC+3:30 (IRST)
  - Summer (DST): UTC+4:30 (IRDT)

Khvormiz-e Sofla (Persian: خورميزسفلي, also Romanized as Khvormīz-e Soflá and Khowrmīz-e Soflá; also known as Khowrmīz-e Pā’īn) is a village in Khvormiz Rural District, in the Central District of Mehriz County, Yazd Province, Iran. At the 2006 census, its population was 2,176, in 551 families.
