= Amirabad, Mehriz =

Village in Yazd province, Iran

Amirabad Persian: امیرآباد
- Village
- Location within Iran
- Coordinates: 31°24′07″N 54°21′15″E
- Country: Iran
- Province: Yazd
- County: Mehriz
- District: Central
- Rural District: Tang Chenar

Population (2016)
  - Total: 289
- Time zone: UTC+3:30 (IRST)

Amirabad (Persian: امیرآباد) is a village in Tang Chenar Rural District of the Central District of Mehriz County, Yazd province, Iran.

== Demographics ==
=== Population ===
At the time of the 2016 National Census, the village's population was 289 people in 98 households. It was the most populous village in its rural district. (Note: The village did not appear in the 2006 and 2011 censuses)
