= Sarv, Yazd =

Village in Yazd province, Iran

Sarv Persian: سرو
- Village
- Location within Iran
- Coordinates: 31°19′01″N 54°10′15″E
- Country: Iran
- Province: Yazd
- County: Mehriz
- District: Central
- Rural District: Ernan

Population (2016)
  - Total: 451
- Time zone: UTC+3:30 (IRST)

Sarv (Persian: سرو) is a village in Ernan Rural District of the Central District of Mehriz County, Yazd province, Iran.

== Demographics ==
=== Population ===
At the time of the 2006 National Census, the village's population was 627 in 205 households. The following census in 2011 counted 431 people in 153 households. The 2016 census measured the population of the village as 451 people in 158 households. It was the most populous village in its rural district.
