= Bahadoran, Yazd =

Village in Yazd province, Iran

Bahadoran Persian: مراداباد
- Village
- Location within Iran
- Coordinates: 31°19′25″N 54°55′10″E
- Country: Iran
- Province: Yazd
- County: Mehriz
- District: Central
- Rural District: Bahadoran

Population (2016)
  - Total: 1,236
- Time zone: UTC+3:30 (IRST)

Bahadoran (Persian: بهادران) (Note: Also romanized as Bahādorān; also known as Bandarūn) is a village in, and the capital of, Bahadoran Rural District of the Central District of Mehriz County, Yazd province, Iran.

== Demographics ==
=== Population ===
At the time of the 2006 National Census, the village's population was 1,105 in 289 households. The following census in 2011 counted 1,213 people in 352 households. The 2016 census measured the population of the village as 1,236 people in 358 households.
