= Khvormiz-e Olya =

Village in Yazd province, Iran

Khvormiz-e Olya Persian: خورميز عليا
- Village
- Location within Iran
- Coordinates: 31°31′45″N 54°26′11″E
- Country: Iran
- Province: Yazd
- County: Mehriz
- District: Central
- Rural District: Khvormiz

Population (2016)
  - Total: 2,198
- Time zone: UTC+3:30 (IRST)

Khvormiz-e Olya (Persian: خورميزعليا) (Note: Also romanized as Khowrmīz-e ‘Olyā and Khvormīz-e ‘Olyā; also known as Kharmiz, Khoormiz, Khormehr, Khormīz, Khūrmīz, Khūrmīz-e Bālā, Khvormehr, Khvormīz, and Khvormīz) is a village in Khvormiz Rural District of the Central District of Mehriz County, Yazd province, Iran.

== Demographics ==
=== Population ===
At the time of the 2006 National Census, the village's population was 1,870 in 472 households. The following census in 2011 counted 1,860 people in 536 households. The 2016 census measured the population of the village as 2,198 people in 636 households. It was the most populous village in its rural district.
