= Tang Chenar, Yazd =

Village in Yazd province, Iran

Tang Chenar Persian: تنگ چنار
- Village
- Location within Iran
- Coordinates: 31°23′48″N 54°20′38″E
- Country: Iran
- Province: Yazd
- County: Mehriz
- District: Central
- Rural District: Tang Chenar

Population (2016)
  - Total: 82
- Time zone: UTC+3:30 (IRST)

Tang Chenar (Persian: تنگ چنار) (Note: Also romanized as Tang Chenār and Tang-e Chenār) is a village in, and the capital of, Tang Chenar Rural District of the Central District of Mehriz County, Yazd province, Iran.

== Demographics ==
=== Population ===
At the time of the 2006 National Census, the village's population was 802 in 234 households. The following census in 2011 counted 771 people in 261 households. The 2016 census measured the population of the village as 82 people in 32 households.
