= Manshad =

Village in Yazd province, Iran

Manshad Persian: منشاد
- Village
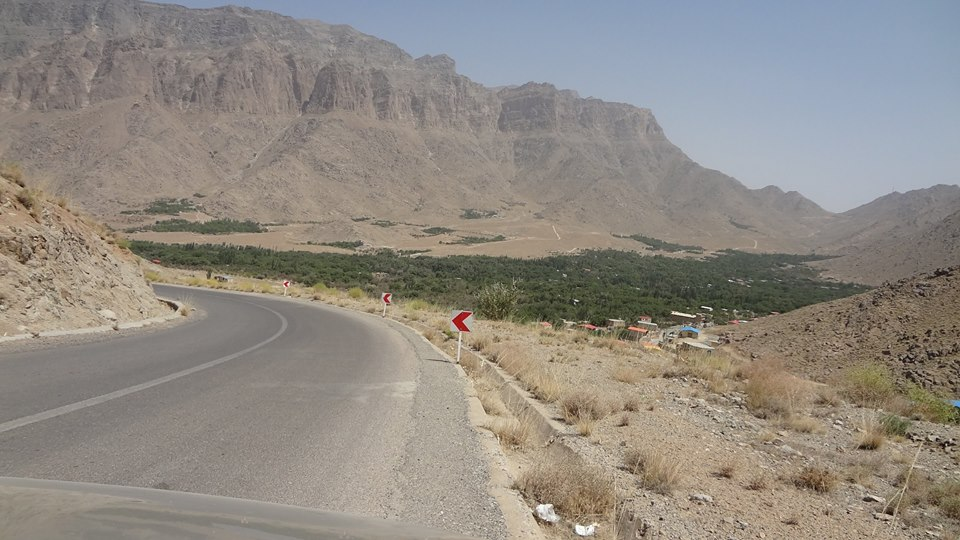
- Manshad village

- Location within Iran
- Coordinates: 31°31′45″N 54°13′05″E
- Country: Iran
- Province: Yazd
- County: Mehriz
- District: Central
- Rural District: Miankuh

Population (2016)
  - Total: 345
- Time zone: UTC+3:30 (IRST)

Manshad (Persian: منشاد) (Note: Also romanized as Manshād; also known as Darreh) is a village in Miankuh Rural District of the Central District of Mehriz County, Yazd province, Iran.

== Demographics ==
=== Population ===
At the time of the 2006 National Census, the village's population was 430 in 204 households. The following census in 2011 counted 330 people in 161 households. The 2016 census measured the population of the village as 345 people in 176 households. It was the most populous village in its rural district.
