= Ernan, Yazd =

Village in Yazd province, Iran

Ernan Persian: ارنان
- Village
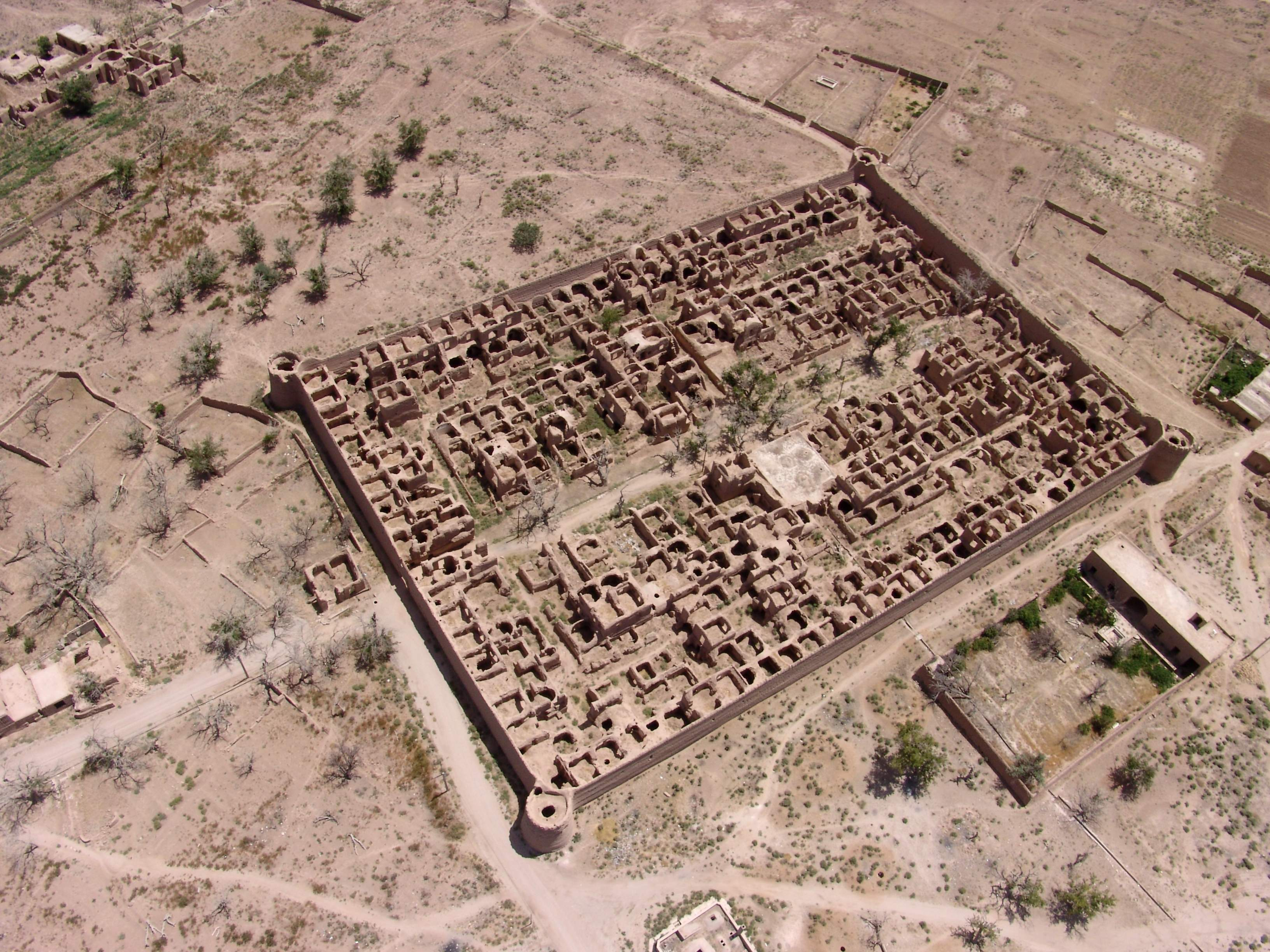
- Ernan Castle

- Location within Iran
- Coordinates: 31°19′11″N 54°09′19″E
- Country: Iran
- Province: Yazd
- County: Mehriz
- District: Central
- Rural District: Ernan

Population (2016)
  - Total: 296
- Time zone: UTC+3:30 (IRST)

Ernan (Persian: ارنان) (Note: Also romanized as Ernān; also known as Arnūn and Arnūn-e Bālā) is a village in, and the capital of, Ernan Rural District of the Central District of Mehriz County, Yazd province, Iran.

== Demographics ==
=== Population ===
At the time of the 2006 National Census, the village's population was 394 in 115 households. The following census in 2011 counted 296 people in 97 households. The 2016 census measured the population of the village as 296 people in 106 households.

== Tourism ==
=== National Heritage Site ===
Ernan Castle is related to the Qajar Empire and is located in Mehriz County.
