= Mehrpadin Castle =

Coordinates: 31.5837°N 54.4579°E

- قلعه مهرپادین
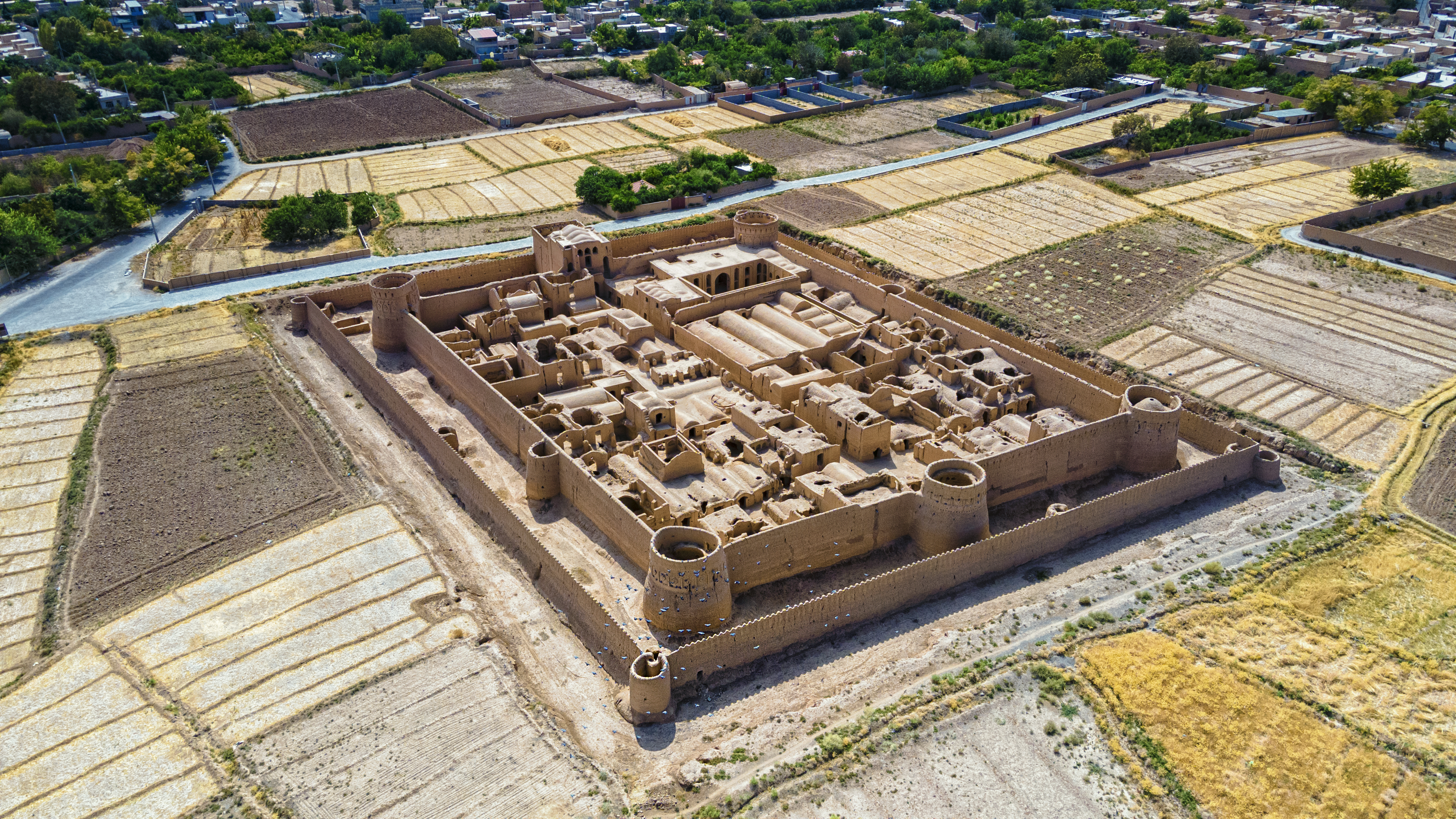
- Interactive map of the Mehrpadin Castle area

General information
- Location: Yazd province, Iran
- Completed: 14th century

Technical details
- Size: 160*148 meters

Mehrpadin Castle (Persian: قلعه مهرپادین) is a 14th-century castle in Mehriz County, Yazd province, Iran.

== History ==
There is a disagreement on when this castle was constructed. According to some, it was built during Mozaffarid era, others claim it is a Safavid structure, while another group attribute it to Afsharid era.

The local story, however, states that during the Mongol invasion, the Mongols slaughtered the entire population of the city of Mehrijerd, but spared one infant boy and gave him to the inhabitants of the nearby village of Saryazd. When the boy grew up, in order to prevent this from happening ever again, he returned to his homeland and created the castle, so that people would be safe in times of raids and wars.

The castle was never used as a permanent residence, but as a place for temporary residence in event of raids, in which case they often used smoke to signal other castles and ask for help.

It was listed in the national heritage sites of Iran with the number 6,143 on 29 September 2002.

== Description ==
The castle consists of two layers of walls and nine round towers, and the entire castle is surrounded by a large moat. The walls are approximately 6.5 meters (21 ft) in height, and the towers of the inner layer are 8.5 meters (28 ft) tall. Interior of the castle includes structures like houses, governor's seat, religious buildings, stables and storehouses.

== Gallery ==
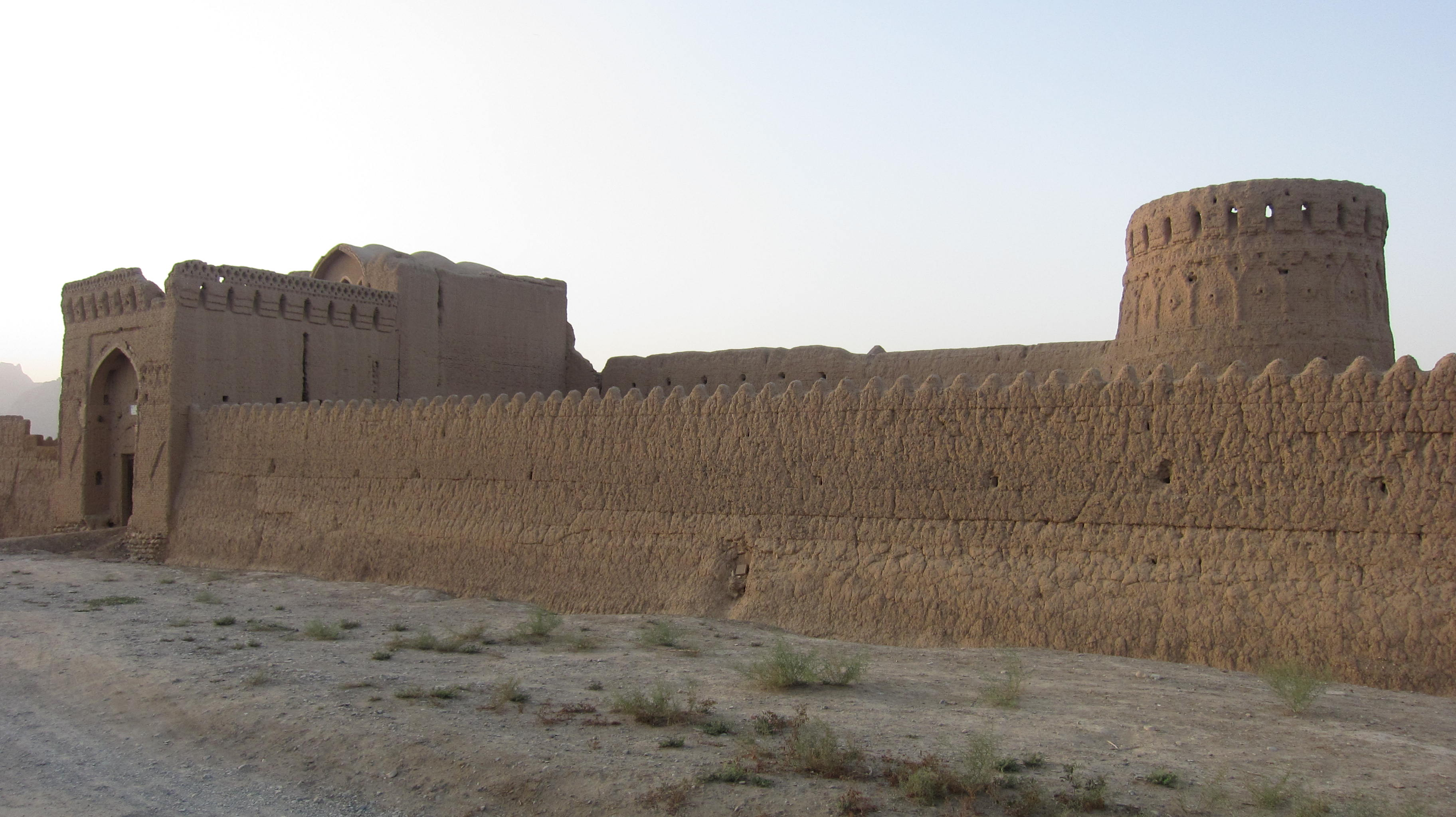

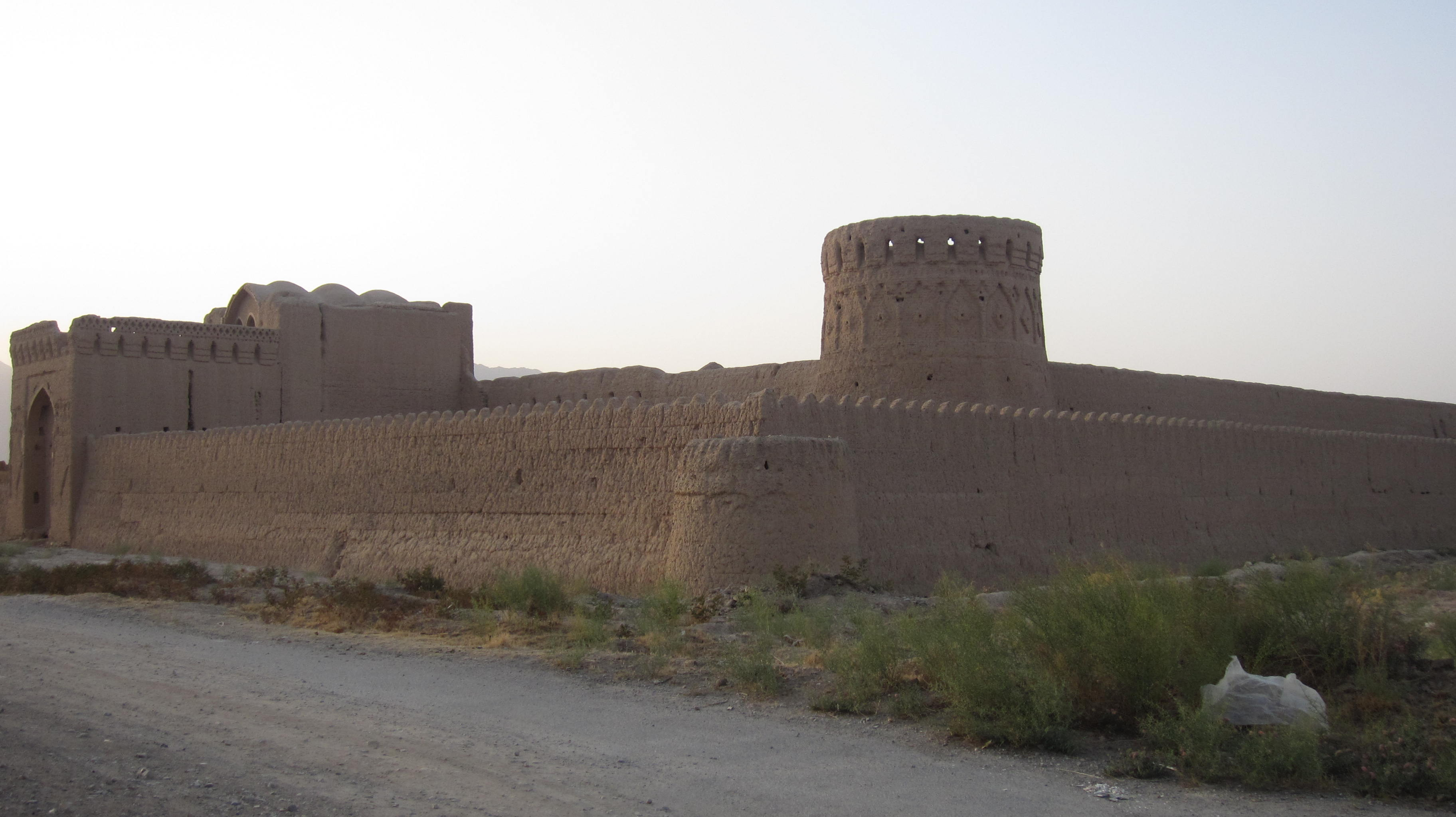

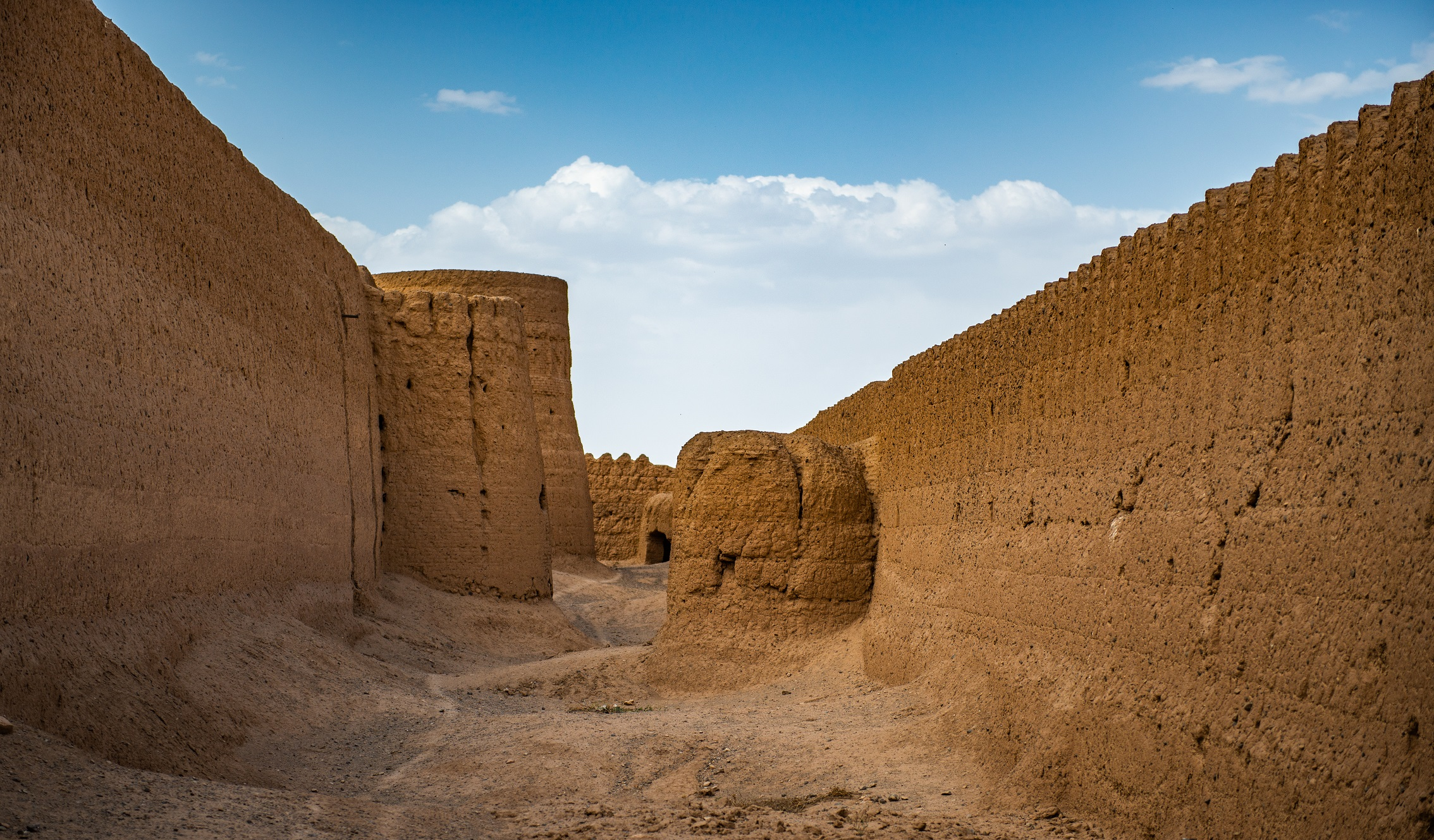

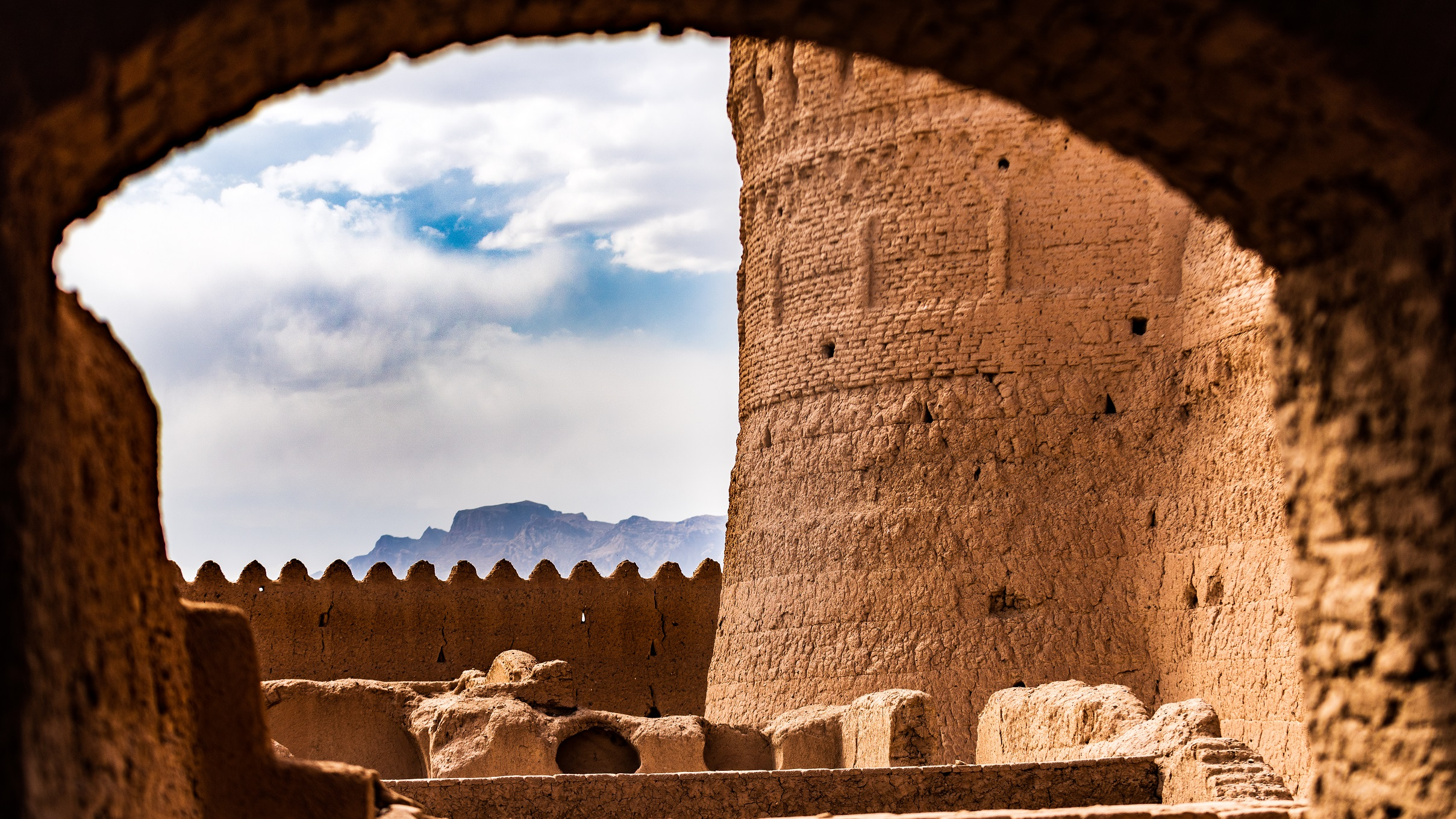

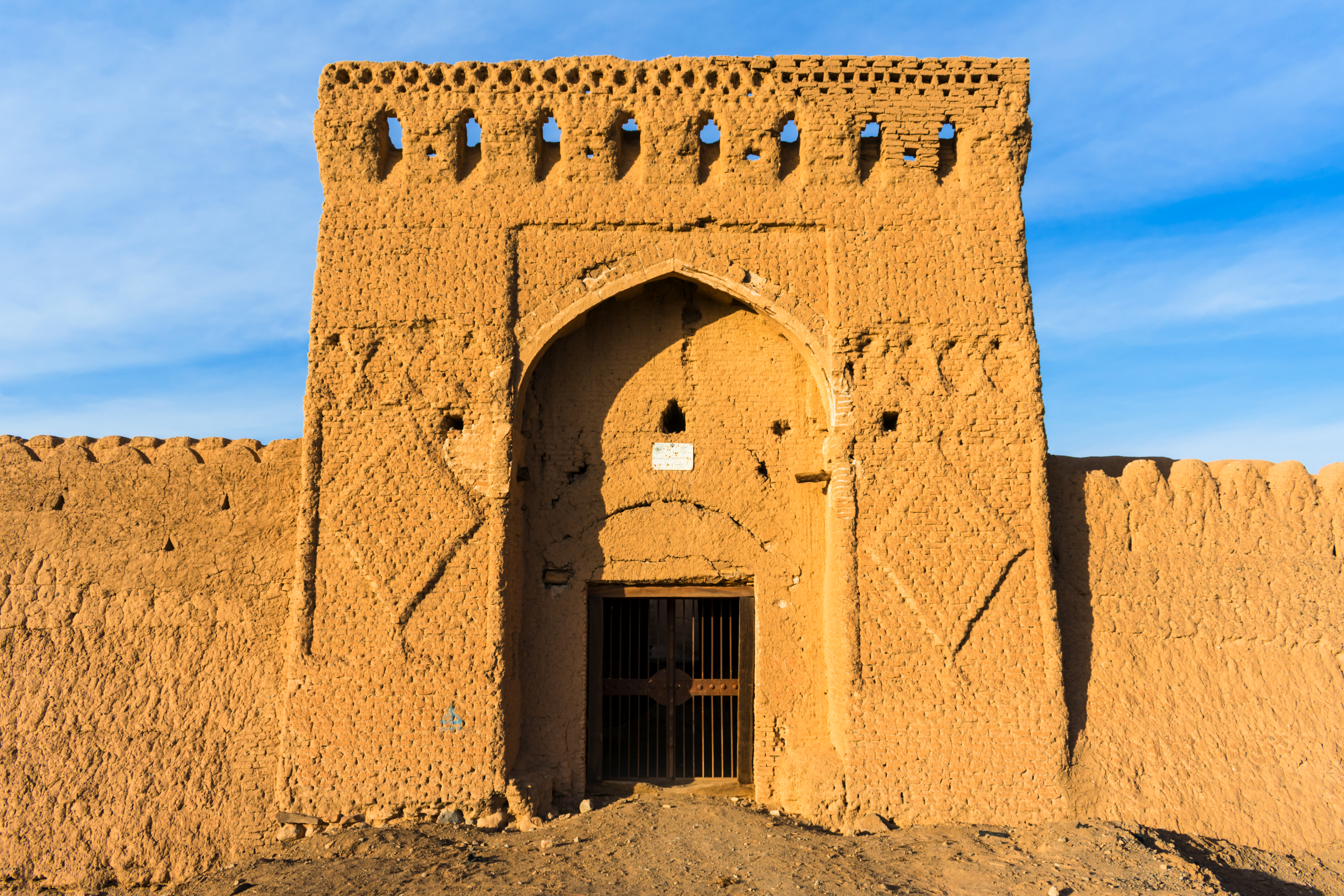

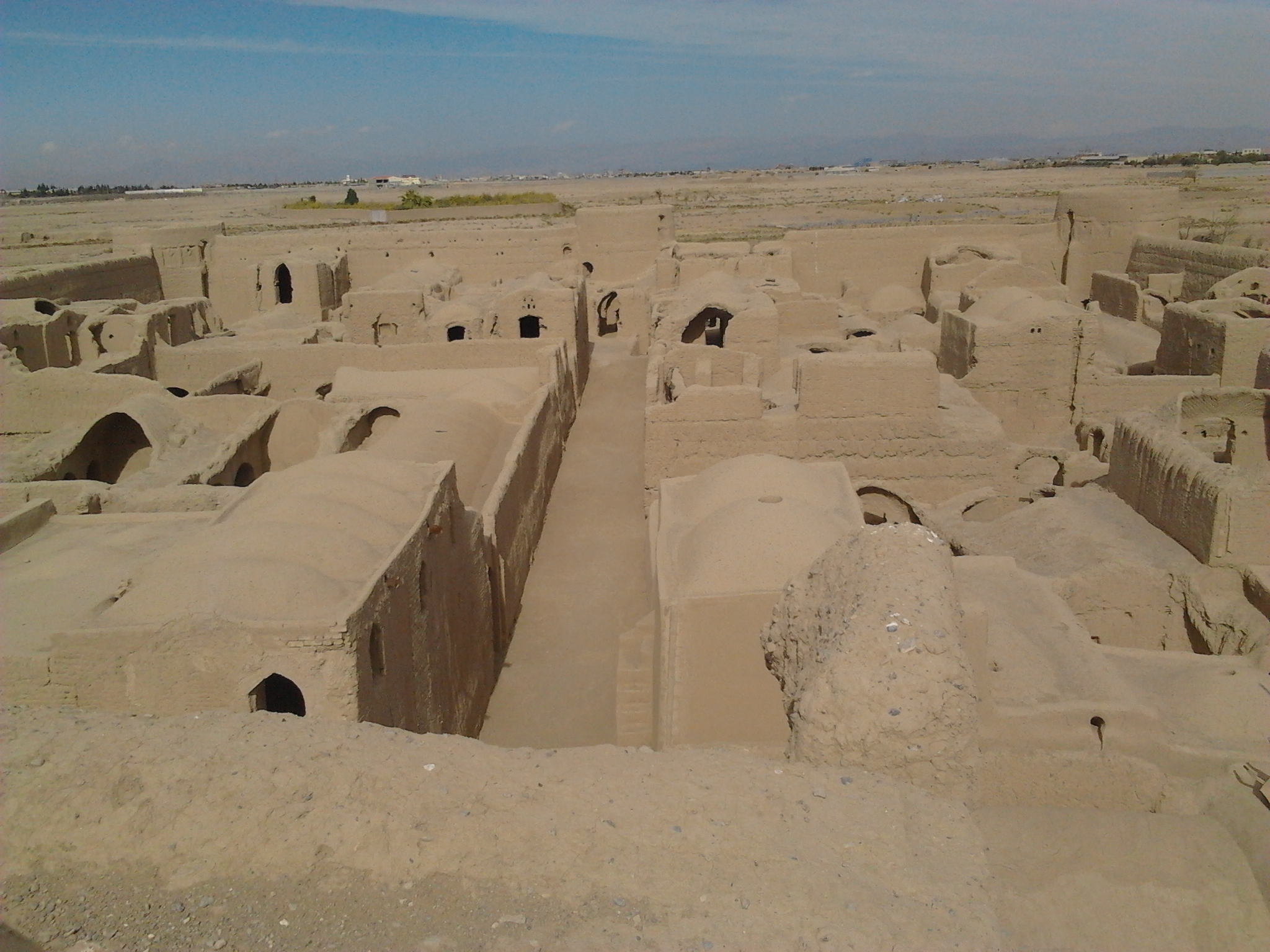
