= Gol Afshan =

Gol Afshan or Golafshan (Persian: گل افشان) may refer to:

- Gol Afshan, Isfahan
- Gol Afshan, Mazandaran
- Gol Afshan, Yazd
