= Sar Yazd Fortress =

Sar Yazd Castle
- قلعه سریزد
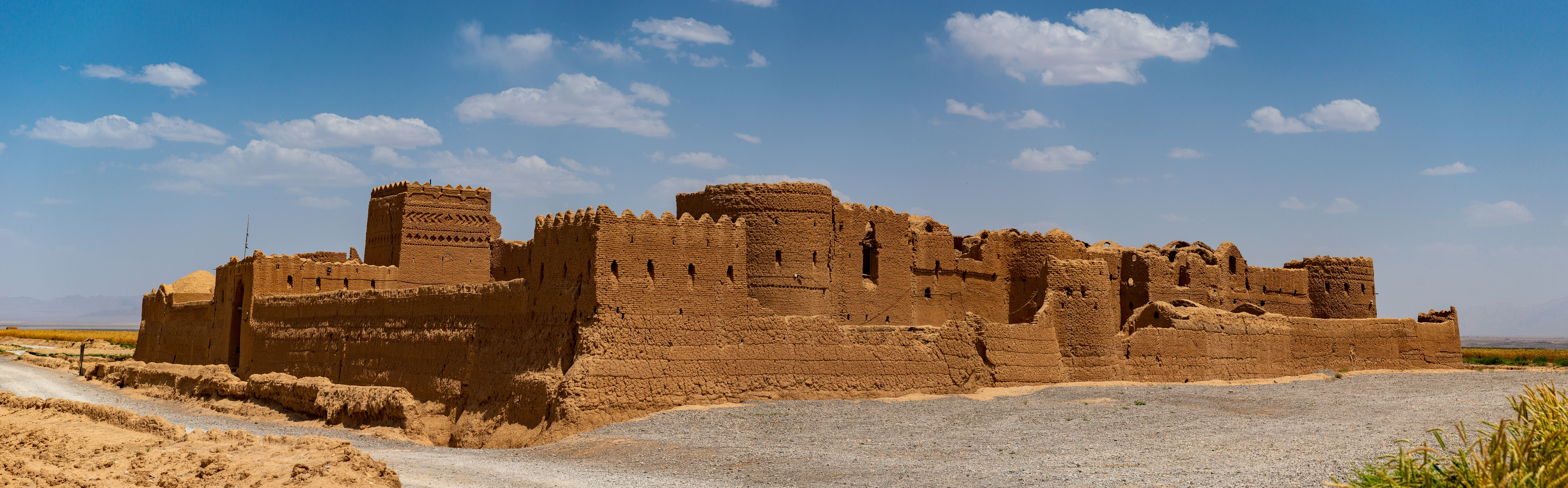
- Interactive map of the Sar Yazd Castle area

General information
- Type: Castle
- Architectural style: Iranian architecture
- Location: Sar Yazd, Iran

Sar Yazd Castle (Persian: قلعه سريزد) alternatively spelled Saryazd is a Sassanid fortification in the village of Sar Yazd, Yazd Province, Iran. It is located 50 kilometers south of the city of Yazd. The fortress was constructed at the intersection of the Silk Road and the Spice Route.

== Background ==
Yazd was a major city and Zoroastrian religious center in Sassanid times and the castle was used as a safe deposit box in the case of invasion, in which the residents could store valuables such as gold and jewels as well as other items such as food or grain. In the ancient world, invasion or raiding parties would look for valuable loot, while also pillaging for food for sustenance - therefore it was of importance to keep such commodities out of enemy reach.

== Construction ==
The fortress was constructed during the Sassanid era, sometime between the 3rd and 7th centuries AD and is made of adobe. Its defences are two concentric walls, the outer wall being six meters in height and the inner being nine meters tall. In addition to the walls a moat was also constructed. The structure contains 480 rooms which could only be opened by its occupiers.

== Modern Condition ==
The structure is in varying states of ruin. In modern times the castle has become a tourist attraction and is located near two caravansaries.

Saryazd Castle was registered in national index by the Iranian Cultural Heritage Organization with number 1084 in 1975.

== Gallery ==
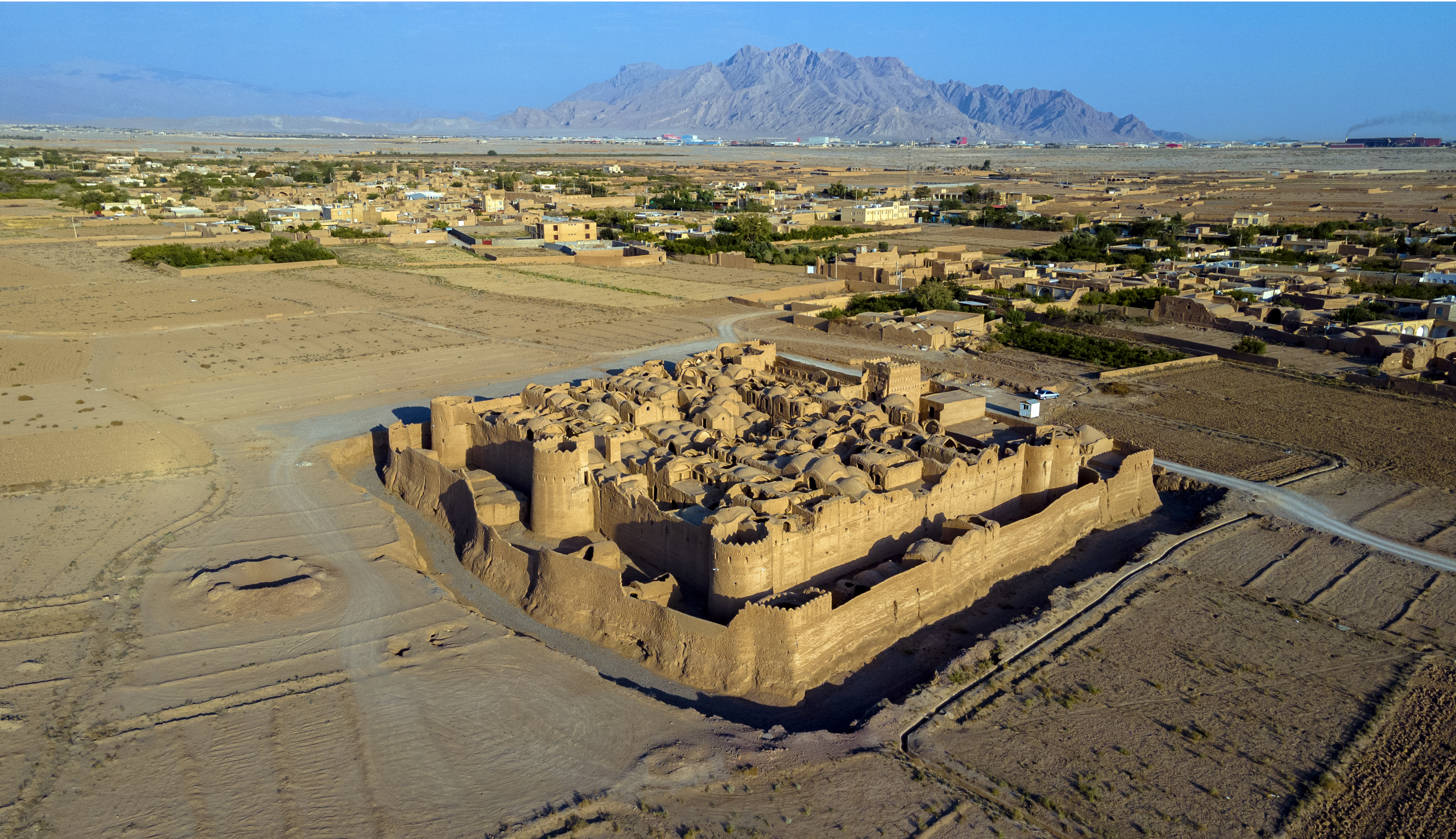

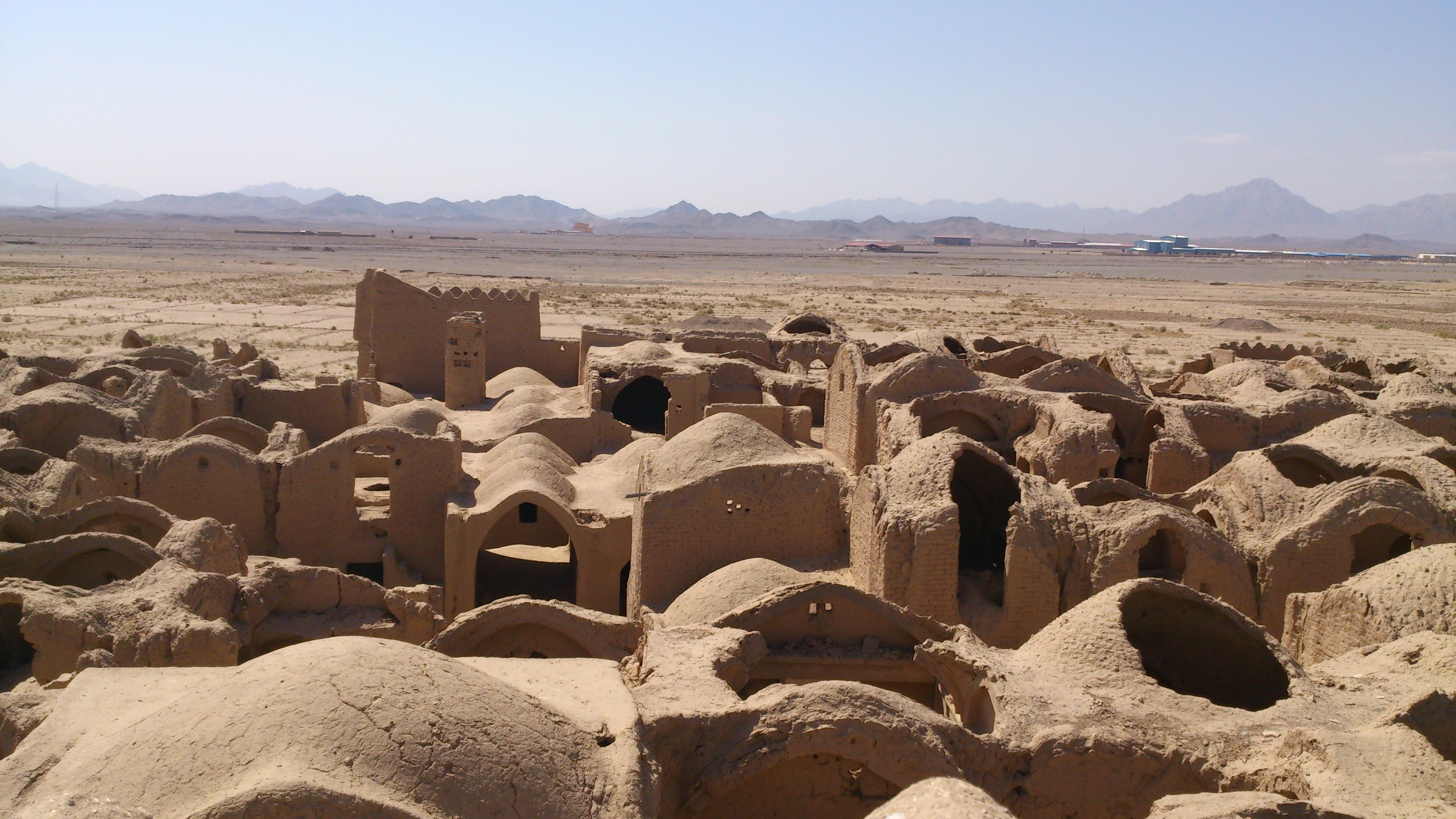

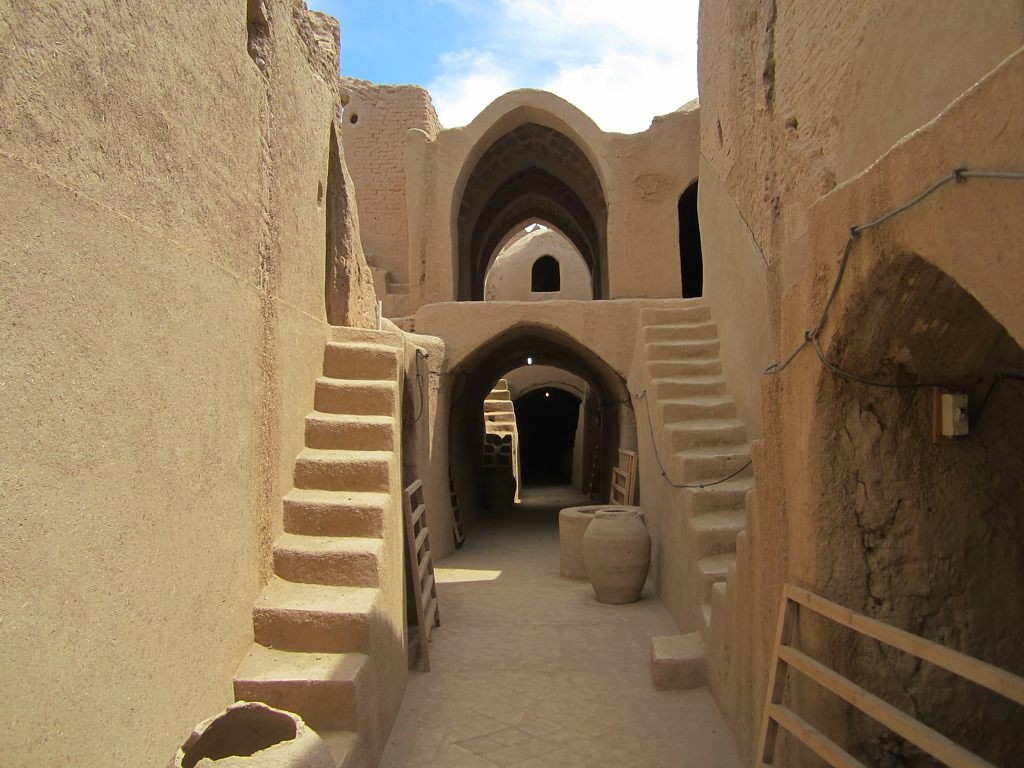

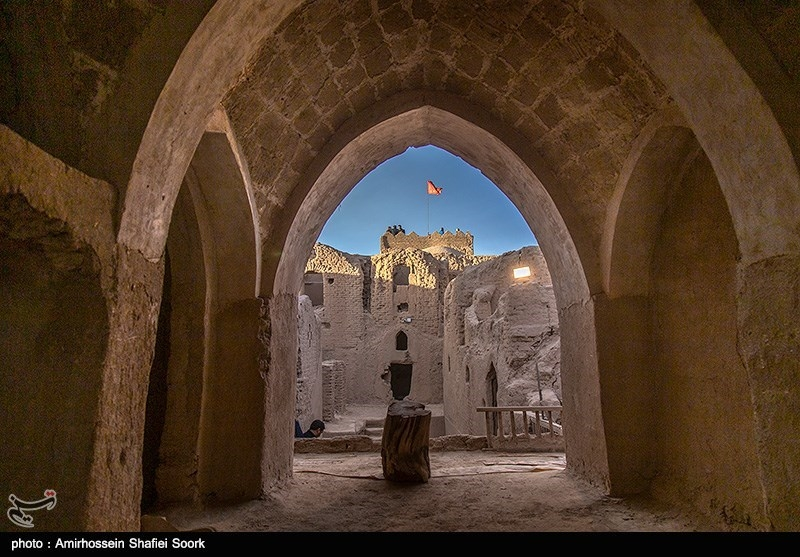
