= Mehriz =

City in Yazd province, Iran

Mehriz Persian: مهريز
- City
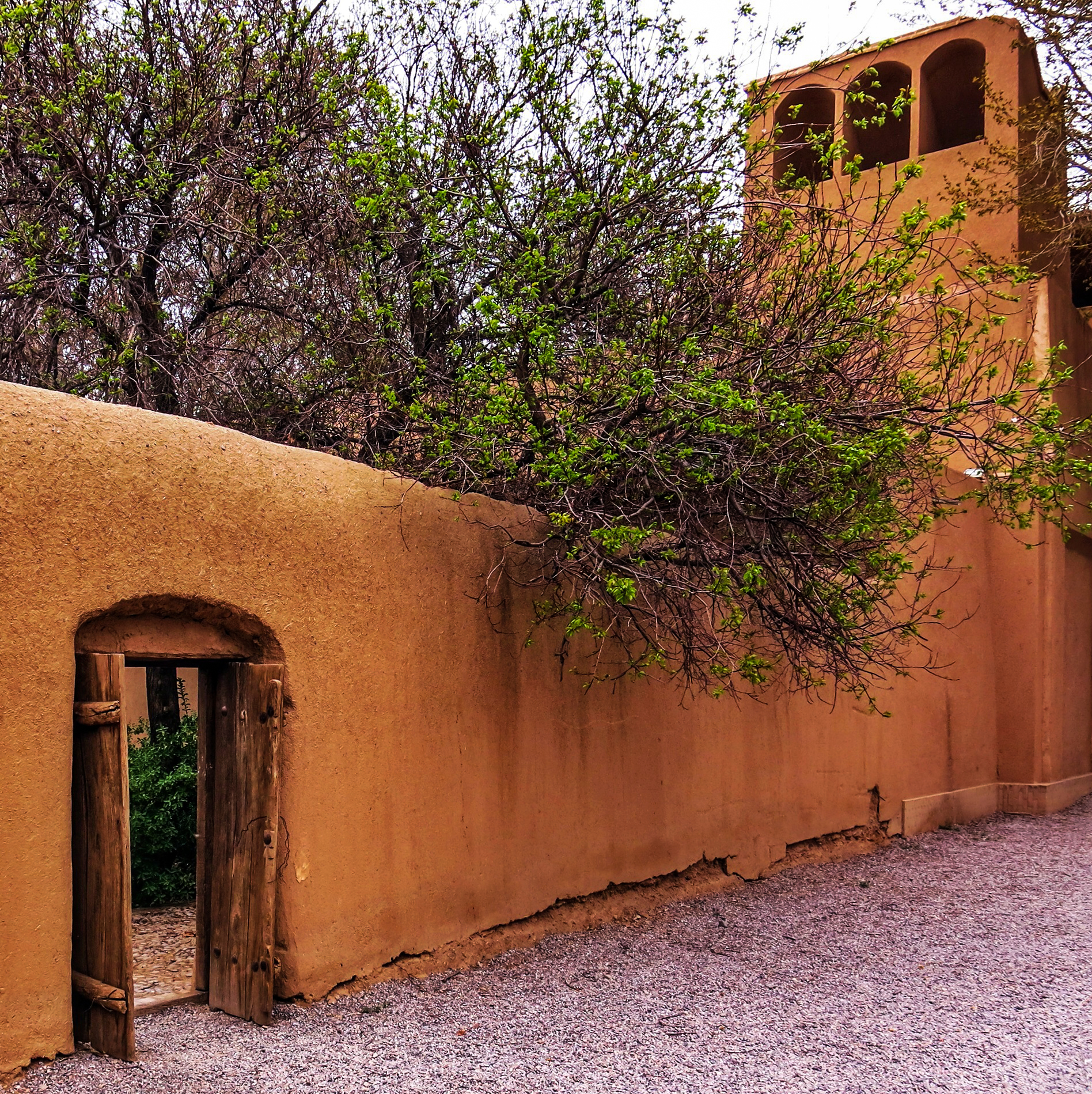
- Pahlavanpoor Garden, Mehriz

- Location within Iran
- Coordinates: 31°35′05″N 54°25′48″E
- Country: Iran
- Province: Yazd
- County: Mehriz
- District: Central

Population (2016)
  - Total: 34,237
- Time zone: UTC+3:30 (IRST)

Mehriz (Persian: مهريز) (Note: Also romanized as Mehrīz) is a city in the Central District of Mehriz County, Yazd province, Iran, serving as capital of both the county and the district. It lies along the transit highway connecting Bandar Abbas to Tehran, and it marks the beginning of the highway under construction from Mehriz to Neyriz.

== History ==
Mehriz, formerly known as Mehrgard, later changed to Mehrjerd and Mehriz, owes its name to the directive of Mehrnegar, the daughter of Anushiravan (Khosrow I), a Sassanian king. Situated in the central part of the Yazd province, Mehriz is renowned for its historical and cultural significance. Some of its attractions include:

- Zeen al-Din Caravanserai: A historic caravanserai that served as a resting place for travelers along the ancient trade routes.
- Mehrpadin Complex: This includes a castle (known as Mehrpadin Castle), which dates back to ancient times.
- Zoroastrian Pirnakki Shrine: A sacred site associated with Zoroastrianism.
- Sariz Castle: An ancient fortress with a rich history.
- Pahlavanpour Mansion: An elegant historical building.
- Tallest Wind Tower (Badgir): Mehriz boasts the tallest wind tower in Iran.
- Round Caravanserai: The only circular caravanserai in the country.

In addition to these, Mehriz has over 600 historical and cultural remnants, with 89 of them registered as national heritage sites in Iran. The city’s heritage dates back more than 10,000 years, as evidenced by the rock carvings on Mount Arnan.

== Demographics ==
=== Population ===
At the time of the 2006 National Census, the city's population was 26,364 in 6,954 households. The following census in 2011 counted 28,483 people in 8,149 households. The 2016 census measured the population of the city as 34,237 people in 10,344 households.

== Gallery ==
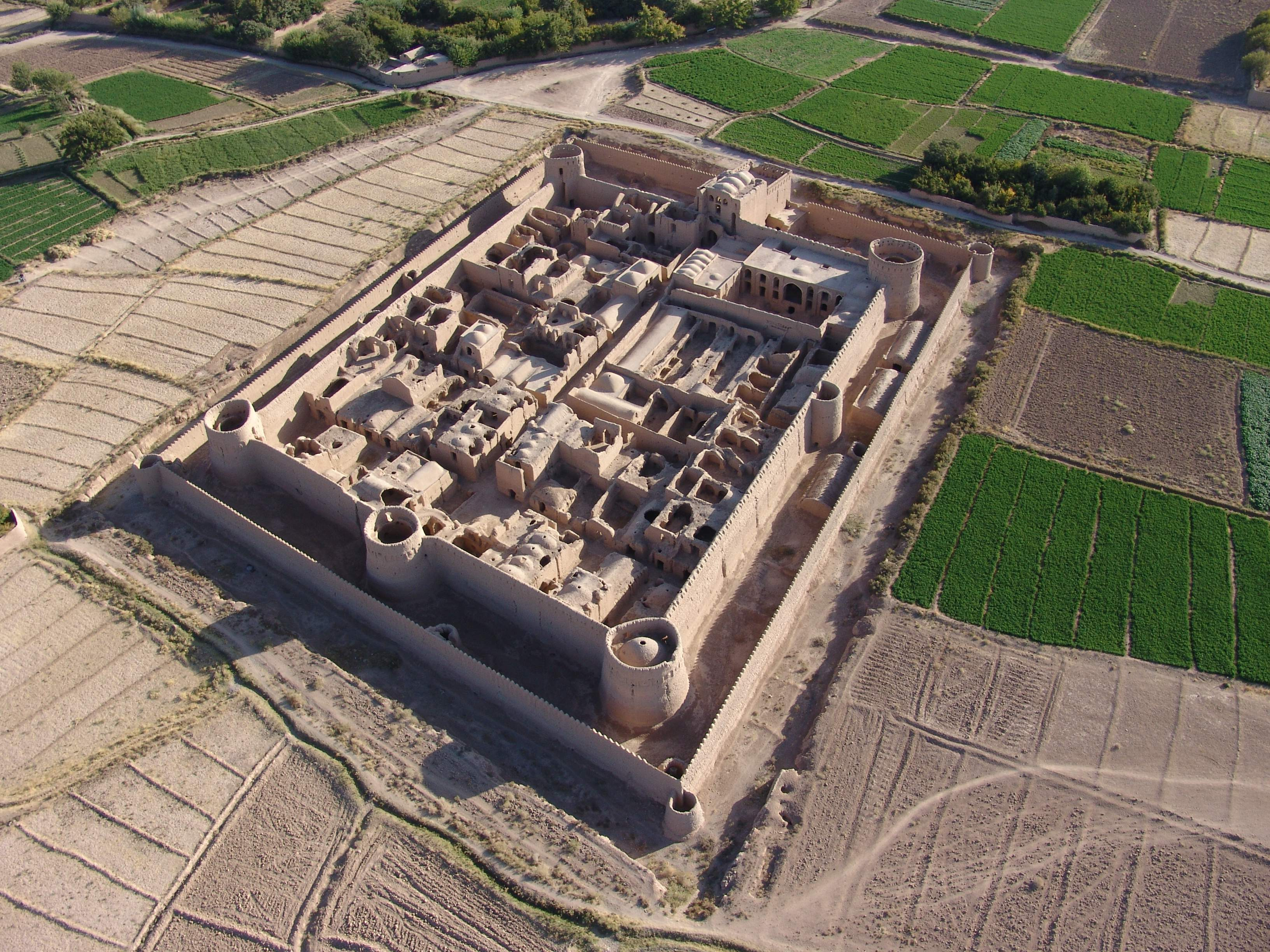
Mehrpadin Castle

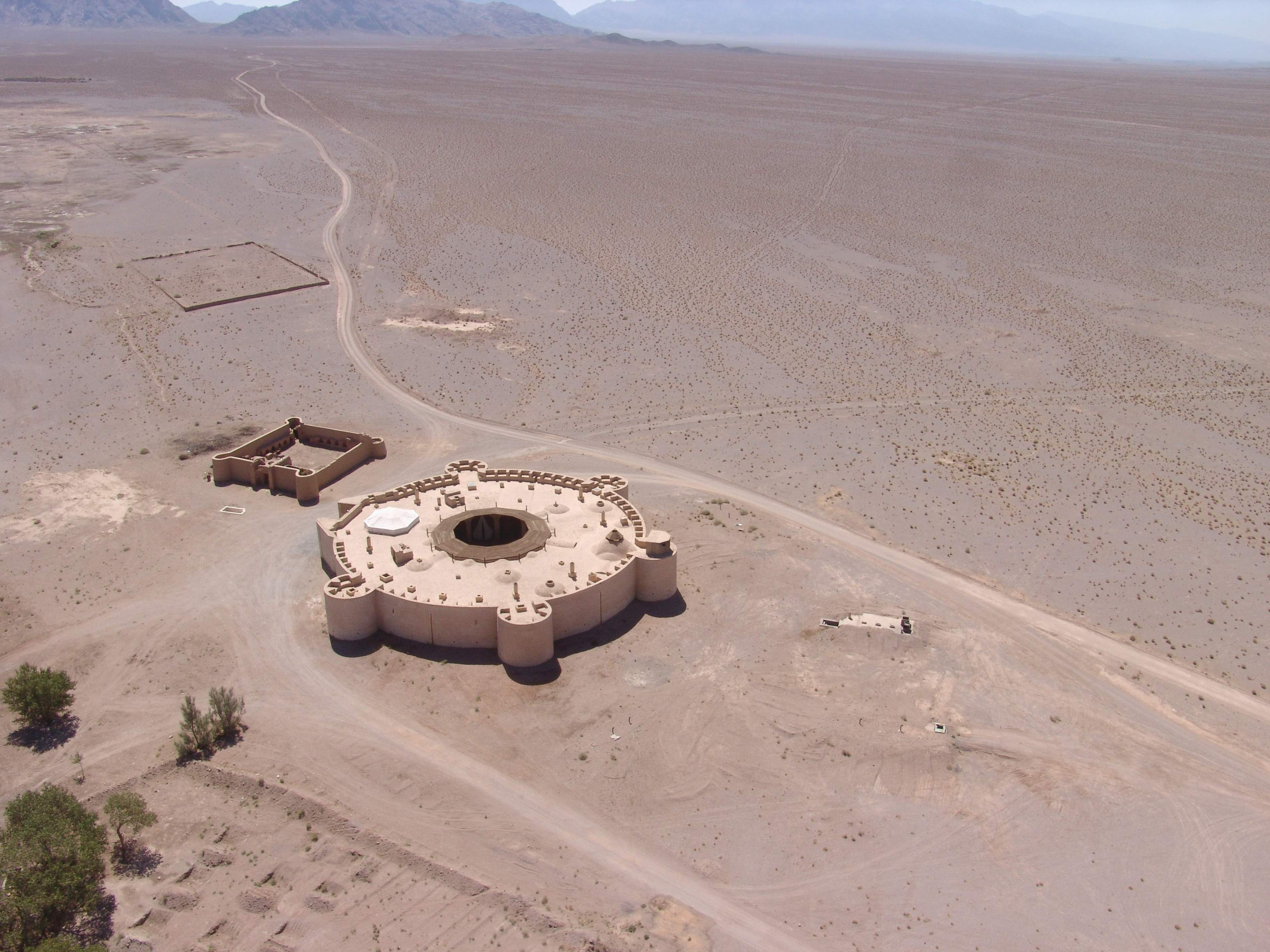
Zein Aldin Castle

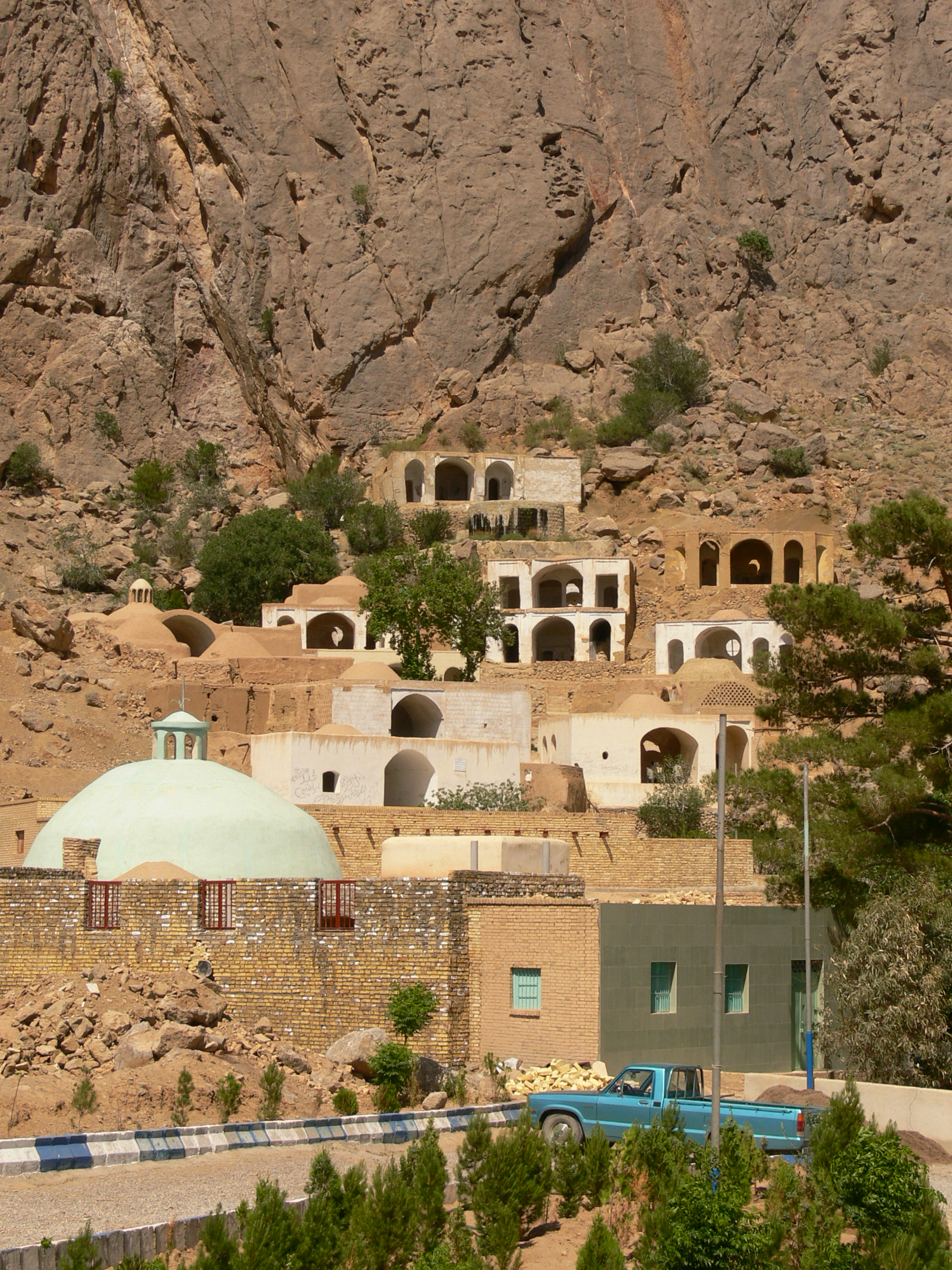
Pir-e-Naraki Sanctuary

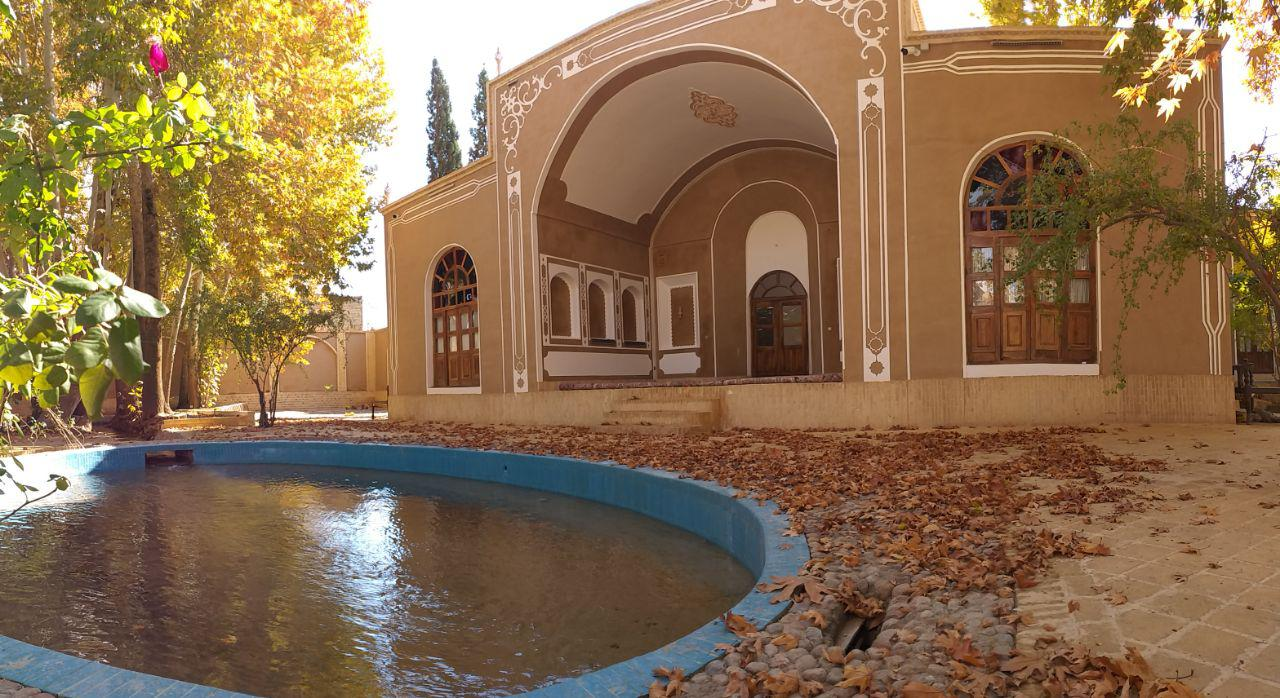
Khoshnevis Garden

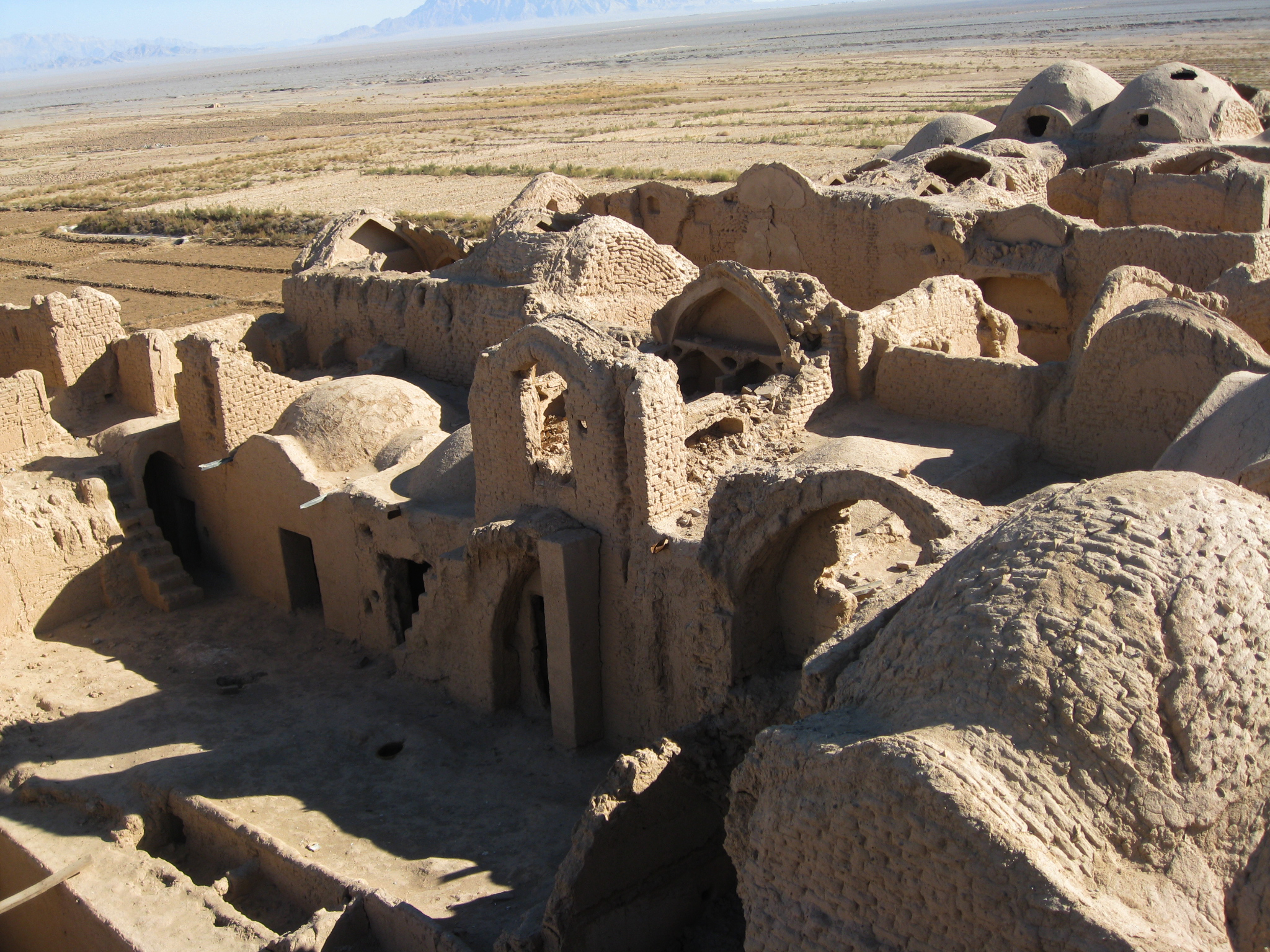
Sar Yazd Castle

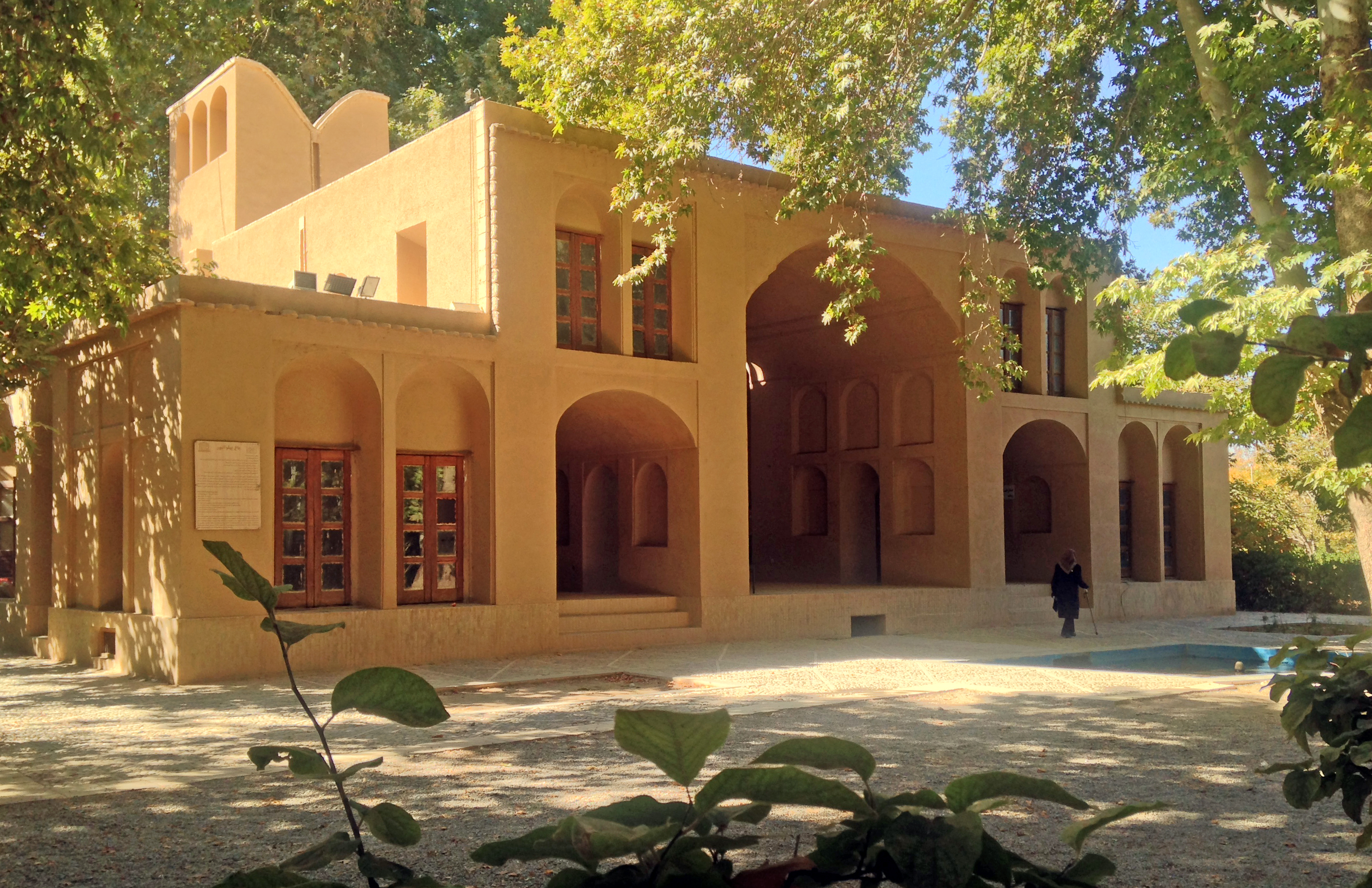
Pahlavanpour Garden

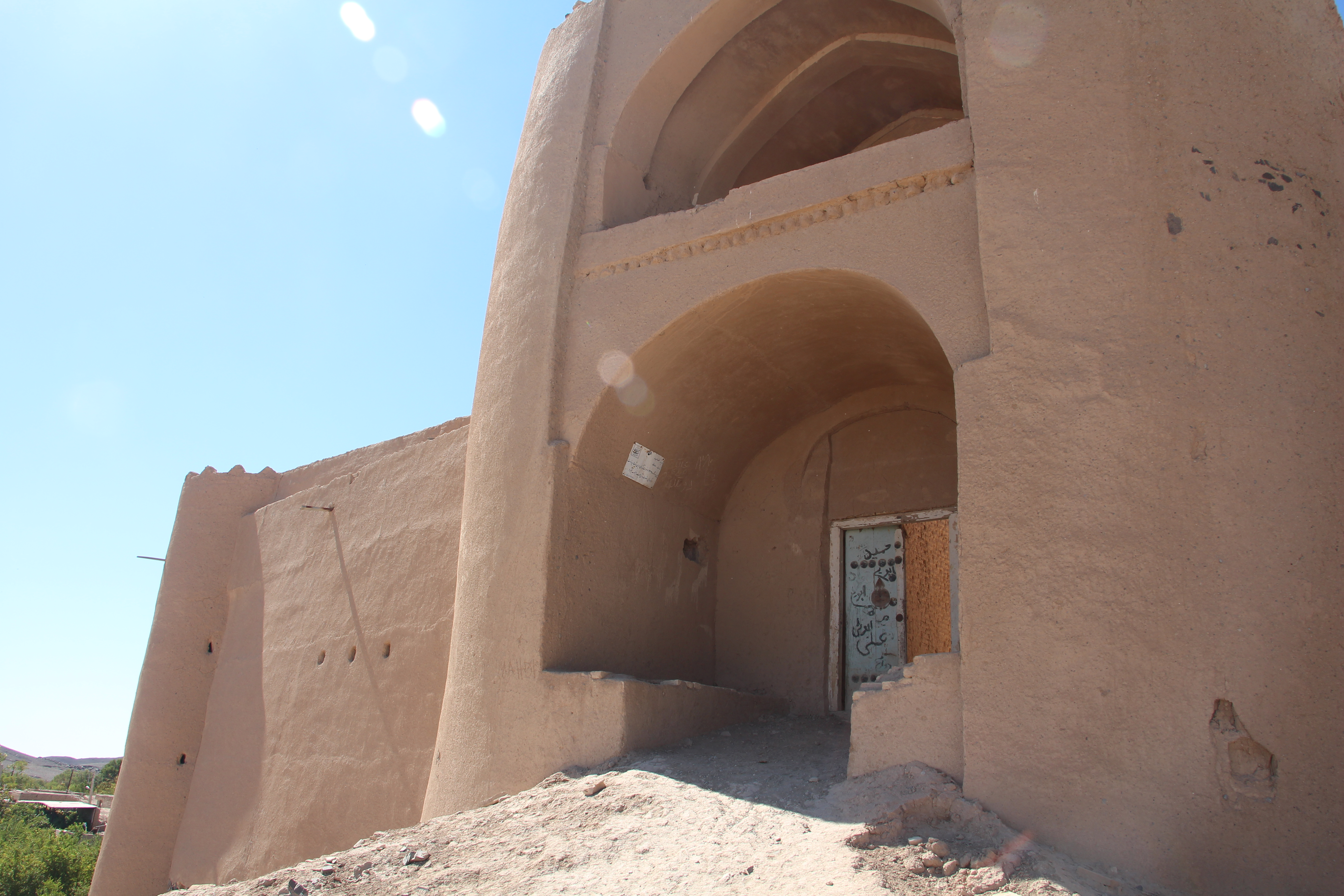
Khormiz Castle

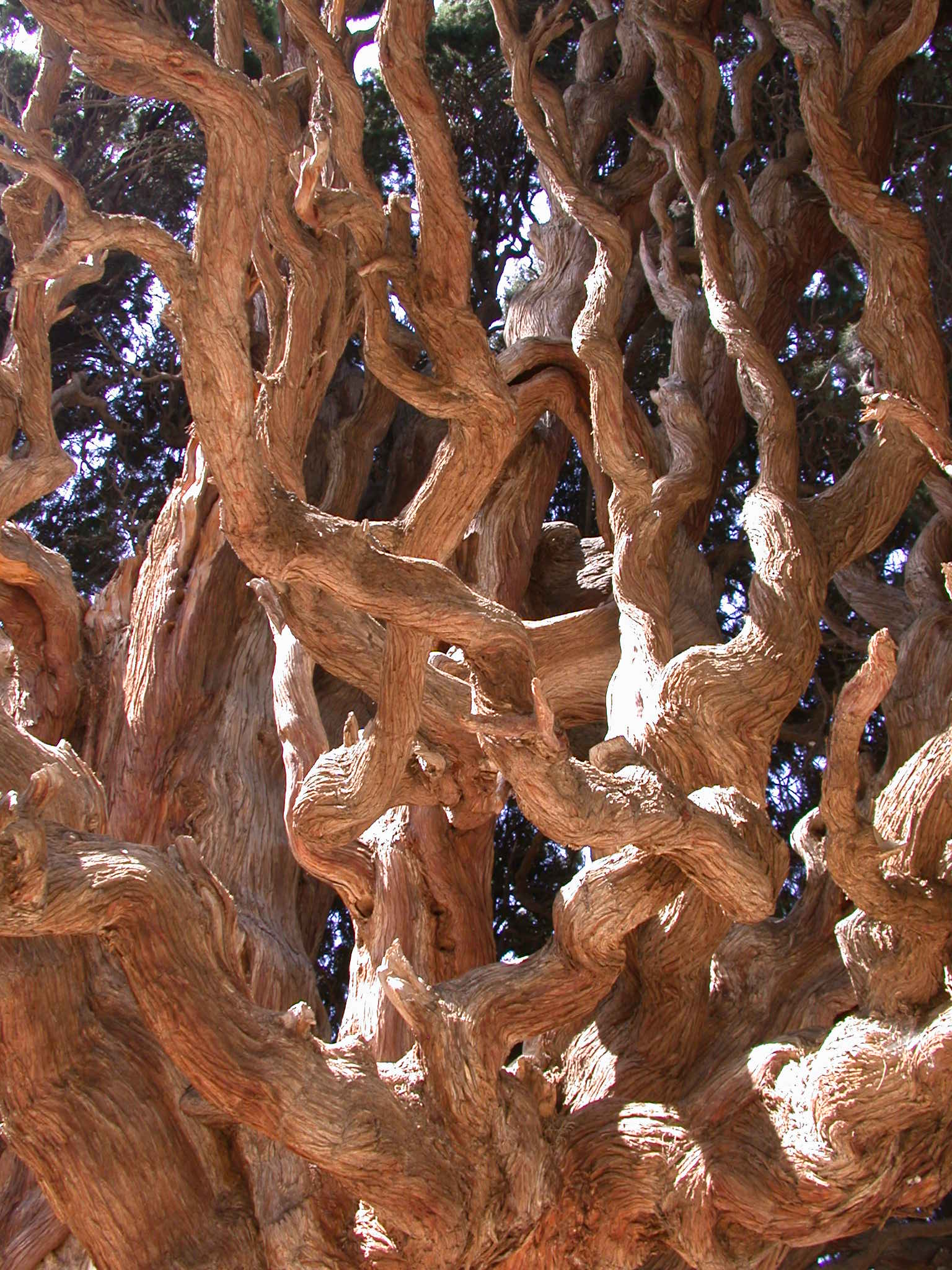
Mongabad cypress

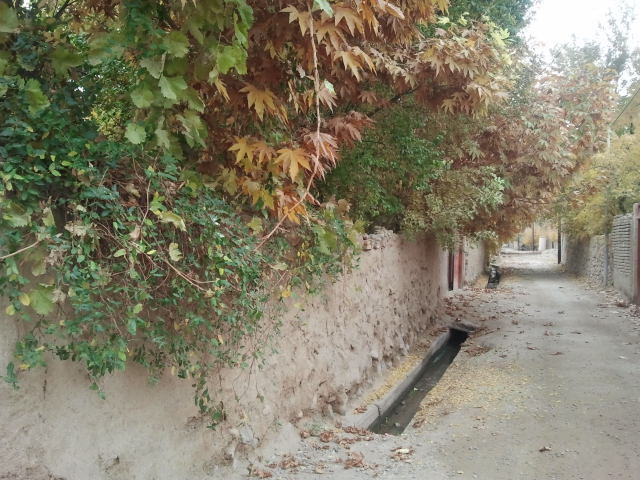
S̄ānīābād

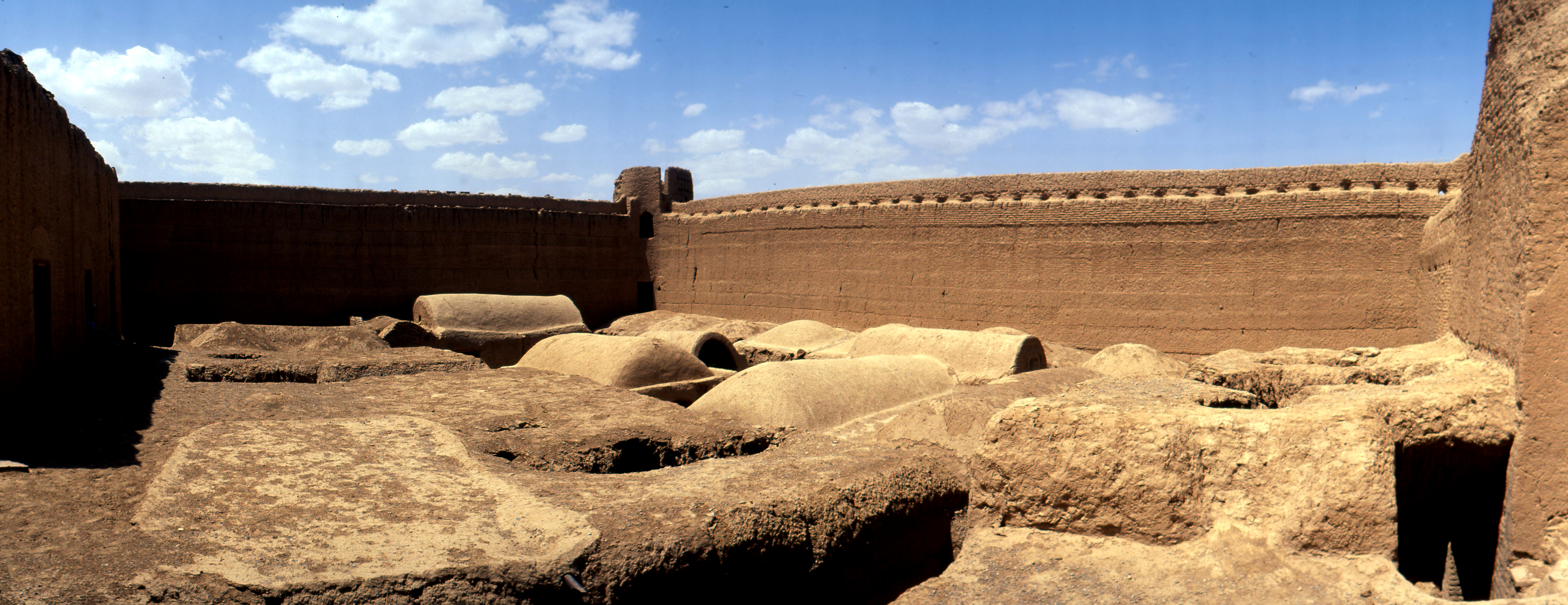
Khvormiz

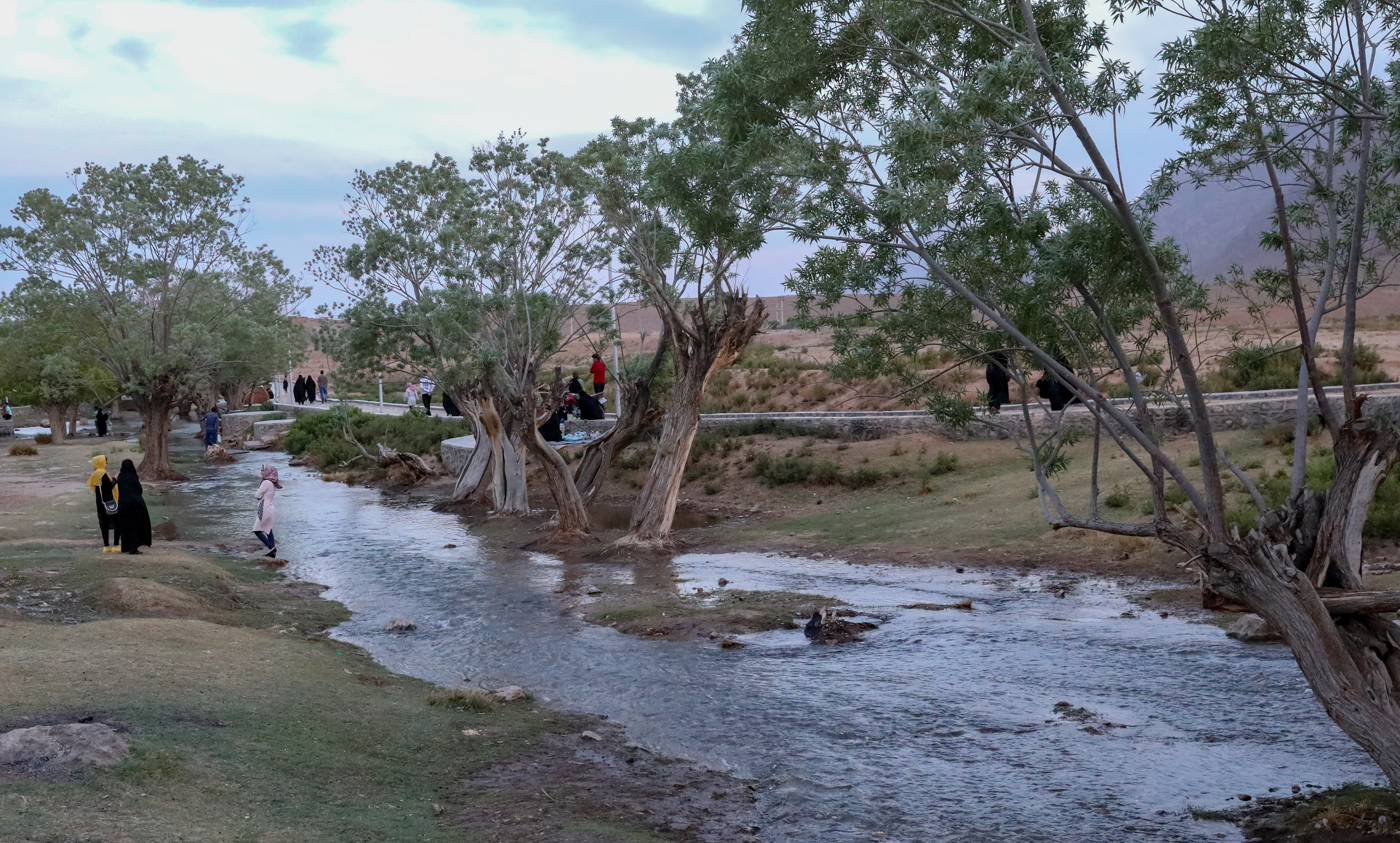
Gharbalbiz spring

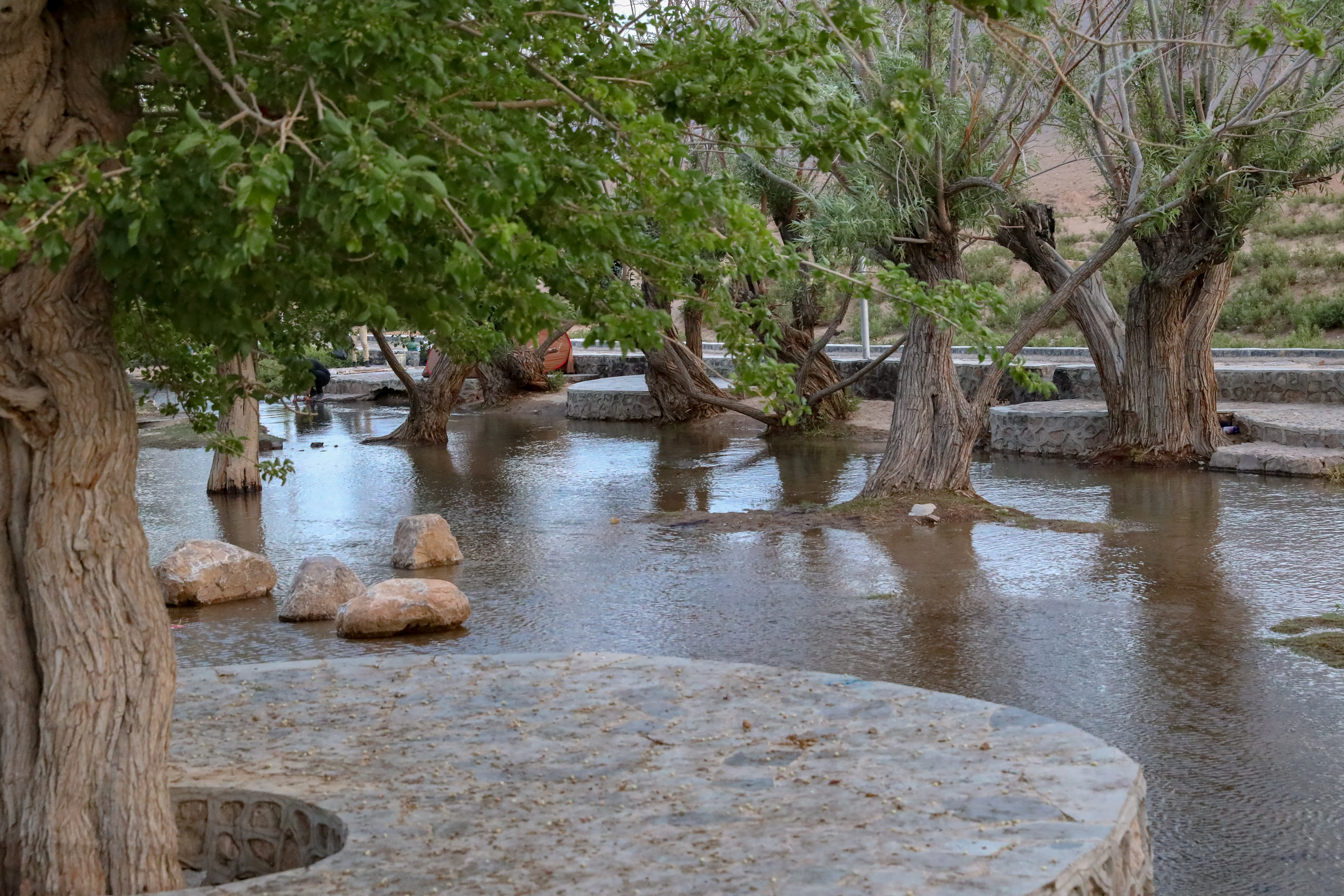
Gharbalbiz spring

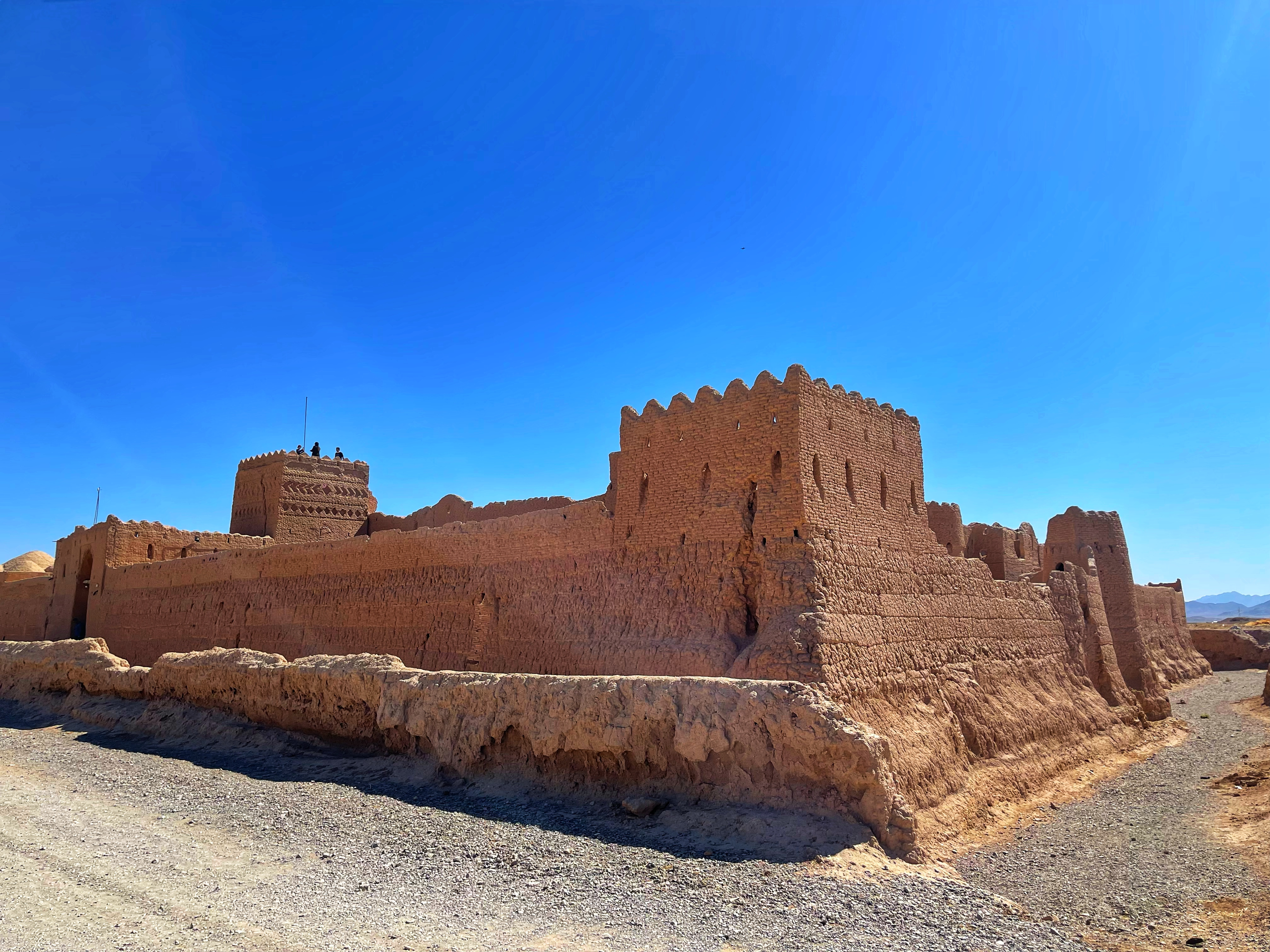
Saryazd Castle

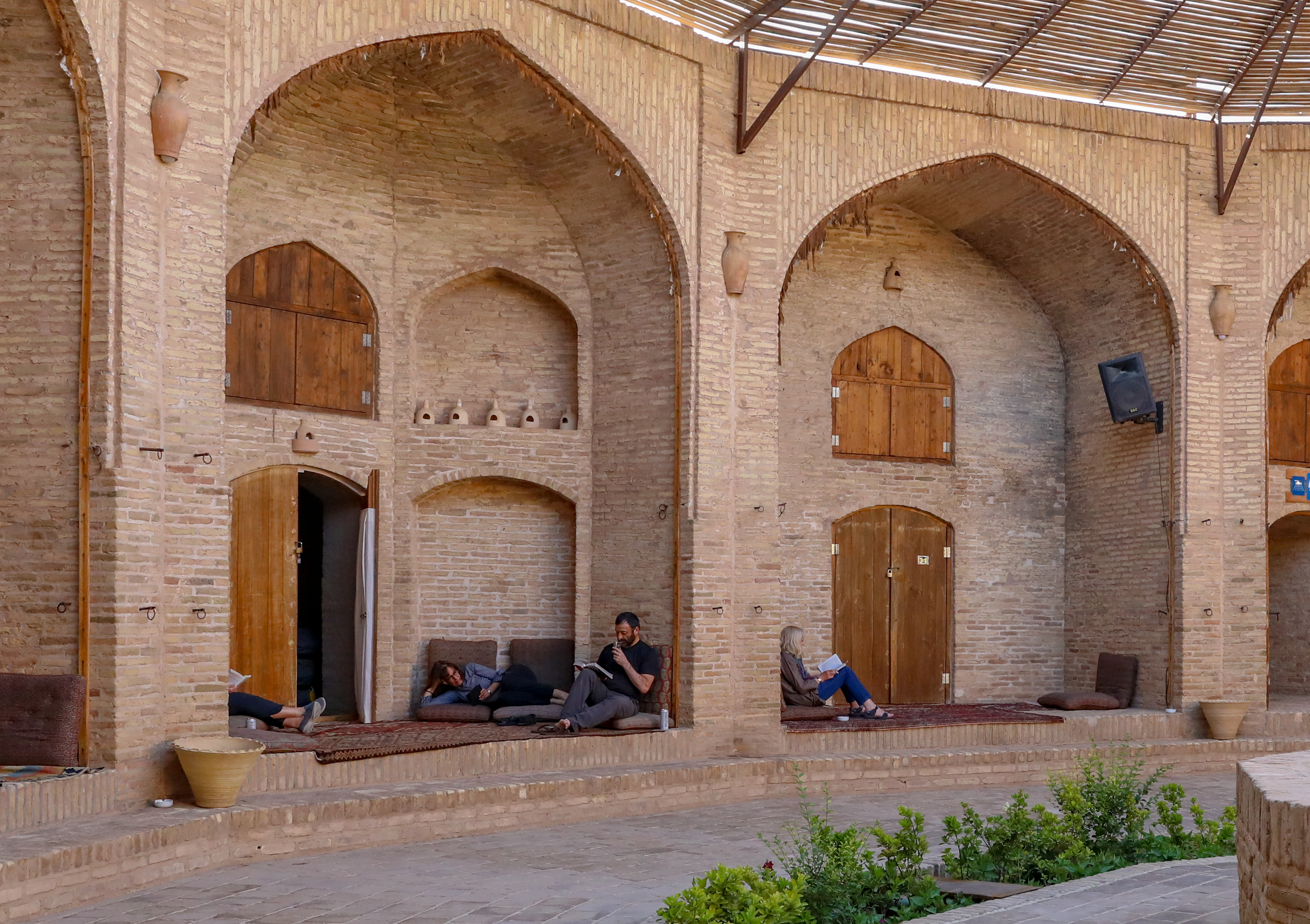
Caravanserai in Mehriz,

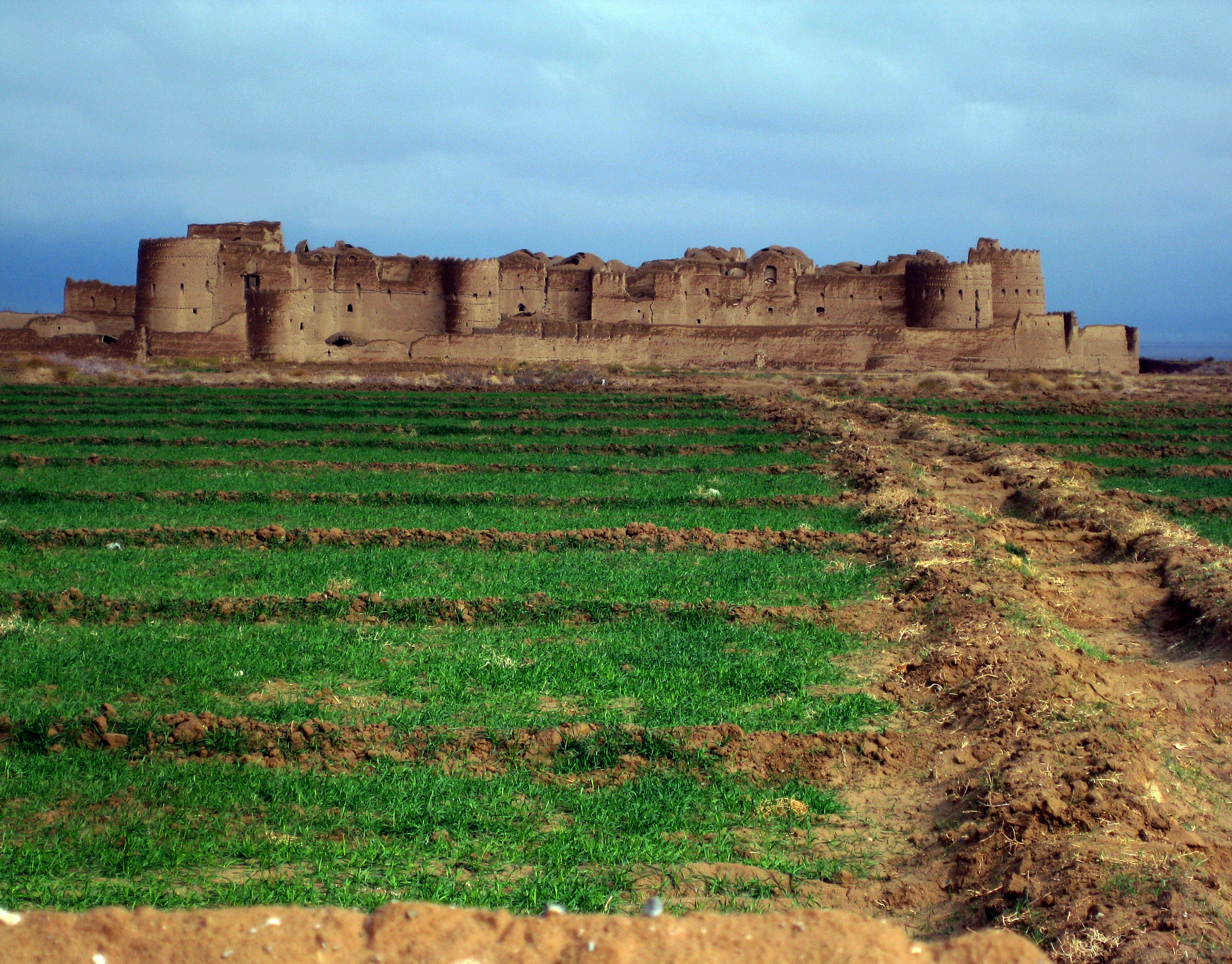
SarYazd Castle

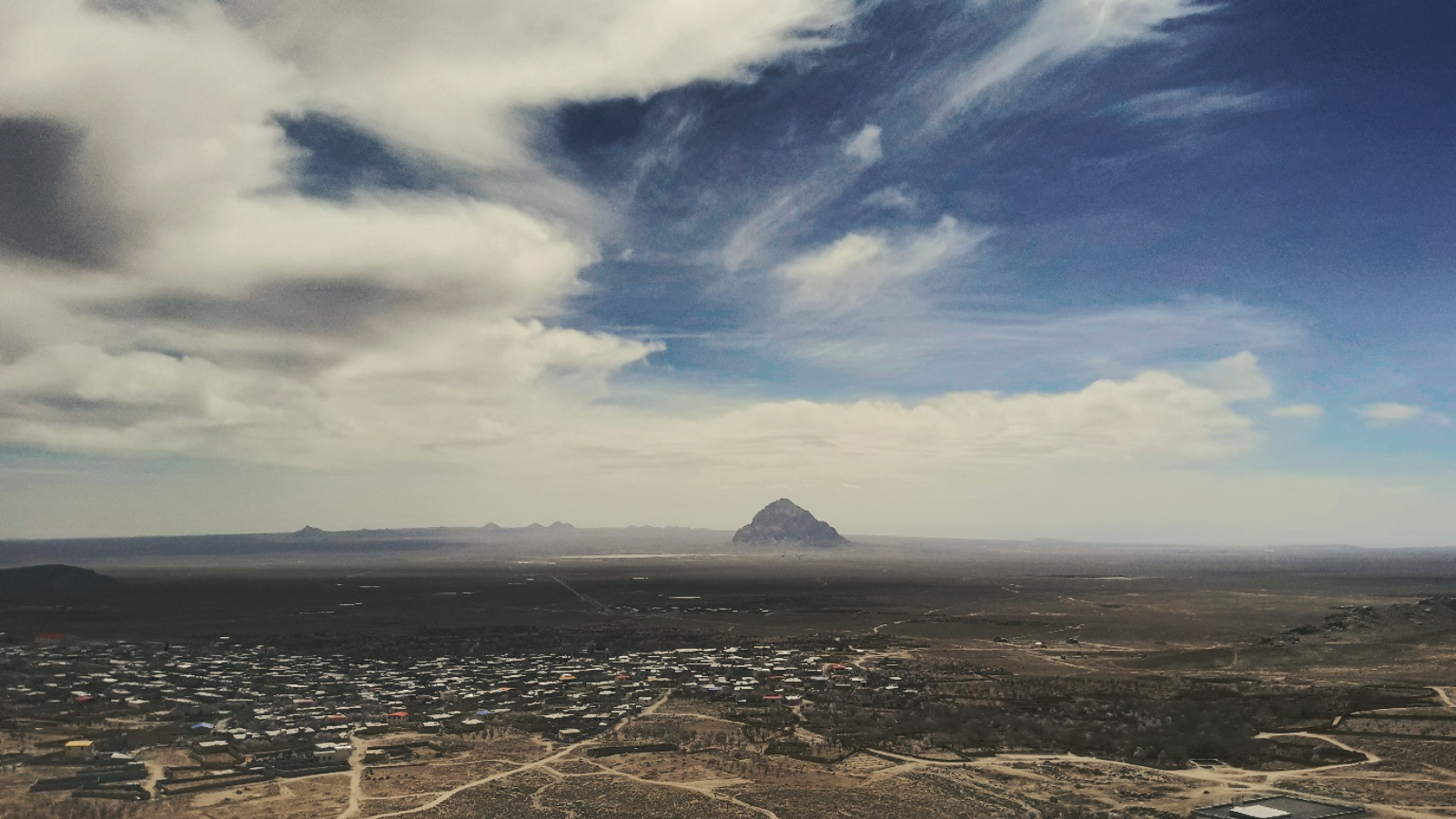
Mount Ernan

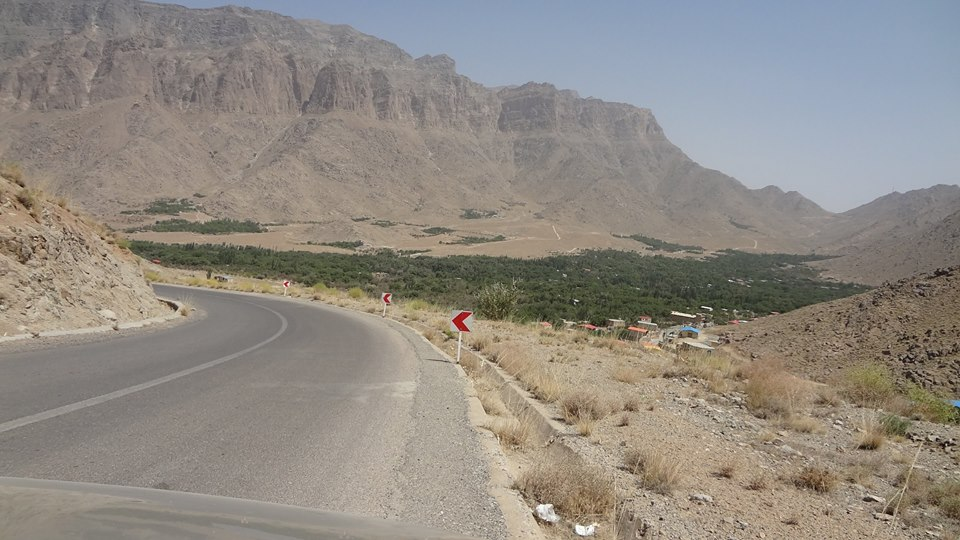
manshad

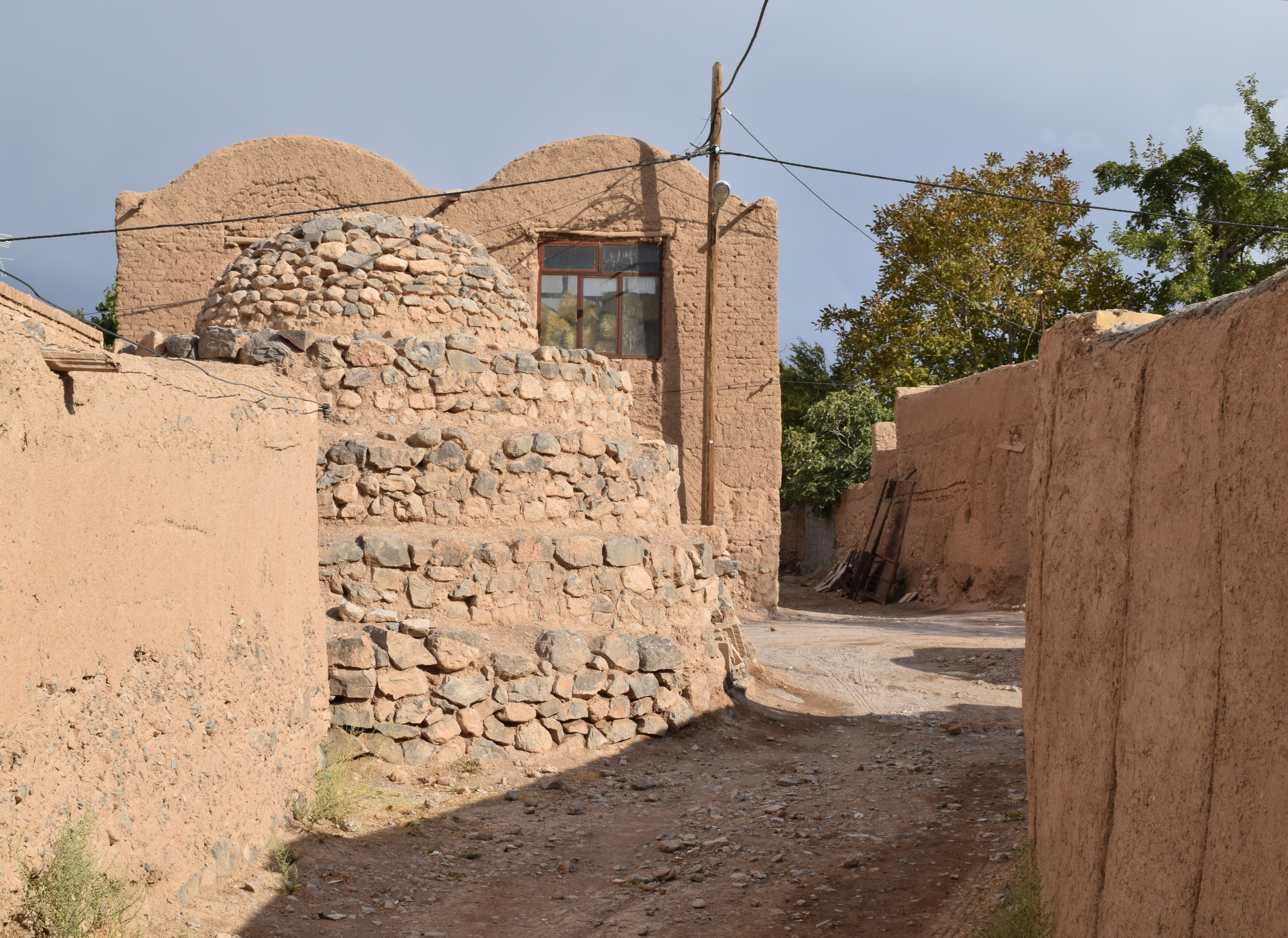
Tezenj Vellage
