= Badamak, Fars =

Badamak بادمك
- Village
- Location within Iran
- Coordinates: 30°15′30″N 52°15′33″E
- Country: Iran
- Province: Fars
- County: Marvdasht
- Bakhsh: Kamfiruz
- Rural District: Khorram Makan

Population (2006)
  - Total: 245
- Time zone: UTC+3:30 (IRST)
  - Summer (DST): UTC+4:30 (IRDT)

Badamak (Persian: بادمك, also Romanized as Bādamak) is a village in Khorram Makan Rural District, Kamfiruz District, Marvdasht County, Fars province, Iran. At the 2006 census, its population was 245, in 47 families.
