= Harzandiq =

Harzandiq هرزنديق
- Village
- Location within Iran
- Coordinates: 38°21′35″N 46°37′16″E
- Country: Iran
- Province: East Azerbaijan
- County: Heris
- Bakhsh: Khvajeh
- Rural District: Mavazekhan-e Shomali

Population (2006)
  - Total: 109
- Time zone: UTC+3:30 (IRST)
  - Summer (DST): UTC+4:30 (IRDT)

Harzandiq (Persian: هرزنديق, also Romanized as Harzandīq; also known as Arzāni, Arzany, and Harzanaq) is a village in Mavazekhan-e Shomali Rural District, Khvajeh District, Heris County, East Azerbaijan Province, Iran. At the 2006 census, its population was 109, in 25 families.
