= Badamak, Kerman =

Badamak بادامک
- Village
- Location within Iran
- Coordinates: 28°09′21″N 58°57′45″E
- Country: Iran
- Province: Kerman
- County: Rigan
- Bakhsh: Central
- Rural District: Gavkan

Population (2006)
  - Total: 158
- Time zone: UTC+3:30 (IRST)
  - Summer (DST): UTC+4:30 (IRDT)

Badamak (Persian: بادامک, also Romanized as Bādāmak; also known as Gowharīyeh (Persian: گوهريه), Gabarhāy and Gowharī) is a village in Gavkan Rural District, in the Central District of Rigan County, Kerman Province, Iran. At the 2006 census, its population was 158, in 25 families.
