= Darreh Garm, Markazi =

Darreh Garm دره گرم
- Village
- Location within Iran
- Coordinates: 33°43′47″N 49°38′28″E
- Country: Iran
- Province: Markazi
- County: Khomeyn
- Bakhsh: Kamareh
- Rural District: Chahar Cheshmeh

Population (2006)
  - Total: 226
- Time zone: UTC+3:30 (IRST)
  - Summer (DST): UTC+4:30 (IRDT)

Darreh Garm (Persian: دره گرم; also known as Darreh) is a village in Chahar Cheshmeh Rural District, Kamareh District, Khomeyn County, Markazi Province, Iran. At the 2006 census, its population was 226, in 42 families.
