= Darreh, Markazi =

Darreh دره
- Village
- Location within Iran
- Coordinates: 33°38′05″N 49°45′30″E
- Country: Iran
- Province: Markazi
- County: Khomeyn
- Bakhsh: Kamareh
- Rural District: Chahar Cheshmeh

Population (2006)
  - Total: 97
- Time zone: UTC+3:30 (IRST)
  - Summer (DST): UTC+4:30 (IRDT)

Darreh (Persian: دره, also Romanized as Derreh; also known as Derāh and Dow Rāh) is a village in Chahar Cheshmeh Rural District, Kamareh District, Khomeyn County, Markazi Province, Iran. At the 2006 census, its population was 97, in 22 families.
