= Bahadoran Rural District =

Rural district in Yazd province, Iran

Bahadoran Rural District Persian: دهستان بهادران
- Rural District
- Location within Iran
- Coordinates: 31°21′44″N 54°53′49″E
- Country: Iran
- Province: Yazd
- County: Mehriz
- District: Central
- Capital: Bahadoran

Population (2016)
  - Total: 4,916
- Time zone: UTC+3:30 (IRST)

Bahadoran Rural District (Persian: دهستان بهادران) is in the Central District of Mehriz County, Yazd province, Iran. Its capital is the village of Bahadoran.

== Demographics ==
=== Population ===
At the time of the 2006 National Census, the rural district's population was 4,327 in 1,111 households. There were 4,124 inhabitants in 1,260 households at the following census of 2011. The 2016 census measured the population of the rural district as 4,916 in 1,461 households. The most populous of its 139 villages was Moradabad, with 1,538 people.
