= Bahadoran, Fars =

Bahadoran بهادران
- Village
- Location within Iran
- Coordinates: 28°40′51″N 54°19′48″E
- Country: Iran
- Province: Fars
- County: Darab
- Bakhsh: Central
- Rural District: Nasrovan

Population (2006)
  - Total: 699
- Time zone: UTC+3:30 (IRST)
  - Summer (DST): UTC+4:30 (IRDT)

Bahadoran (Persian: بهادران, also Romanized as Bahādorān and Bahāderān; also known as Bahādor and Bahādurān) is a village in Nasrovan Rural District, in the Central District of Darab County, Fars province, Iran. At the 2006 census, its population was 699, in 139 families.
