= Badamak, Qazvin =

Badamak بادامك
- Village
- Location within Iran
- Coordinates: 35°48′33″N 49°27′37″E
- Country: Iran
- Province: Qazvin
- County: Takestan
- Bakhsh: Ziaabad
- Rural District: Dodangeh-ye Sofla

Population (2006)
  - Total: 20
- Time zone: UTC+3:30 (IRST)
  - Summer (DST): UTC+4:30 (IRDT)

Badamak (Persian: بادامك, also Romanized as Bādāmak) is a village in Dodangeh-ye Sofla Rural District, Ziaabad District, Takestan County, Qazvin Province, Iran. At the 2006 census, its population was 20, in 4 families.
