= Miankuh Rural District (Mehriz County) =

Rural district in Yazd province, Iran

Miankuh Rural District Persian: دهستان ميانكوه
- Rural District
- Location within Iran
- Coordinates: 31°35′34″N 54°17′41″E
- Country: Iran
- Province: Yazd
- County: Mehriz
- District: Central
- Capital: Banadak Sadat

Population (2016)
  - Total: 1,210
- Time zone: UTC+3:30 (IRST)

Miankuh Rural District (Persian: دهستان ميانكوه) is in the Central District of Mehriz County, Yazd province, Iran. Its capital is the village of Banadak Sadat.

== Demographics ==
=== Population ===
At the time of the 2006 National Census, the rural district's population was 1,518 in 641 households. There were 1,131 inhabitants in 505 households at the following census of 2011. The 2016 census measured the population of the rural district as 1,210 in 565 households. The most populous of its 46 villages was Manshad, with 345 people.
