= Khvormiz Rural District =

Rural district in Yazd province, Iran

Khvormiz Rural District Persian: دهستان خورميز
- Rural District
- Location within Iran
- Coordinates: 31°30′11″N 54°34′39″E
- Country: Iran
- Province: Yazd
- County: Mehriz
- District: Central
- Capital: Mirokabad

Population (2016)
  - Total: 8,215
- Time zone: UTC+3:30 (IRST)

Khvormiz Rural District (Persian: دهستان خورميز) is in the Central District of the Mehriz County in the Yazd province of Iran. Its capital is the village of Mirokabad.

== Demographics ==
=== Population ===
At the time of the 2006 National Census, the rural district's population was 7,784 situated in 2,102 households. There were 7,507 inhabitants in 2,180 households in the following census of 2011. The 2016 census measured the population of the rural district as 8,215 in 2,483 households. The most populous of its 123 villages was Khvormiz-e Olya, with 2,198 people.
