= Tang Chenar Rural District =

Rural district in Yazd province, Iran

Tang Chenar Rural District Persian: دهستان تنگ چنار
- Rural District
- Location within Iran
- Coordinates: 31°23′13″N 54°22′18″E
- Country: Iran
- Province: Yazd
- County: Mehriz
- District: Central
- Capital: Tang Chenar

Population (2016)
  - Total: 1,599
- Time zone: UTC+3:30 (IRST)

Tang Chenar Rural District (Persian: دهستان تنگ چنار) is in the Central District of Mehriz County, Yazd province, Iran. Its capital is the village of Tang Chenar.

== Demographics ==
=== Population ===
At the time of the 2006 National Census, the rural district's population was 1,580 in 479 households. There were 1,499 inhabitants in 509 households at the following census of 2011. The 2016 census measured the population of the rural district as 1,599 in 572 households. The most populous of its 94 villages was Amirabad, with 289 people in 98 households.
