= Ernan Rural District =

Rural district in Yazd province, Iran

Ernan Rural District Persian: دهستان ارنان
- Rural District
- Location within Iran
- Coordinates: 31°11′02″N 54°17′24″E
- Country: Iran
- Province: Yazd
- County: Mehriz
- District: Central
- Capital: Ernan

Population (2016)
  - Total: 1,556
- Time zone: UTC+3:30 (IRST)

Ernan Rural District (Persian: دهستان ارنان) is in the Central District of Mehriz County, Yazd province, Iran. Its capital is the village of Ernan.

== Demographics ==
=== Population ===
At the time of the 2006 National Census, the rural district's population was 1,790 in 568 households. There were 1,382 inhabitants in 490 households at the following census of 2011. The 2016 census measured the population of the rural district as 1,556 in 553 households. The most populous of its 64 villages was Sarv, with 451 people.
