= Central District (Mehriz County) =

District in Yazd province, Iran

Central District (Mehriz County) Persian: بخش مرکزی شهرستان مهریز
- District
- Location within Iran
- Coordinates: 31°22′16″N 54°42′13″E
- Country: Iran
- Province: Yazd
- County: Mehriz
- Capital: Mehriz

Population (2016)
  - Total: 51,733
- Time zone: UTC+3:30 (IRST)

The Central District of Mehriz County (Persian: بخش مرکزی شهرستان مهریز) is in Yazd province, Iran. Its capital is the city of Mehriz.

== Demographics ==
=== Population ===
At the time of the 2006 National Census, the district's population was 43,363 in 11,855 households. The following census in 2011 counted 44,126 people in 13,073 households. The 2016 census measured the population of the district as 51,733 inhabitants in 15,978 households.

=== Administrative divisions ===
Central District (Mehriz County) Population
Administrative Divisions	2006	2011	2016
Bahadoran RD	4,327	4,124	4,916
Ernan RD	1,790	1,382	1,556
Khvormiz RD	7,784	7,507	8,215
Miankuh RD	1,518	1,131	1,210
Tang Chenar RD	1,580	1,499	1,599
Mehriz (city)	26,364	28,483	34,237
Total	43,363	44,126	51,733
RD = Rural District
