= Mehriz County =

County in Yazd province, Iran

Mehriz County Persian: شهرستان مهریز
- County
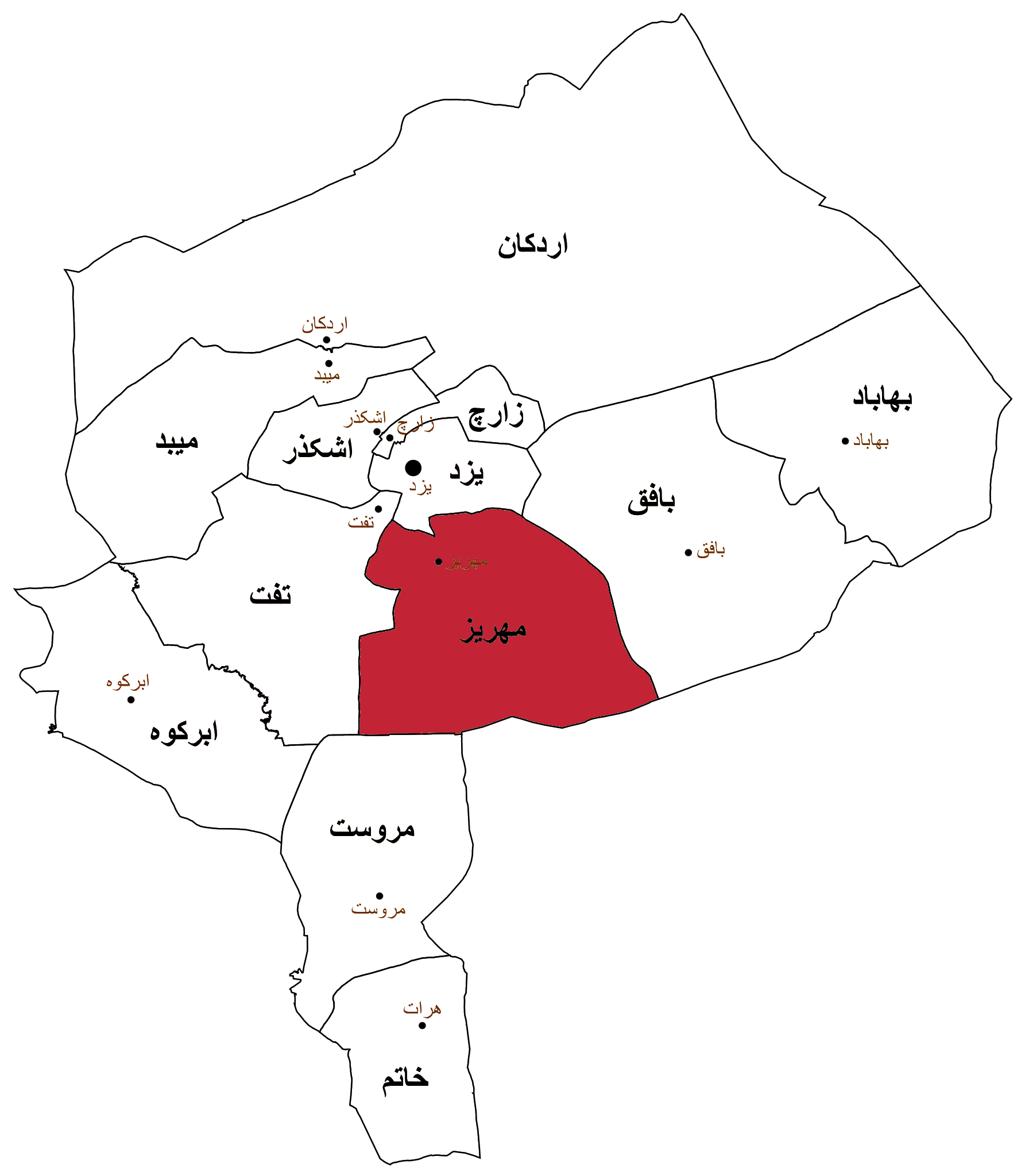
- Location of Mehriz County in Yazd province

- Location of Yazd province in Iran
- Coordinates: 31°22′N 54°41′E
- Country: Iran
- Province: Yazd
- Capital: Mehriz
- Districts: Central

Population (2016)
  - Total: 51,733
- Time zone: UTC+3:30 (IRST)

Mehriz County (Persian: شهرستان مهریز) is in Yazd province, Iran. Its capital is the city of Mehriz.

== Demographics ==
=== Population ===
At the time of the 2006 National Census, the county's population was 43,363 in 11,855 households. The following census in 2011 counted 44,126 people in 13,073 households. The 2016 census measured the population of the county as 51,733 in 15,978 households.

=== Administrative divisions ===
Mehriz County's population history and administrative structure over three consecutive censuses are shown in the following table.

Mehriz County Population
Administrative Divisions	2006	2011	2016
Central District	43,363	44,126	51,733
Bahadoran RD	4,327	4,124	4,916
Ernan RD	1,790	1,382	1,556
Khvormiz RD	7,784	7,507	8,215
Miankuh RD	1,518	1,131	1,210
Tang Chenar RD	1,580	1,499	1,599
Mehriz (city)	26,364	28,483	34,237
Total	43,363	44,126	51,733
RD = Rural District

== See also ==
Media related to Mehriz County at Wikimedia Commons
