= Mehrabad =

Mehrabad often refers to Mehrabad International Airport, which serves Tehran, Iran.

Mehrabad or Mahrabad (Persian: مهرآباد) may also refer to:

== East Azerbaijan Province ==
- Mehrabad, East Azerbaijan, a village in Ajab Shir County

== Fars Province ==
- Mehrabad, Darab, a village in Darab County
- Mehrabad, Fasarud, a village in Darab County
- Mehrabad, Kharameh, a village in Kharameh County
- Mehrabad, Lamerd, a village in Lamerd County
- Mehrabad, Larestan, a village in Larestan County
- Mehrabad, Juyom, a village in Larestan County
- Mehrabad, Mamasani, a village in Mamasani County
- Mehrabad, Pasargad, a village in Pasargad County

== Hamadan Province ==
- Mehrabad, Hamadan, a village in Malayer County

== Isfahan Province ==
- Mehrabad, Ardestan, a village in Ardestan County
- Mehrabad, Zavareh, a village in Ardestan County
- Mehrabad, Khvansar, a village in Khvansar County
- Mehrabad, Kuhestan, a village in Nain County
- Mehrabad, Lay Siyah, a village in Nain County
- Mehrabad, Semirom, a village in Semirom County

== Kerman Province ==
- Mehrabad, Anar, a village in Anar County
- Mehrabad, Bam, a village in Bam County
- Mehrabad, Rafsanjan, a village in Rafsanjan County
- Mehrabad, Shahr-e Babak, a village in Shahr-e Babak County

== Khuzestan Province ==
- Mehrabad, Ramshir, a village in Ramshir County

== Kohgiluyeh and Boyer-Ahmad Province ==
- Mehrabad, Kohgiluyeh and Boyer-Ahmad, a village in Kohgiluyeh County

== Kurdistan Province ==
- Mehrabad, Kurdistan, a village in Bijar County

== Lorestan Province ==
- Mehrabad-e Tudehrud, a village in Lorestan Province, Iran

== Markazi Province ==
- Mehrabad, Arak, a village in Arak County
- Mehrabad, Khomeyn, a village in Khomeyn County

== Mazandaran Province ==
- Mehrabad, Mazandaran, a village in Juybar County

== North Khorasan Province ==
- Mehrabad, North Khorasan

== Razavi Khorasan Province ==
- Mehrabad, Chenaran, a village in Chenaran County
- Mehrabad, Davarzan, a village in Davarzan County
- Mehrabad, Jowayin, a village in Jowayin County
- Mehrabad, Mashhad, a village in Mashhad County
- Mehrabad-e Shor Shor, a village in Mashhad County
- Mehrabad, Mazul, a village in Nishapur County
- Mehrabad, Rivand, a village in Nishapur County

== South Khorasan Province ==
- Mehrabad, Khusf, a village in Khusf County
- Mehrabad, Tabas, a village in Tabas County

== Tehran Province ==
- Mehrabad, Tehran
- Mehrabad Rural District (Tehran Province)

== Yazd Province ==
- Mehrdasht, a city in Abarkuh County
- Mehrabad Rural District (Yazd Province), in Abarkuh County
- Mehrabad, Meybod, a village in Meybod County
- Mehrabad-e Pain, a village in Meybod County

== Zanjan Province ==
- Mehrabad, Zanjan, a village in Zanjan County

== See also ==
- Mihrabad (disambiguation)
