= Dareyn, Yazd =

Village in Yazd province, Iran

Dareyn Persian: درين
- Village
- Location within Iran
- Coordinates: 32°15′12″N 53°38′32″E
- Country: Iran
- Province: Yazd
- County: Meybod
- District: Bafruiyeh
- Rural District: Dareyn

Population (2016)
  - Total: 150
- Time zone: UTC+3:30 (IRST)

Dareyn (Persian: درين) (Note: Also romanized as Darin, Darīn and Dārīn; formerly Surk (سورک)) is a village in, and the capital of, Dareyn Rural District (Note: Formerly Surk Rural District) of Bafruiyeh District of Meybod County, Yazd province, Iran.

== Demographics ==
=== Population ===
At the time of the 2006 National Census, the village's population was 127 in 36 households, when it was in Bafruiyeh Rural District of the Central District. The following census in 2011 counted 169 people in 51 households. The 2016 census measured the population of the village as 150 people in 45 households, by which time the rural district had been separated from the district in the establishment of Bafruiyeh District. Dareyn was transferred to Surk Rural District (Note: Renamed Dareyn Rural District) created in the new district.
