= Jahanabad, Meybod =

Jahanabad جهان اباد
- Village
- Location within Iran
- Coordinates: 32°09′58″N 54°04′27″E
- Country: Iran
- Province: Yazd
- County: Meybod
- Bakhsh: Central
- Rural District: Shohada

Population (2006)
  - Total: 90
- Time zone: UTC+3:30 (IRST)
  - Summer (DST): UTC+4:30 (IRDT)

Jahanabad (Persian: جهان اباد, also Romanized as Jahānābād) is a village in Shohada Rural District, in the Central District of Meybod County, Yazd Province, Iran. At the 2006 census, its population was 90, in 27 families.
