= Ab Shureh-ye Ashniz-e Bala =

Ab Shureh-ye Ashniz-e Bala ابشوره اشنيزبالا
- Village
- Location within Iran
- Coordinates: 32°05′23″N 53°49′43″E
- Country: Iran
- Province: Yazd
- County: Meybod
- Bakhsh: Central
- Rural District: Bafruiyeh

Population (2006)
  - Total: 36
- Time zone: UTC+3:30 (IRST)
  - Summer (DST): UTC+4:30 (IRDT)

Ab Shureh-ye Ashniz-e Bala (Persian: ابشوره اشنيزبالا, also Romanized as Āb Shūreh-ye Āshnīz-e Bālā; also known as Āb Shūreh) is a village in Bafruiyeh Rural District, in the Central District of Meybod County, Yazd province, Iran. At the 2006 census, its population was 36, in 10 families.
