= Ashniz-e Bala =

Ashniz-e Bala اشنيزبالا
- Village
- Location within Iran
- Coordinates: 32°05′11″N 53°49′19″E
- Country: Iran
- Province: Yazd
- County: Meybod
- Bakhsh: Central
- Rural District: Bafruiyeh

Population (2006)
  - Total: 52
- Time zone: UTC+3:30 (IRST)
  - Summer (DST): UTC+4:30 (IRDT)

Ashniz-e Bala (Persian: اشنيزبالا, also Romanized as Ashnīz-e Bālā; also known as Ashnīz) is a village in Bafruiyeh Rural District, in the Central District of Meybod County, Yazd Province, Iran. At the 2006 census, its population was 52, in 15 families.
