= Seyyedabad, Meybod =

Seyyedabad سيداباد
- Village
- Location within Iran
- Coordinates: 32°12′22″N 53°44′47″E
- Country: Iran
- Province: Yazd
- County: Meybod
- Bakhsh: Central
- Rural District: Bafruiyeh

Population (2006)
  - Total: 12
- Time zone: UTC+3:30 (IRST)
  - Summer (DST): UTC+4:30 (IRDT)

Seyyedabad (Persian: سيداباد, also Romanized as Seyyedābād; also known as Şeydābād) is a village in Bafruiyeh Rural District, in the Central District of Meybod County, Yazd Province, Iran. At the 2006 census, its population was 12, in 4 families.
