= Mohammadabad, Meybod =

Mohammadabad محمداباد
- Village
- Location within Iran
- Coordinates: 32°08′56″N 54°04′24″E
- Country: Iran
- Province: Yazd
- County: Meybod
- Bakhsh: Central
- Rural District: Shohada

Population (2006)
  - Total: 214
- Time zone: UTC+3:30 (IRST)
  - Summer (DST): UTC+4:30 (IRDT)

Mohammadabad (Persian: محمداباد, also Romanized as Moḩammadābād; also known as Muhammadābād) is a village in Shohada Rural District, in the Central District of Meybod County, Yazd Province, Iran. At the 2006 census, its population was 214, in 72 families.
