= Naryn Castle =

Naryn Castle may refer to the following castles in Iran:

- Naryn Castle, Ardabil
- Naryn Castle, Nain
- Naryn Castle, Meybod
- Naryn Castle, Sardrud
- Mehrjerd Castle or Naryn Castle, Meybod
