= Roknabad, Yazd =

Village in Yazd province, Iran

Roknabad رکن‌آباد
- Village
- Location within Iran
- Coordinates: 32°11′37″N 54°03′17″E
- Country: Iran
- Province: Yazd
- County: Meybod
- District: Central
- Rural District: Shohada

Population (2016)
  - Total: 2,324
- Time zone: UTC+3:30 (IRST)

Roknabad (Persian: رکن‌آباد) (Note: Also romanized as Roknābād; also known as Ruenābād and Ruknābād) is a village in, and the capital of, Shohada Rural District (Note: Formerly Shahidiyeh Rural District) of the Central District of Meybod County, Yazd province, Iran. The previous capital of the rural district was the village of Shahidiyeh, now a neighborhood of the city of Meybod.

== Demographics ==
=== Population ===
At the time of the 2006 National Census, the village's population was 1,894 in 506 households. The following census in 2011 counted 2,579 people in 726 households. The 2016 census measured the population of the village as 2,324 people in 698 households. It was the most populous village in its rural district.
