= Anjireh, Yazd =

Anjireh انجيره
- Village
- Location within Iran
- Coordinates: 32°09′14″N 54°28′38″E
- Country: Iran
- Province: Yazd
- County: Meybod
- Bakhsh: Central
- Rural District: Bafruiyeh

Population (2006)
  - Total: 11
- Time zone: UTC+3:30 (IRST)
  - Summer (DST): UTC+4:30 (IRDT)

Anjireh (Persian: انجيره, also Romanized as Anjīreh; also known as Anjīrak, Anjīreh-ye Now, and Anjīrvand) is a village in Bafruiyeh Rural District, in the Central District of Meybod County, Yazd Province, Iran. At the 2006 census, its population was 11, in 5 families.
