= Dareyn Rural District =

Rural district in Yazd province, Iran

Dareyn Rural District Persian: دهستان درین
- Rural District
- Location within Iran
- Coordinates: 32°14′05″N 53°43′18″E
- Country: Iran
- Province: Yazd
- County: Meybod
- District: Bafruiyeh
- Capital: Dareyn

Population (2016)
  - Total: 701
- Time zone: UTC+3:30 (IRST)

Dareyn Rural District (Persian: دهستان درین) (Note: Formerly Surk Rural District (دهستان سورک)) is in Bafruiyeh District of Meybod County, Yazd province, Iran. Its capital is the village of Dareyn. (Note: Formerly the village of Surk)

== History ==
After the 2011 National Census, Bafruiyeh Rural District and the city of Bafruiyeh were separated from the Central District in the formation of Bafruiyeh District, and Surk Rural District (Note: Renamed Dareyn Rural District) was created in the new district.

== Demographics ==
=== Population ===
At the time of the 2016 census, the rural district's population was 701 in 240 households. The most populous of its 50 villages was Hafthar, with 256 people.
