= Musaabad, Yazd =

Musaabad موسي اباد
- Village
- Location within Iran
- Coordinates: 32°14′01″N 54°03′02″E
- Country: Iran
- Province: Yazd
- County: Meybod
- Bakhsh: Central
- Rural District: Shohada

Population (2006)
  - Total: 44
- Time zone: UTC+3:30 (IRST)
  - Summer (DST): UTC+4:30 (IRDT)

Musaabad (Persian: موسي اباد, also Romanized as Mūsáābād; also known as Mūsīābād) is a village in Shohada Rural District, in the Central District of Meybod County, Yazd Province, Iran. At the 2006 census, its population was 44, in 14 families.
