= Hojjatabad-e Sofla, Yazd =

Hojjatabad-e Sofla حجت‌آباد سفلی
- Village
- Country: Iran
- Province: Yazd
- County: Meybod
- Bakhsh: Central
- Rural District: Shohada

Population (2006)
  - Total: 497
- Time zone: UTC+3:30 (IRST)
  - Summer (DST): UTC+4:30 (IRDT)

Hojjatabad-e Sofla (Persian: حجت‌آباد سفلی, also Romanized as Ḩojjatābād-e Soflá) is a village in Shohada Rural District, in the Central District of Meybod County, Yazd Province, Iran. At the 2006 census, its population was 497, in 141 families.
