= Hojjatabad-e Sofla =

Hojjatabad-e Sofla (Persian: حجتابادسفلي) may refer to:

- Hojjatabad-e Sofla, Kermanshah
- Hojjatabad-e Sofla, Yazd
