= Hudar, Yazd =

Hudar هودر
- Village
- Location within Iran
- Coordinates: 32°14′32″N 53°37′09″E
- Country: Iran
- Province: Yazd
- County: Meybod
- Bakhsh: Central
- Rural District: Bafruiyeh

Population (2006)
  - Total: 12
- Time zone: UTC+3:30 (IRST)
  - Summer (DST): UTC+4:30 (IRDT)

Hudar (Persian: هودر, also Romanized as Hūdar; also known as Howdeh and Hūdeh) is a village in Bafruiyeh Rural District, in the Central District of Meybod County, Yazd Province, Iran. At the 2006 census, its population was 12, in 4 families.
