= Badrabad, Yazd =

Badrabad بدراباد
- Village
- Location within Iran
- Coordinates: 32°13′11″N 54°01′58″E
- Country: Iran
- Province: Yazd
- County: Meybod
- Bakhsh: Central
- Rural District: Shohada

Population (2006)
  - Total: 43
- Time zone: UTC+3:30 (IRST)
  - Summer (DST): UTC+4:30 (IRDT)

Badrabad (Persian: بدراباد, also Romanized as Badrābād and Badarābād; also known as Mehrābād-e Pā’īn) is a village in Shohada Rural District, in the Central District of Meybod County, Yazd Province, Iran. At the 2006 census, its population was 43, in 12 families.
