= Hafthar =

Village in Yazd province, Iran

Hafthar Persian: هفت هر
- Village
- Location within Iran
- Coordinates: 32°16′52″N 53°29′31″E
- Country: Iran
- Province: Yazd
- County: Meybod
- District: Bafruiyeh
- Rural District: Dareyn

Population (2016)
  - Total: 256
- Time zone: UTC+3:30 (IRST)

Hafthar (Persian: هفت هر) (Note: Also romanized as Haft Har; also known as Haftdar and Hūnū Marvar) is a village in Dareyn Rural District (Note: Formerly Surk Rural District) of Bafruiyeh District, Meybod County, Yazd province, Iran.

== Demographics ==
=== Population ===
At the time of the 2006 National Census, the village's population was 288 in 107 households, when it was in Nadushan Rural District of Khezrabad District, Ashkezar County. The following census in 2011 counted 318 people in 111 households. The 2016 census measured the population of the village as 256 people in 99 households, by which time the rural district had been separated from the county in the establishment of Nadushan District in Meybod County. Hafthar was transferred to Dareyn Rural District of the new Bafruiyeh District. It was the most populous village in its rural district.
