= Hudeh =

Hudeh or Howdeh (Persian: هوده) may refer to:

- Hudeh, Gilan
- Hudeh, Yazd
