= Mehrabad-e Bala =

Mehrabad-e Bala (Persian: مهرابادبالا) may refer to:

- Mehrabad-e Bala, Fars
- Mehrabad-e Bala, Yazd
