= Sefid Castle, Nadushan =

Castle in Yazd Province, Iran

Sefid castle
- قلعه سفید
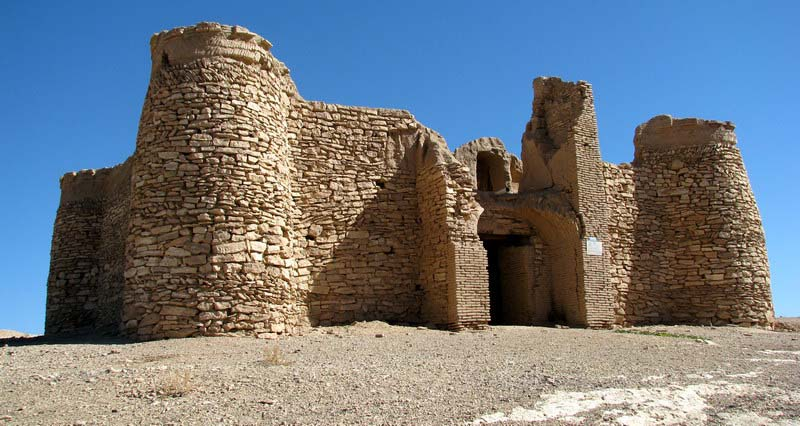
- Interactive map of the Sefid castle area

General information
- Type: Castle
- Location: Meybod County, Iran
- Coordinates: 32°01′44″N 53°33′11″E

Sefid castle (Persian: قلعه سفید) is a historical castle located in Meybod County in Yazd Province, It was first established during either the Afsharid dynasty or Zand dynasty.
