= Mihrabad =

Mihrabad (Persian: ميهراباد) may refer to:

- Mihrabad, Hamadan
- Mihrabad, Isfahan
- Mihrabad, Khvaf, Razavi Khorsaan Province
- Mihrabad, Sabzevar, Razavi Khorsaan Province
- Mihrabad, Yazd
- Mihrabat Nature Park, a protected area at Kanlıca neighborhood of Beykoz, Istanbul in Turkey

== See also ==
- Mehrabad (disambiguation)
