= Mehrabad, Meybod =

Mehrabad مهراباد
- Village
- Location within Iran
- Coordinates: 32°12′19″N 54°02′55″E
- Country: Iran
- Province: Yazd
- County: Meybod
- Bakhsh: Central
- Rural District: Shohada

Population (2006)
  - Total: 821
- Time zone: UTC+3:30 (IRST)
  - Summer (DST): UTC+4:30 (IRDT)

Mehrabad (Persian: مهراباد, also Romanized as Mehrābād; also known as Mehrābād-e Bālā and Mehr Abad Meibod) is a village in Shohada Rural District, in the Central District of Meybod County, Yazd Province, Iran. At the 2006 census, its population was 821, in 207 families.
