= Venin =

Venin is the French word for venom, the toxic substance found in venomous animals. It may also refer to:

- Antivenin, a biological product used in the treatment of venomous bites or stings
- Venin, Iran, a village in Isfahan Province, Iran
- Crache Ton Venin, the second album by French rock band Téléphone, released in 1979
