= Kachu Rural District =

Rural district in Isfahan province, Iran

Kachu Rural District Persian: دهستان كچو
- Rural District
- Location within Iran
- Coordinates: 33°15′N 52°34′E
- Country: Iran
- Province: Isfahan
- County: Ardestan
- District: Central
- Established: 1987
- Capital: Kachumesqal

Population (2016)
  - Total: 1,483
- Time zone: UTC+3:30 (IRST)

Kachu Rural District (Persian: دهستان كچو) is in the Central District of Ardestan County, Isfahan province, Iran. Its capital is the village of Kachumesqal.

== Demographics ==
=== Population ===
At the time of the 2006 National Census, the rural district's population was 1,771 in 618 households. There were 1,295 inhabitants in 518 households at the following census of 2011. The 2016 census measured the population of the rural district as 1,483 in 612 households. The most populous of its 27 villages was Kachumesqal, with 487 people.

=== Other villages in the rural district ===
- Henduabad
- Mehrabad
- Panj
- Sarabeh
- Venin
- Zafarqand
