= Henduabad =

Village in Isfahan province, Iran

Henduabad Persian: هندواباد
- Village
- Location within Iran
- Coordinates: 33°18′18″N 52°25′29″E
- Country: Iran
- Province: Isfahan
- County: Ardestan
- District: Central
- Rural District: Kachu

Population (2016)
  - Total: 343
- Time zone: UTC+3:30 (IRST)

Henduabad (Persian: هندواباد) (Note: Also romanized as Hendūābād) is a village in Kachu Rural District of the Central District in Ardestan County, Isfahan province, Iran.

== Demographics ==
=== Population ===
At the time of the 2006 National Census, the village's population was 437 in 121 households. The following census in 2011 counted 414 people in 123 households. The 2016 census measured the population of the village as 343 people in 116 households.
