= Zafarqand =

Village in Isfahan province, Iran

Zafarqand Persian: ظفرقند
- Village
- Location within Iran
- Coordinates: 33°10′38″N 52°28′48″E
- Country: Iran
- Province: Isfahan
- County: Ardestan
- District: Central
- Rural District: Kachu

Population (2016)
  - Total: 124
- Time zone: UTC+3:30 (IRST)

Zafarqand (Persian: ظفرقند) (Note: Also romanized as Z̧afarqand; also known as Jaukand, Jūqand, and Zafarghand) is a village in Kachu Rural District of the Central District in Ardestan County, Isfahan province, Iran.

== Demographics ==
=== Language ===
Zafarqand is Persian-speaking.

=== Population ===
At the time of the 2006 National Census, the village's population was 229 in 95 households. The following census in 2011 counted 153 people in 75 households. The 2016 census measured the population of the village as 124 people in 66 households.

== Notable people ==
Yousef Tabatabai Nejad, Shia cleric and politician
