= Panj, Iran =

Village in Isfahan province, Iran

Panj Persian: پنج
- Village
- Location within Iran
- Coordinates: 33°11′07″N 52°32′20″E
- Country: Iran
- Province: Isfahan
- County: Ardestan
- District: Central
- Rural District: Kachu

Population (2016)
  - Total: 33
- Time zone: UTC+3:30 (IRST)

Panj (Persian: پنج) is a village in Kachu Rural District of the Central District in Ardestan County, Isfahan province, Iran.

== Demographics ==
=== Population ===
At the time of the 2006 National Census, the village's population was 40 in 21 households. The following census in 2011 counted 18 people in 10 households. The 2016 census measured the population of the village as 33 people in 16 households.
