= Kachumesqal =

Village in Isfahan province, Iran

Kachumesqal Persian: كچومثقال
- Village
- Location within Iran
- Coordinates: 33°17′49″N 52°26′42″E
- Country: Iran
- Province: Isfahan
- County: Ardestan
- District: Central
- Rural District: Kachu

Population (2016)
  - Total: 487
- Time zone: UTC+3:30 (IRST)

Kachumesqal (Persian: كچومثقال) (Note: Also romanized as Kachūmes̄qāl) is a village in, and the capital of, Kachu Rural District in the Central District of Ardestan County, Isfahan province, Iran.

== Demographics ==
=== Population ===
At the time of the 2006 National Census, the village's population was 332 in 118 households. The following census in 2011 counted 260 people in 116 households. The 2016 census measured the population of the village as 487 people in 193 households, the most populous in its rural district.
