= Naryn Castle, Meybod =

Castle in Meybod, Iran

Coordinates: 32.2261°N 54.0145°E

Naryn Castle
- نارین‌ قلعه
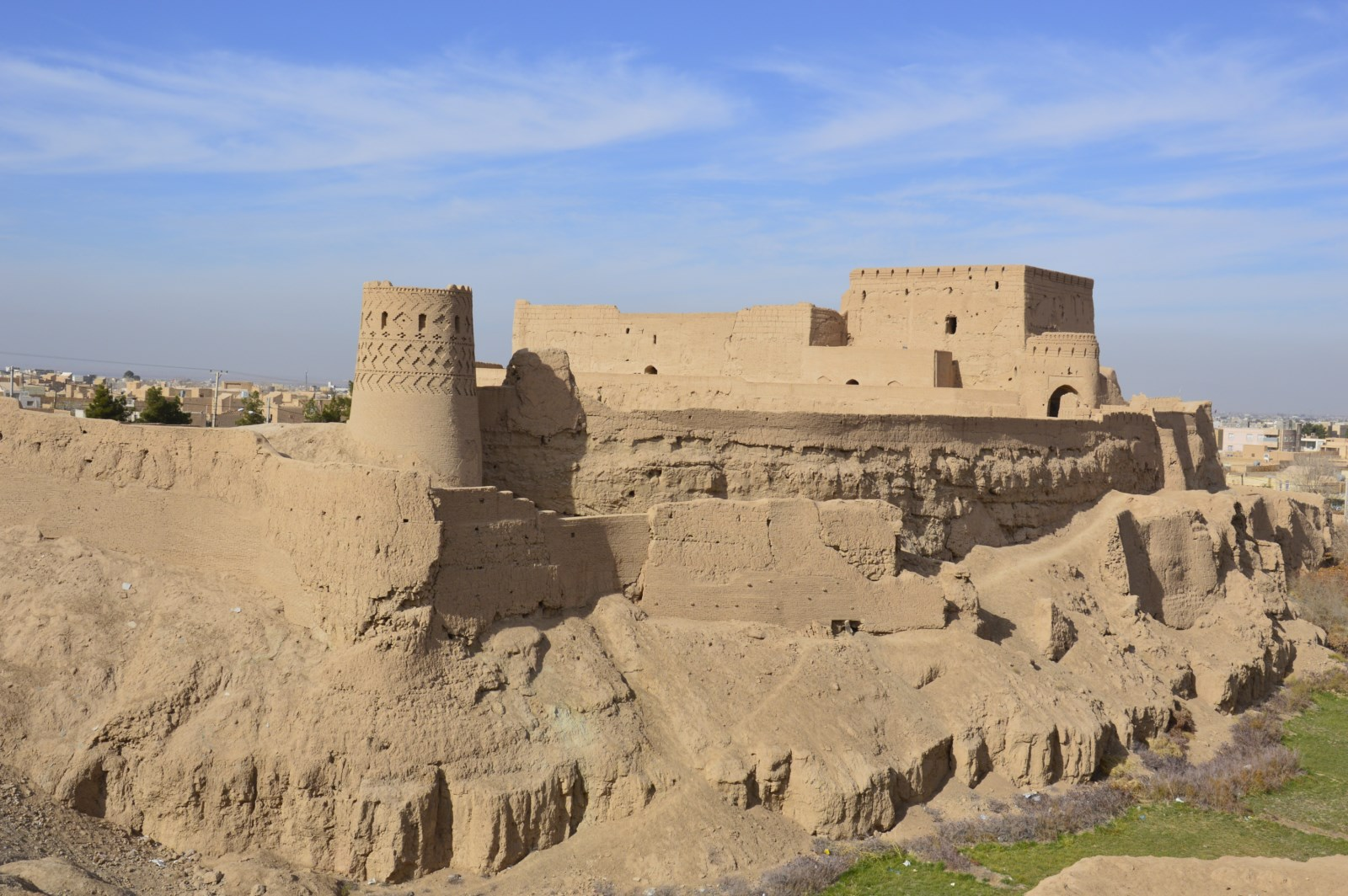

General information
- Type: Castle
- Architectural style: Iranian architecture
- Location: Meybod, Iran

The Naryn Castle (Persian: نارین قلعه) also Narin Castle, Narin Qal'eh, Narenj Castle or Mehrjerd Castle, is a mud-adobe fort or castle in the town of Meybod, Iran. Built some 2,000 to 6,000 years ago, it has four towers and stands 40 meters (130 ft) high and contained a plumbing system.

== Architecture ==
The ruins of the structure stands 40 meters (130 ft) high from its base. Although built between 2,000 and 6,000 years ago, it contains what seems to be a type of plumbing system (made out of a kind of mortar called sarooj) which was built into its massive walls. Peculiarly similar in design to Ali Qapu palace in Isfahan, it has a terrace high on top of the structure whose circulation is provided by two helical stairwells (whose walls have caved in, making it inaccessible). The structure also has a large underground chamber (now filled by rubble), was possibly used as a prison. Four towers surround the entire compound, and a large gate furnishes access to a large courtyard.

This building has been built as an old fortress with three different floors, each for a different class of society.

Structures like Naryn Castle constituted the government stronghold in some of the older (pre-Islamic) towns of central Iran. Some of these castles incorporate mud bricks of the Median era and of the Achaemenid and Sasanian eras.

Some believe that the Narin castles are descendants of ancient Zoroastrian fire-temples; some of the castles in Narin and Meybod, in Yazd province, are also called nareng castles (orange castles), possibly by folk etymology.

== Current conditions ==
The castle at Meybod is currently under study but has not been faring very well. The structure seems to have been affected by numerous earthquakes throughout the ages.

== Gallery ==
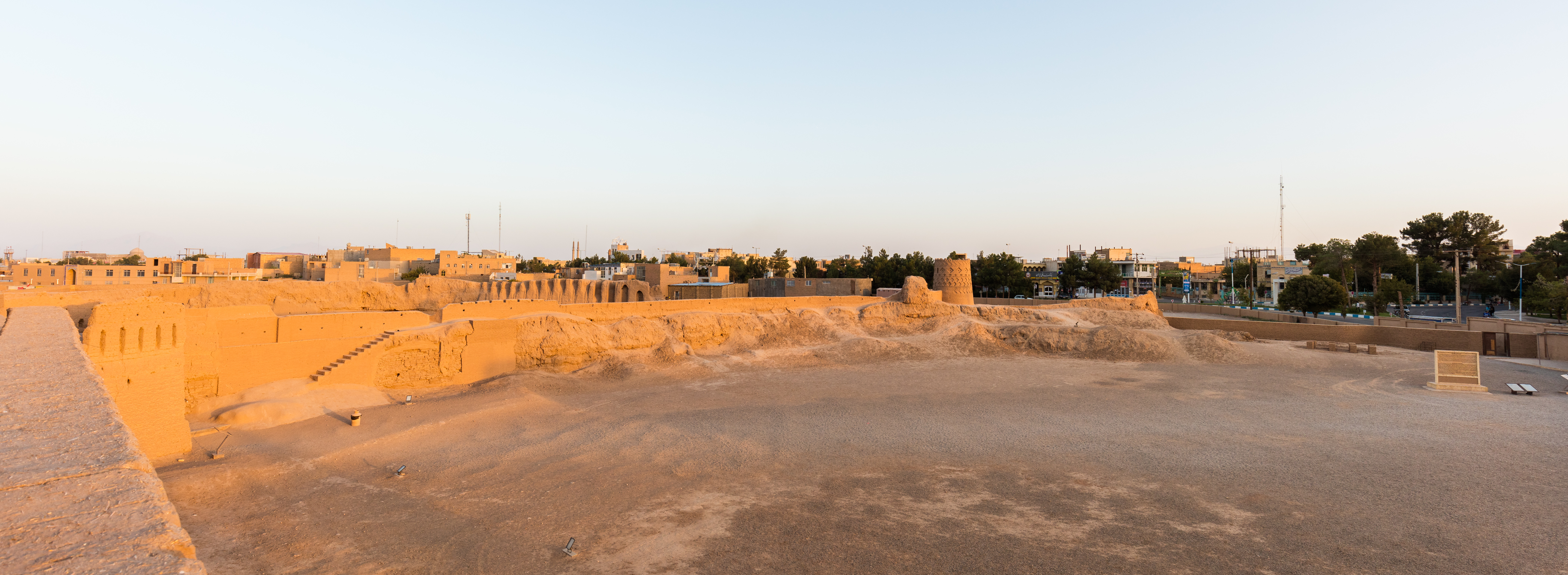
View of the yard.

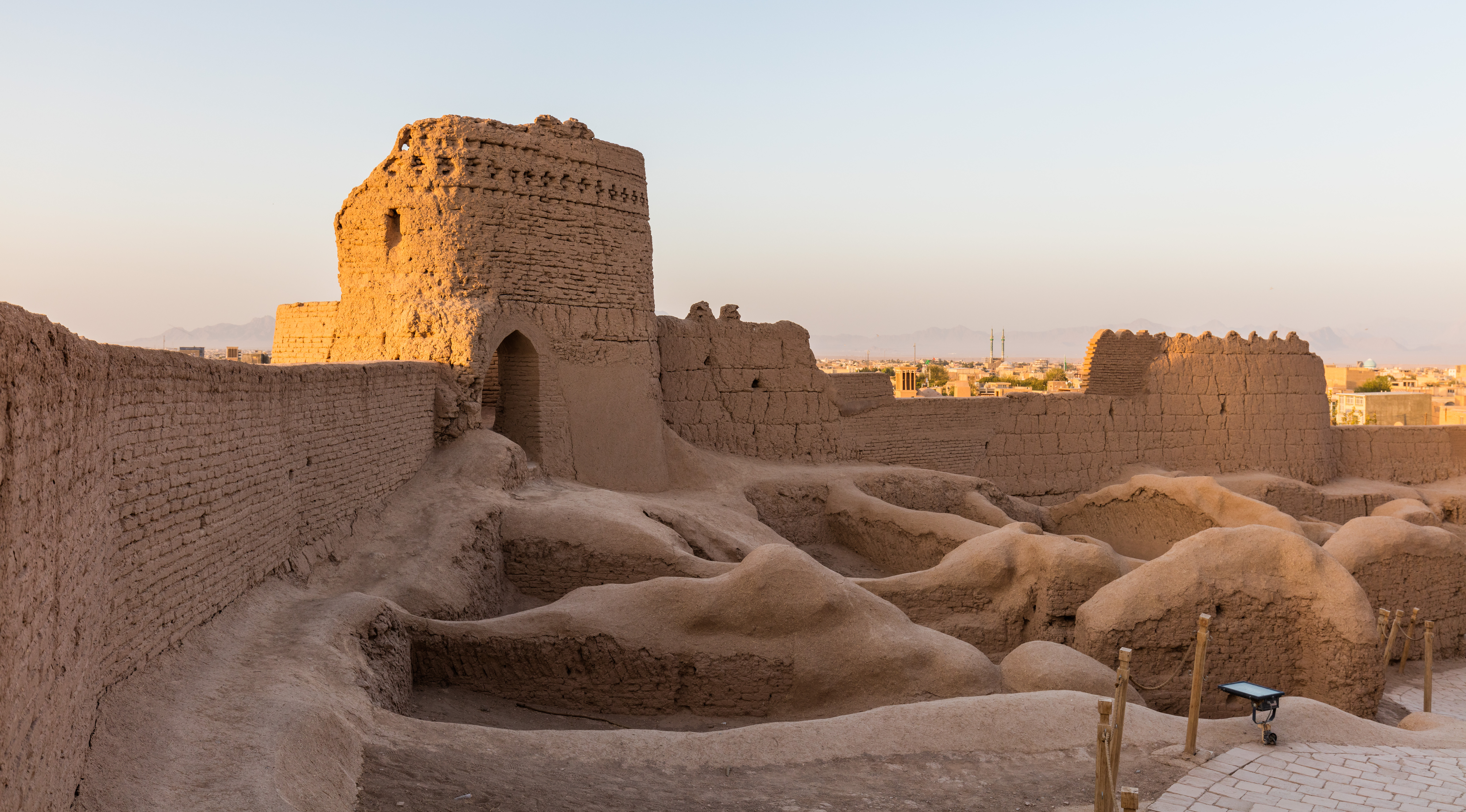
Interior of the citadel.

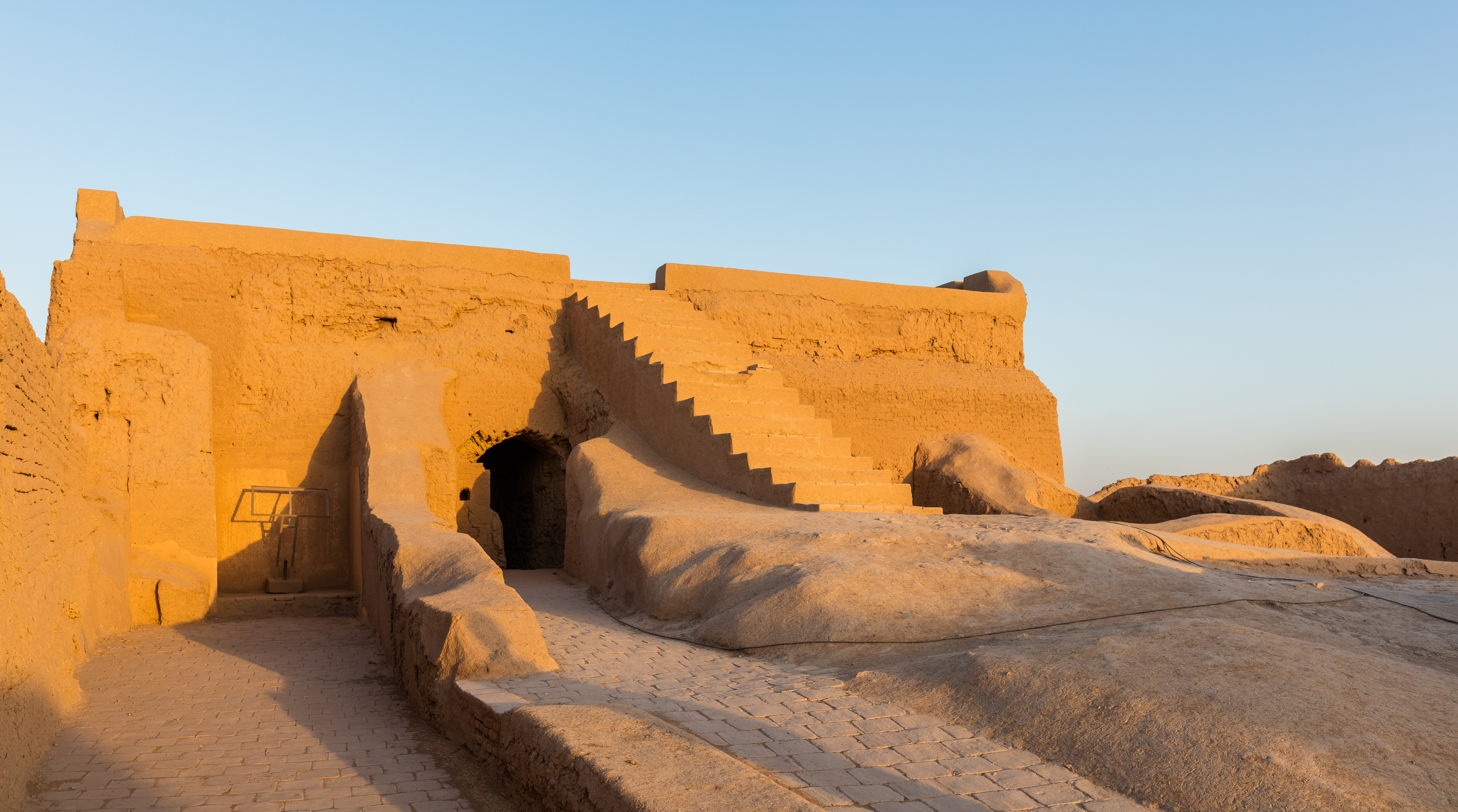
Top area.

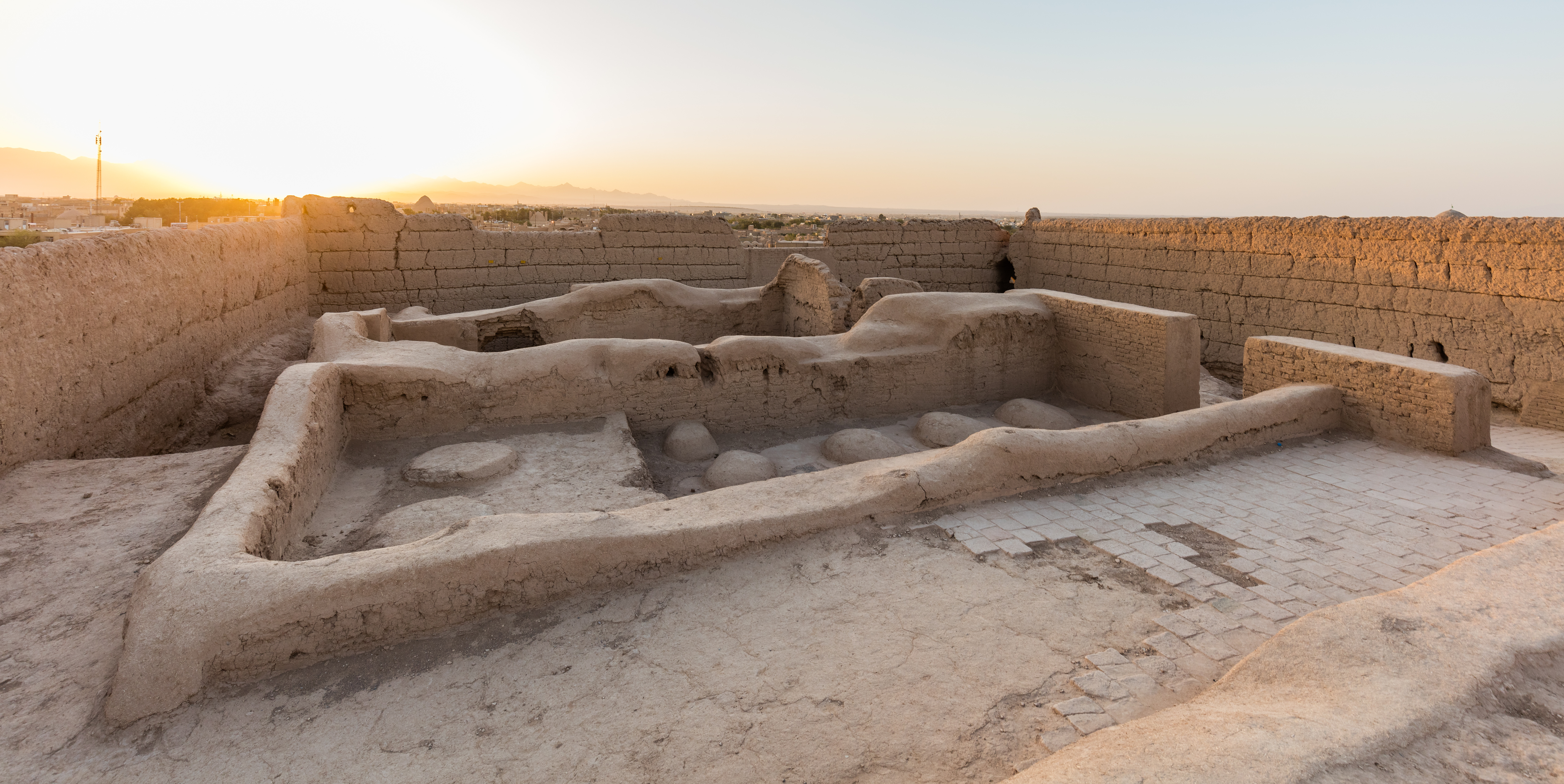
Ruins of a former building.

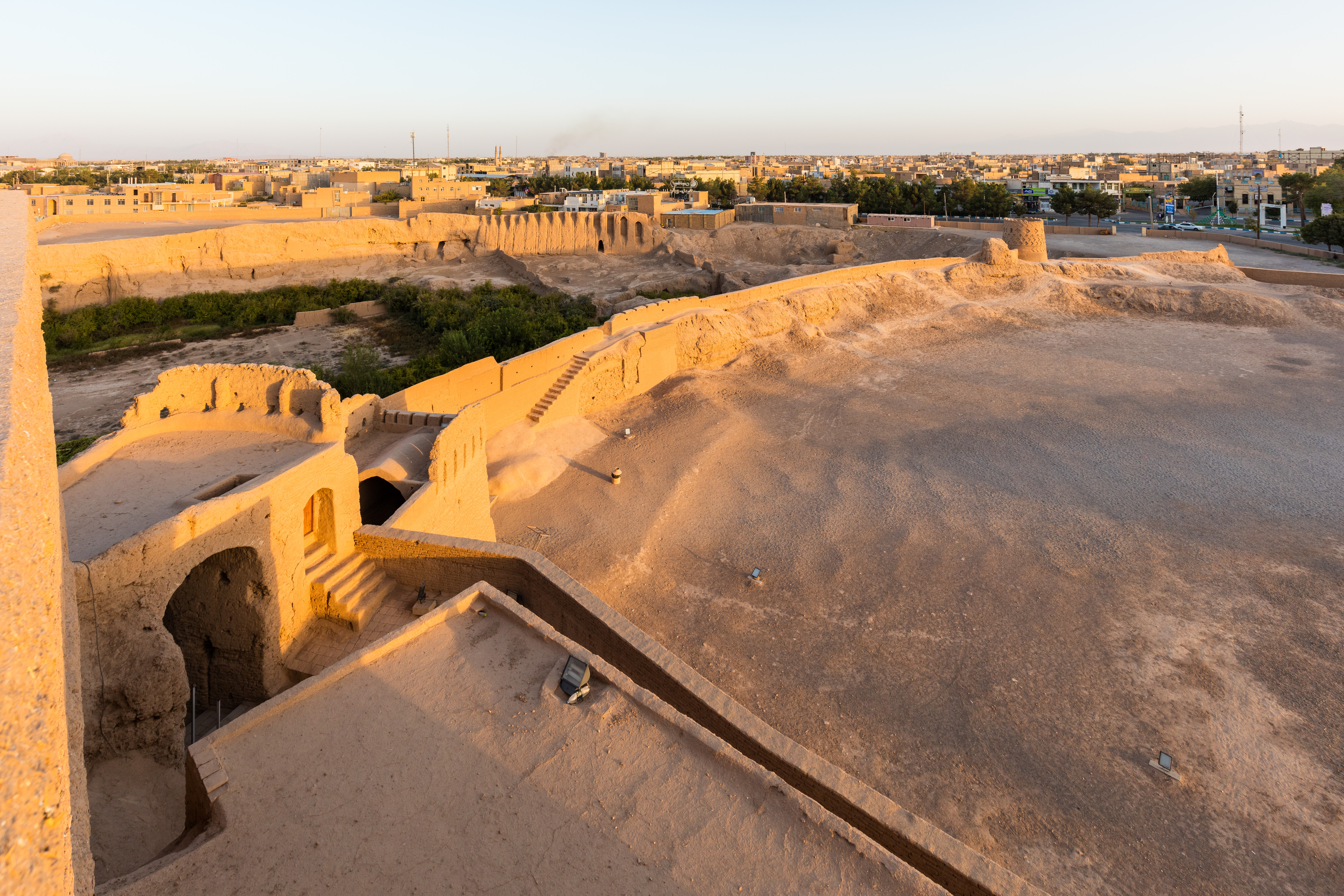
View from the top.

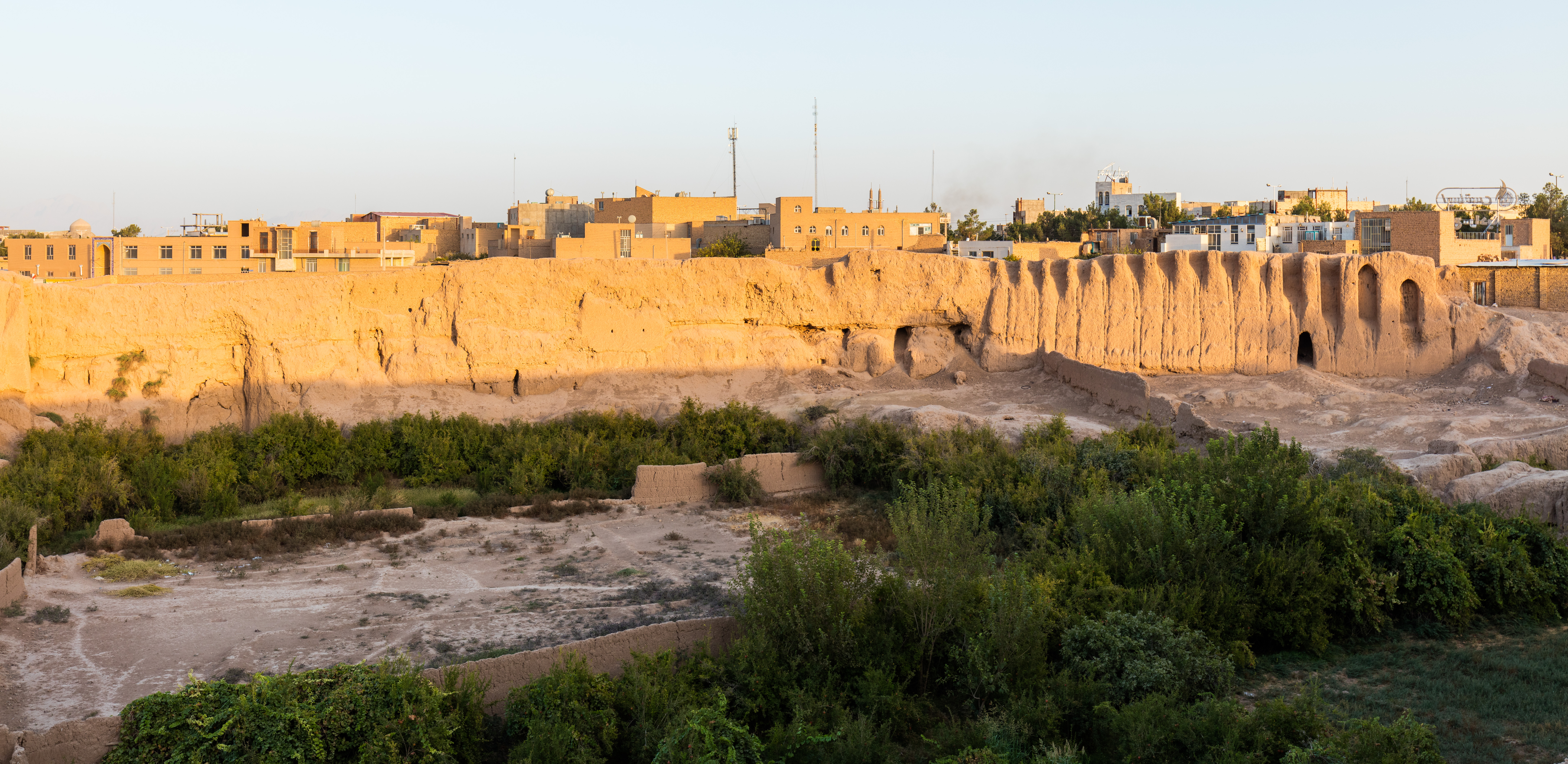
View of Meybod from the citadel.

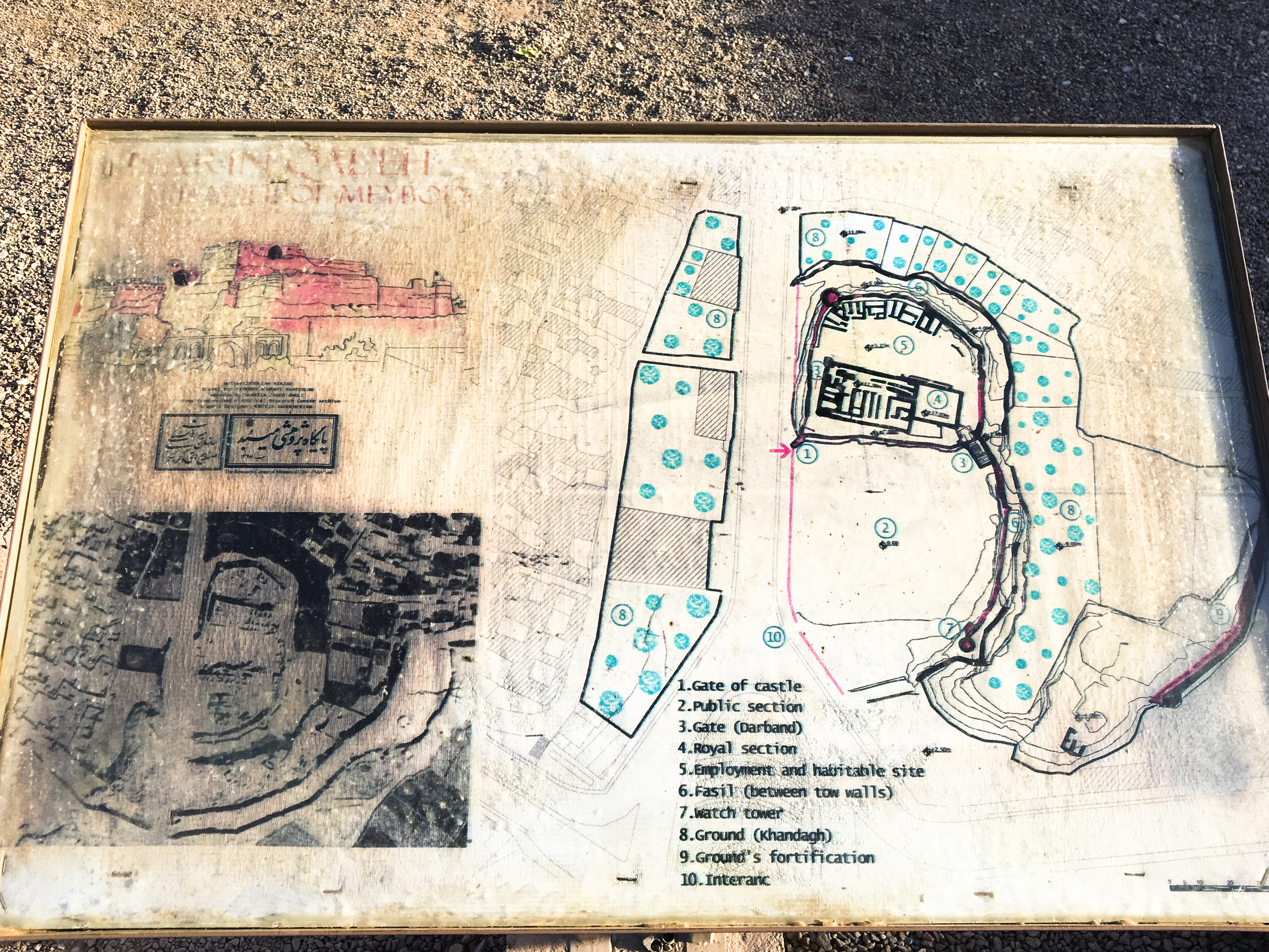
Narin Castle The View of Map

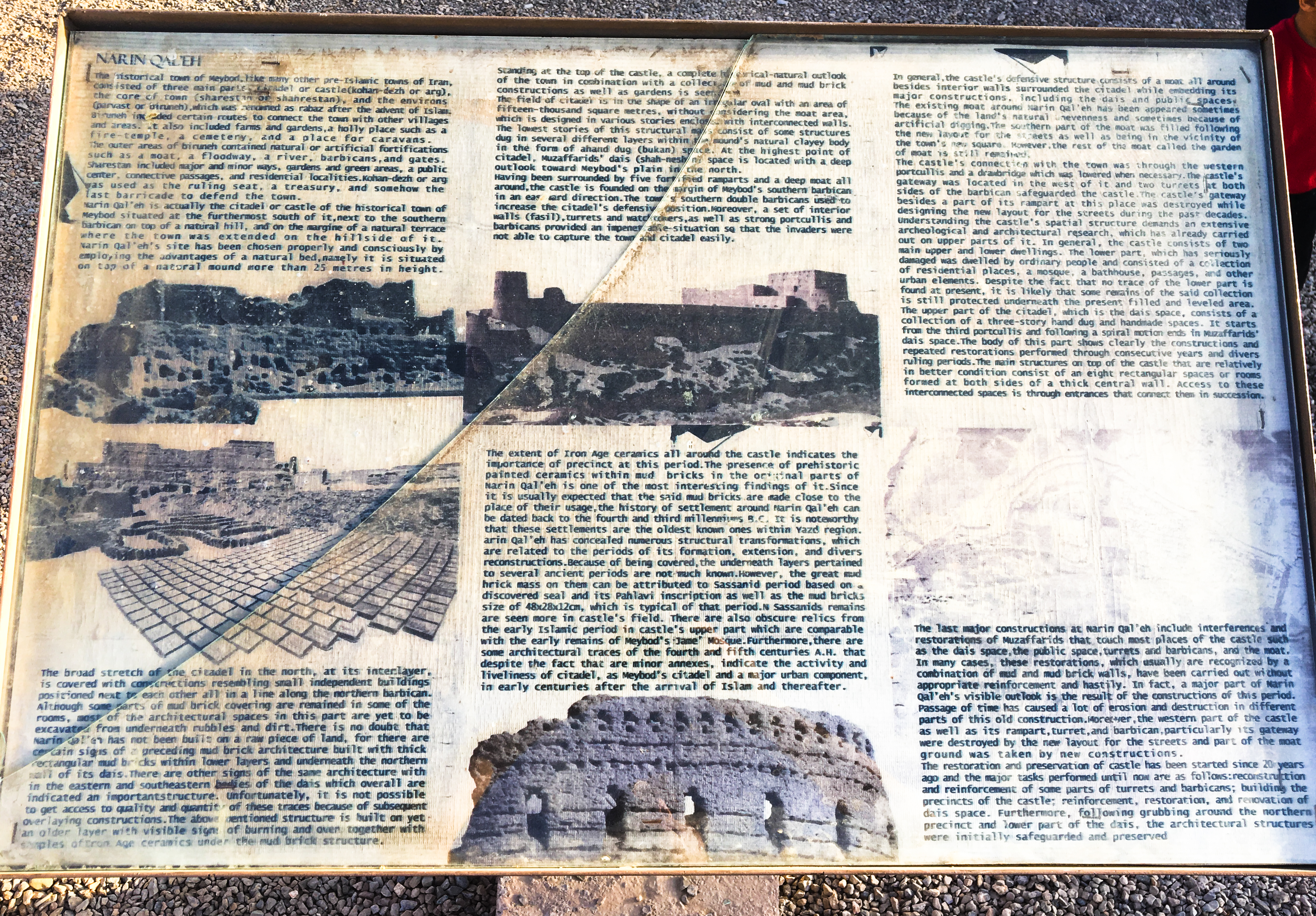
Narin Castle The View of History

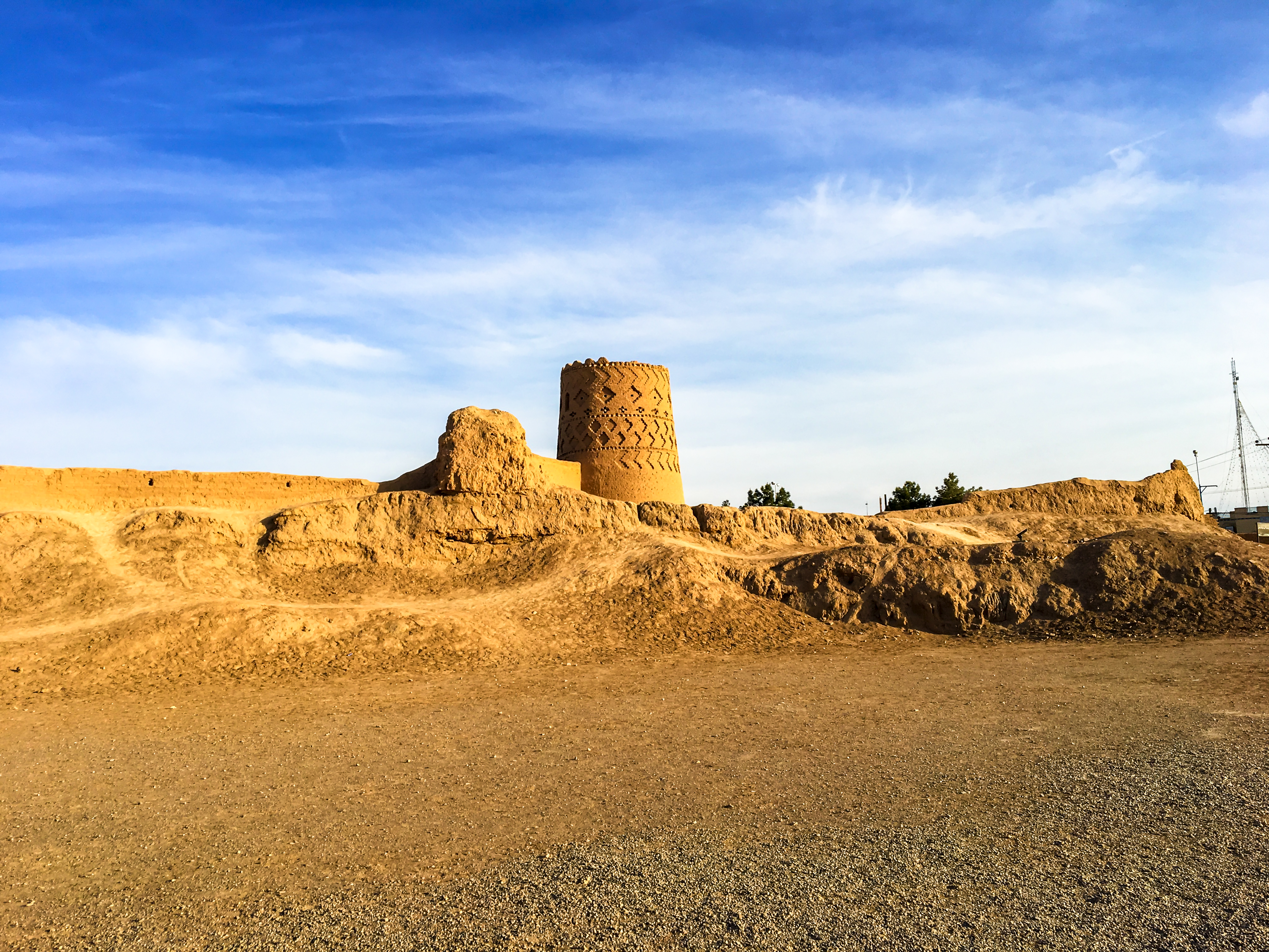
Narin Castle - The View from castle to front yard

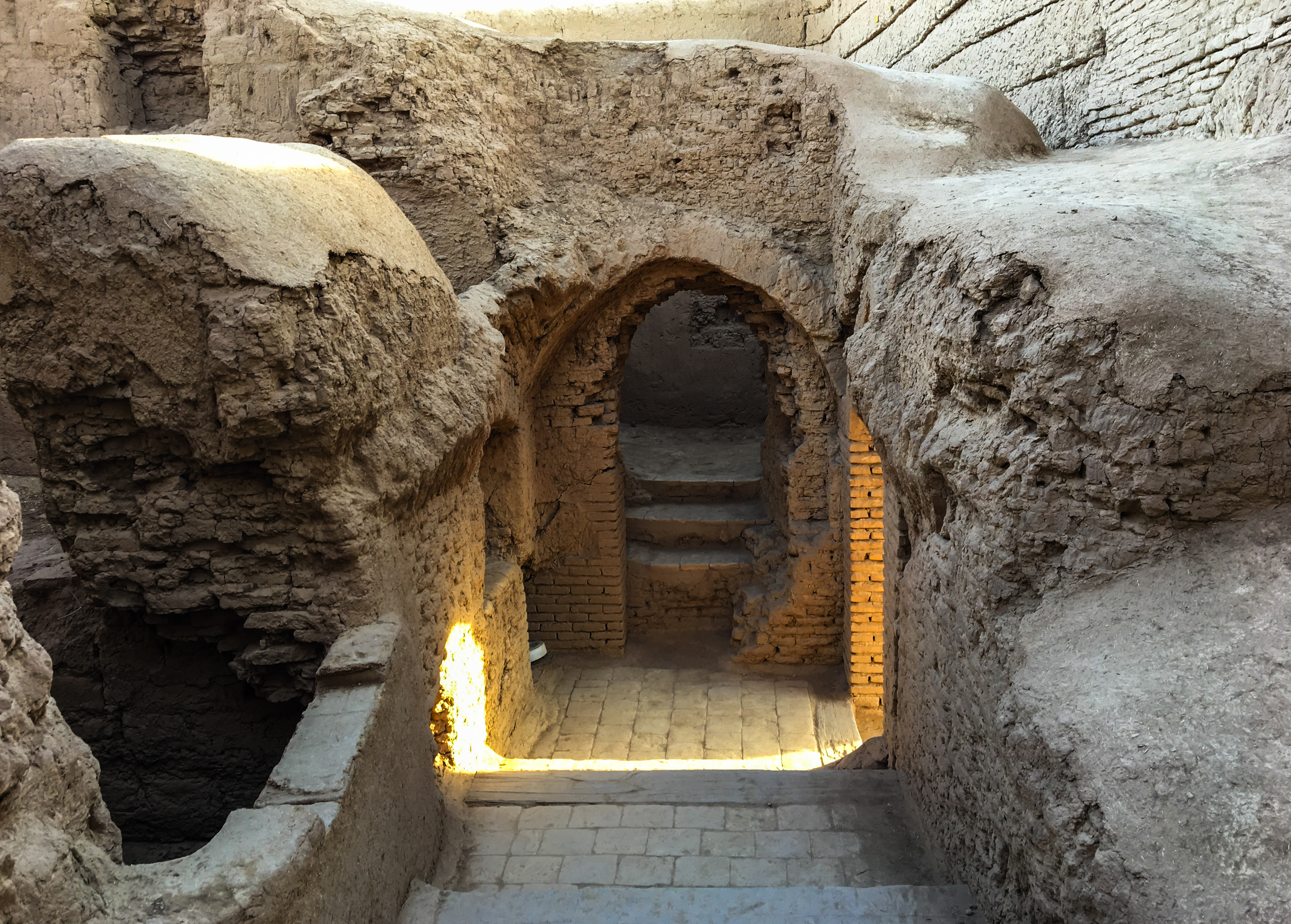
Narin Castle - Part of the castle from inside

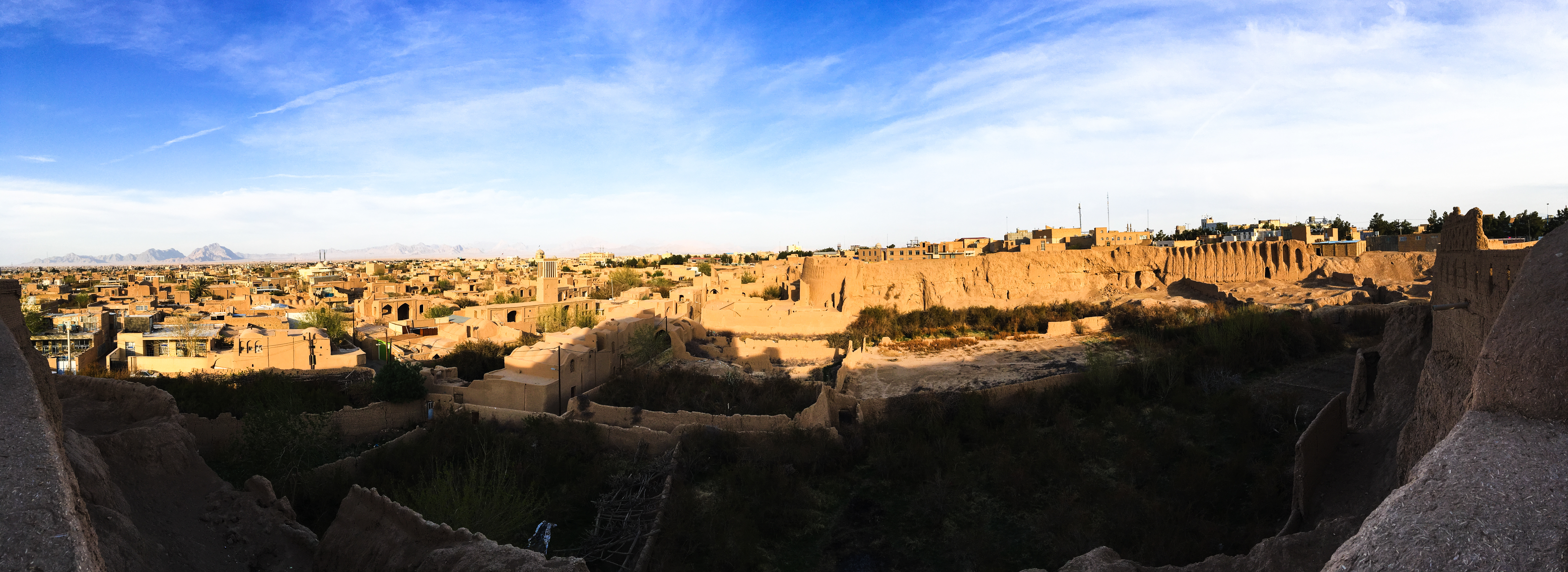
A Panoramic view of Meybod and Back of castle

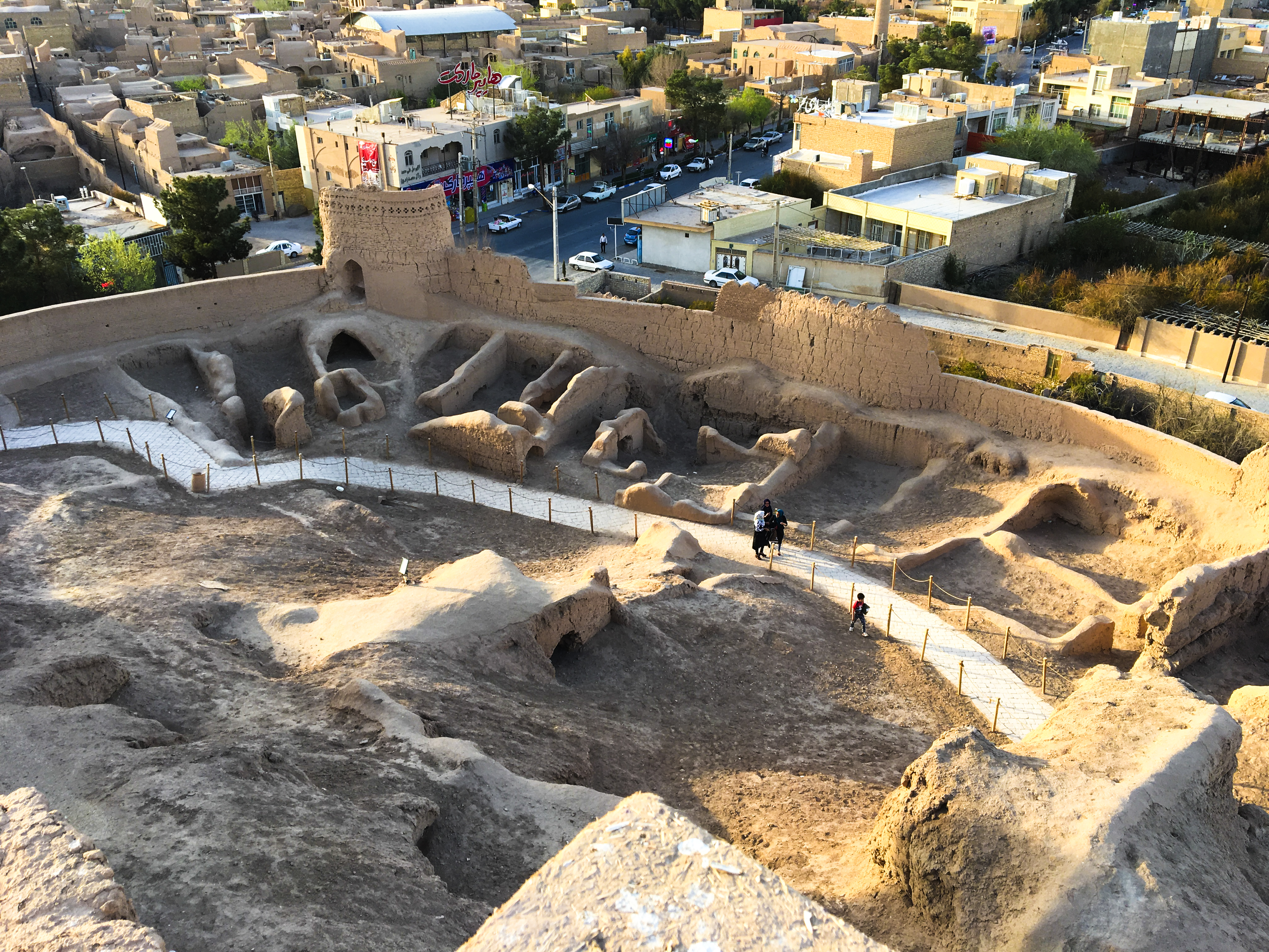
Narin Castle, a view of castle from inside

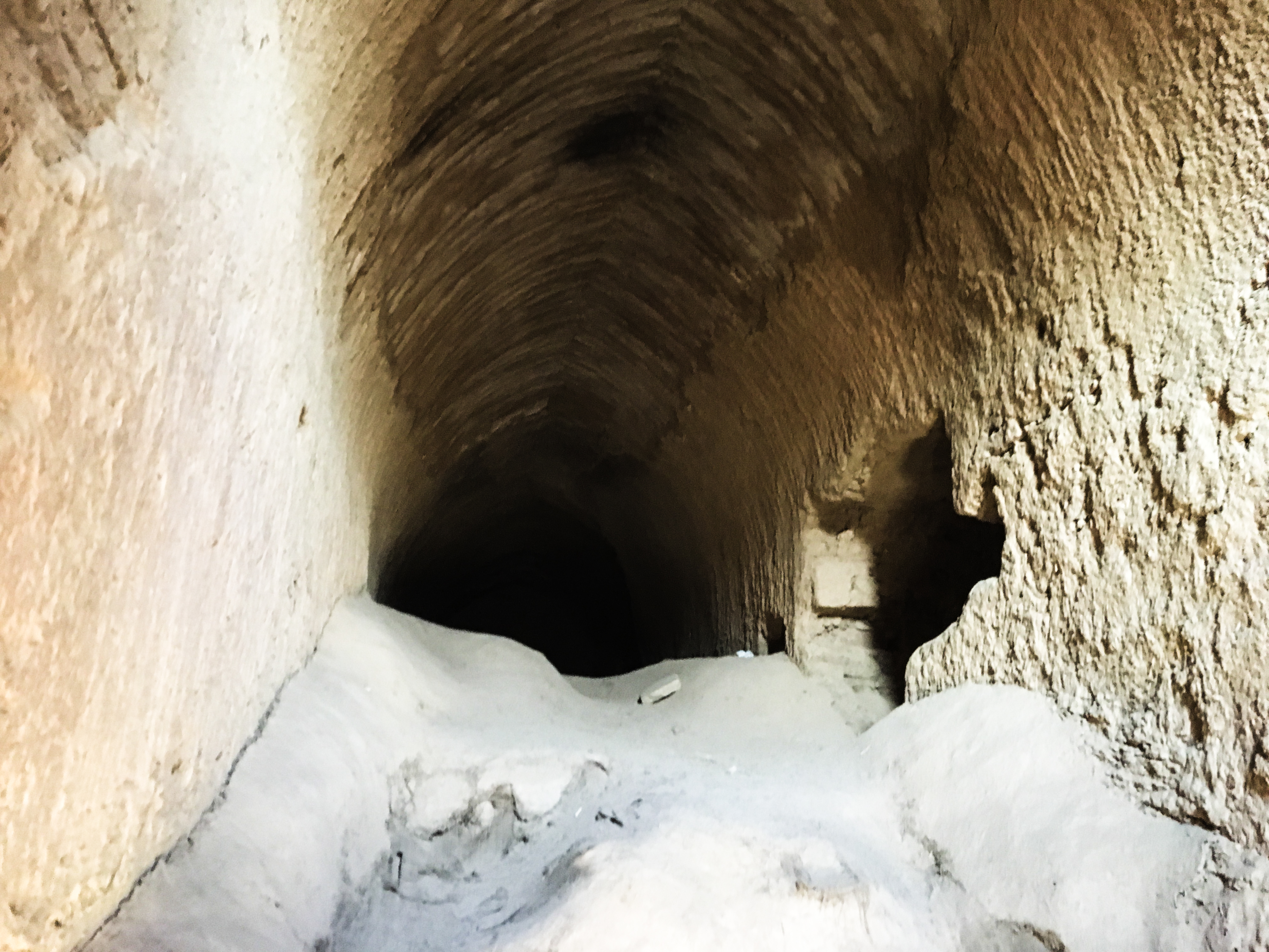
Narin Castle - Some tunnels inside the castle

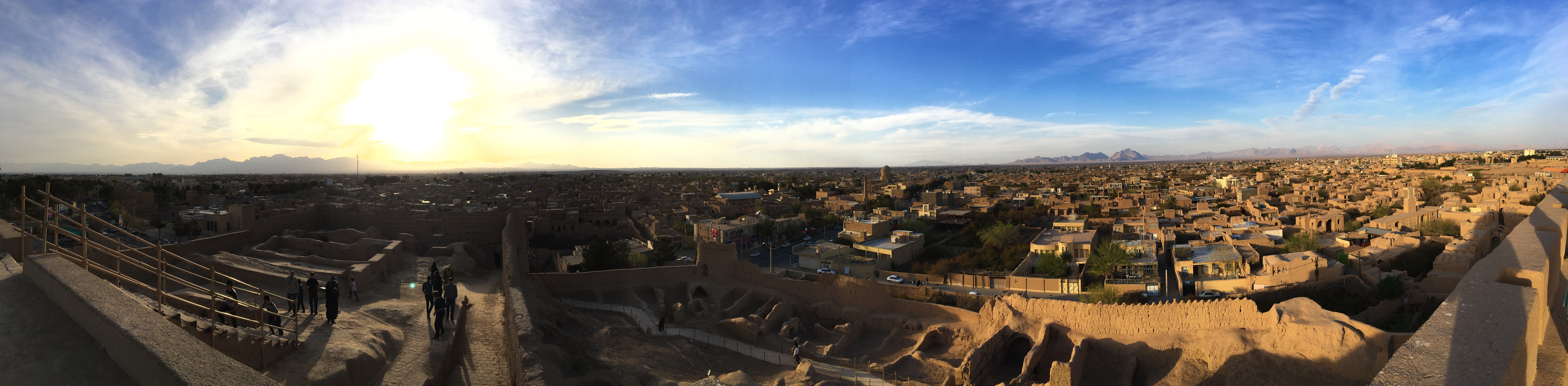
Narin Castle - Panoramic view of Meybod from Castle

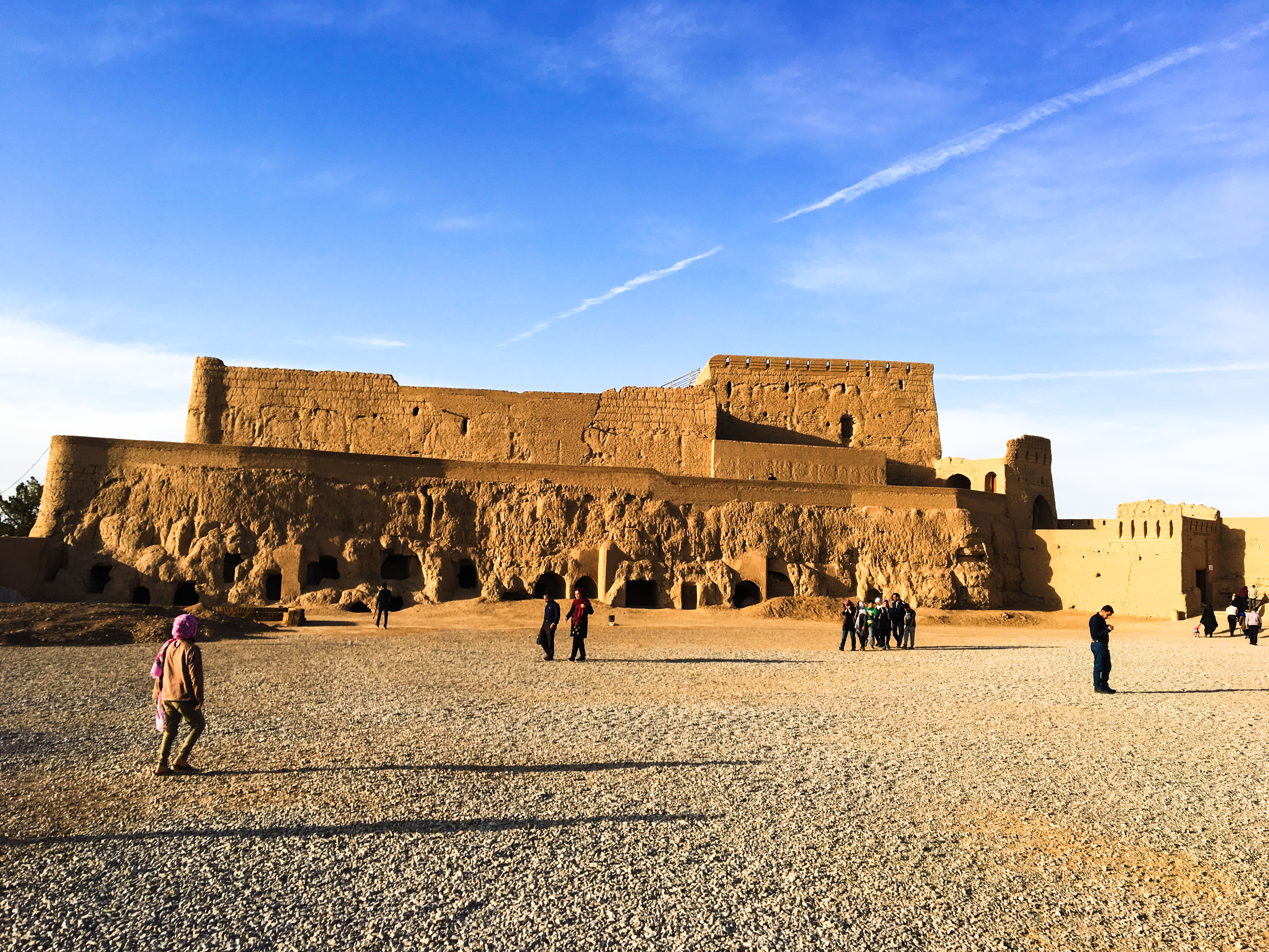
Narin Castle

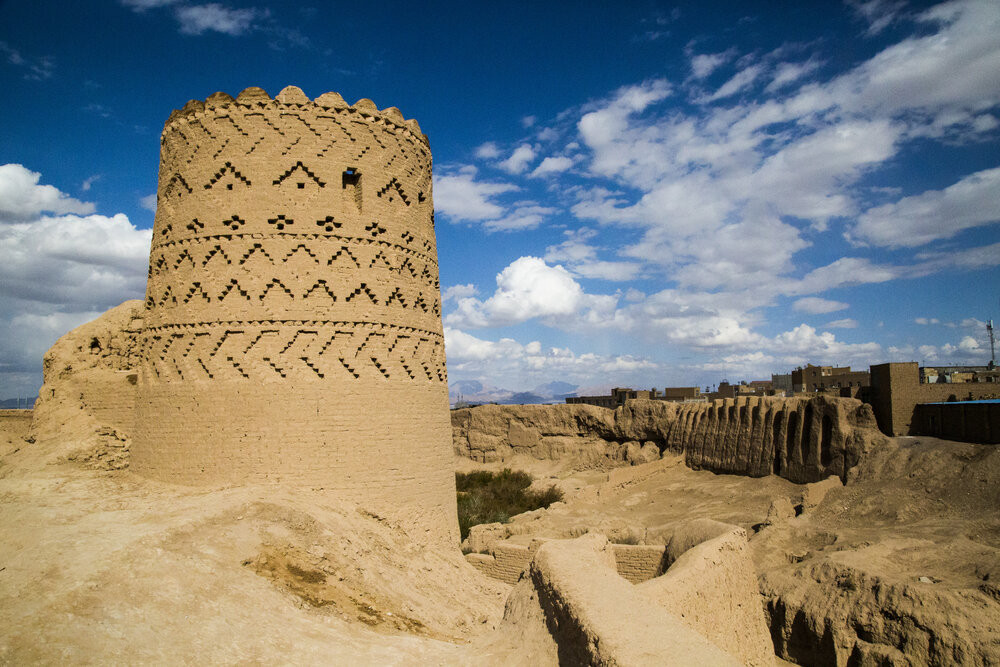
Bastion

== See also ==
- List of Iranian castles
- Iranian architecture
