= Hojjatabad-e Sofla, Kermanshah =

Hojjatabad-e Sofla حجت‌آباد سفلی
- Village
- Location within Iran
- Coordinates: 34°28′49″N 47°00′09″E
- Country: Iran
- Province: Kermanshah
- County: Kermanshah
- Bakhsh: Central
- Rural District: Miyan Darband

Population (2006)
  - Total: 26
- Time zone: UTC+3:30 (IRST)
  - Summer (DST): UTC+4:30 (IRDT)

Hojjatabad-e Sofla (Persian: حجت‌آباد سفلی, also Romanized as Ḩojjatābād-e Soflá) is a village in Miyan Darband Rural District, in the Central District of Kermanshah County, Kermanshah Province, Iran. At the 2006 census, its population was 26, in 6 families.
