= Mehrabad-e Tudehrud =

Mehrabad-e Tudehrud مهرابادتوده رود
- Village
- Location within Iran
- Coordinates: 34°11′00″N 47°45′00″E
- Country: Iran
- Province: Lorestan
- County: Delfan
- Bakhsh: Kakavand
- Rural District: Kakavand-e Sharqi

Population (2006)
  - Total: 113
- Time zone: UTC+3:30 (IRST)
  - Summer (DST): UTC+4:30 (IRDT)

Mehrabad-e Tudehrud (Persian: مهرابادتوده رود, also Romanized as Mehrābād-e Tūdehrūd and Mehrābād-e Tovahrūd) is a village in Kakavand-e Sharqi Rural District, Kakavand District, Delfan County, Lorestan Province, Iran. At the 2006 census, its population was 113, in 26 families.
