= Mehrabad, Kohgiluyeh and Boyer-Ahmad =

Mehrabad مهراباد
- Village
- Location within Iran
- Coordinates: 31°10′13″N 50°27′44″E
- Country: Iran
- Province: Kohgiluyeh and Boyer-Ahmad
- County: Kohgiluyeh
- Bakhsh: Charusa
- Rural District: Tayebi-ye Sarhadi-ye Gharbi

Population (2006)
  - Total: 99
- Time zone: UTC+3:30 (IRST)
  - Summer (DST): UTC+4:30 (IRDT)

Mehrabad (Persian: مهراباد, also Romanized as Mehrābād) is a village in Tayebi-ye Sarhadi-ye Gharbi Rural District, Charusa District, Kohgiluyeh County, Kohgiluyeh and Boyer-Ahmad Province, Iran. At the 2006 census, its population was 99, in 22 families.
