= Mehrabad-e Mandegari =

Mehrabad-e Mandegari مهرابادماندگاري
- Village
- Location within Iran
- Coordinates: 27°29′44″N 53°17′49″E
- Country: Iran
- Province: Fars
- County: Lamerd
- Bakhsh: Alamarvdasht
- Rural District: Kheyrgu

Population (2006)
  - Total: 35
- Time zone: UTC+3:30 (IRST)
  - Summer (DST): UTC+4:30 (IRDT)

Mehrabad-e Mandegari (Persian: مهرابادماندگاري, also Romanized as Mehrābād-e Māndegārī; also known as Mehrābād) is a village in Kheyrgu Rural District, Alamarvdasht District, Lamerd County, Fars province, Iran. At the 2006 census, its population was 35, in 6 families.
