= Mehrabad-e Mazidi =

Mehrabad-e Mazidi مهرابادمزيدي
- Village
- Location within Iran
- Coordinates: 28°42′30″N 54°16′45″E
- Country: Iran
- Province: Fars
- County: Darab
- Bakhsh: Central
- Rural District: Fasarud

Population (2006)
  - Total: 328
- Time zone: UTC+3:30 (IRST)
  - Summer (DST): UTC+4:30 (IRDT)

Mehrabad-e Mazidi (Persian: مهرابادمزيدي, also Romanized as Mehrābād-e Mazīdī; also known as Mehrābād) is a village in Fasarud Rural District, in the Central District of Darab County, Fars province, Iran. At the 2006 census, its population was 328, in 68 families.
