= Mehrabad, Darab =

Mehrabad مهراباد
- Village
- Location within Iran
- Coordinates: 28°10′00″N 55°08′49″E
- Country: Iran
- Province: Fars
- County: Darab
- Bakhsh: Forg
- Rural District: Abshur

Population (2006)
  - Total: 915
- Time zone: UTC+3:30 (IRST)
  - Summer (DST): UTC+4:30 (IRDT)

Mehrabad (Persian: مهراباد, also Romanized as Mehrābād) is a village in Abshur Rural District, Forg District, Darab County, Fars province, Iran. At the 2006 census, its population was 915, in 186 families.
