= Mehrabad, Bam =

Mehrabad مهراباد
- Village
- Location within Iran
- Coordinates: 29°00′06″N 58°05′05″E
- Country: Iran
- Province: Kerman
- County: Bam
- Bakhsh: Central
- Rural District: Howmeh

Population (2006)
  - Total: 45
- Time zone: UTC+3:30 (IRST)
  - Summer (DST): UTC+4:30 (IRDT)

Mehrabad (Persian: مهراباد, also Romanized as Mehrābād; also known as Darreh Bīdūn) is a village in Howmeh Rural District, in the Central District of Bam County, Kerman Province, Iran. At the 2006 census, its population was 45, in 13 families.
