= Venin, Iran =

Village in Isfahan province, Iran

Venin Persian: ونين
- Village
- Location within Iran
- Coordinates: 33°17′32″N 52°27′43″E
- Country: Iran
- Province: Isfahan
- County: Ardestan
- District: Central
- Rural District: Kachu

Population (2016)
  - Total: 55
- Time zone: UTC+3:30 (IRST)

Venin (Persian: ونين) (Note: Also romanized as Vanīn and Venīn) is a village in Kachu Rural District of the Central District in Ardestan County, Isfahan province, Iran.

== Demographics ==
=== Population ===
At the time of the 2006 National Census, the village's population was 31 in 12 households. The following census in 2011 counted 22 people in nine households. The 2016 census measured the population of the village as 55 people in 26 households.
