= Mehrabad-e Shor Shor =

Mehrabad-e Shor Shor مهرابادشرشر
- Village
- Location within Iran
- Coordinates: 36°20′40″N 59°51′13″E
- Country: Iran
- Province: Razavi Khorasan
- County: Mashhad
- Bakhsh: Central
- Rural District: Kenevist

Population (2006)
  - Total: 88
- Time zone: UTC+3:30 (IRST)
  - Summer (DST): UTC+4:30 (IRDT)

Mehrabad-e Shor Shor (Persian: مهرابادشرشر, also Romanized as Mehrābād-e Shor Shor; also known as Mehrābād and Mehrābādā) is a village in Kenevist Rural District, in the Central District of Mashhad County, Razavi Khorasan Province, Iran. At the 2006 census, its population was 88, in 20 families.
