= Naryn Castle, Ardabil =

Castle in Ardabil Province, Iran

Naryn Castle
- نارین قلعه

General information
- Type: Castle
- Location: Ardabil, Iran

Naryn Castle (Persian: نارین قلعه) is a castle in Ardabil County, Ardabil Province, Iran. It was destroyed in the 20th century during the reign of Reza Shah.
