= Mehrabad, Khusf =

Mehrabad مهراباد
- Village
- Location within Iran
- Coordinates: 32°28′00″N 58°52′09″E
- Country: Iran
- Province: South Khorasan
- County: Khusf
- Bakhsh: Central District
- Rural District: Khusf

Population (2006)
  - Total: 18
- Time zone: UTC+3:30 (IRST)
  - Summer (DST): UTC+4:30 (IRDT)

Mehrabad (Persian: مهراباد, also Romanized as Mehrābād) is a village in Khusf Rural District, Central District, Khusf County, South Khorasan Province, Iran. At the 2006 census, its population was 18, in 7 families.
