= Naryn Castle, Sardrud =

Castle in East Azerbaijan Province, Iran

Naryn Castle
- نارین قلعه

General information
- Type: Castle
- Location: Sardrud, Iran

Naryn Castle (Persian: نارین قلعه) is a historical castle located in Tabriz County in East Azerbaijan Province, The longevity of this fortress dates back to the 1st millennium BC.
