= Bafruiyeh =

City in Yazd province, Iran

Bafruiyeh Persian: بفروييه
- City
- Location within Iran
- Coordinates: 32°16′34″N 53°59′40″E
- Country: Iran
- Province: Yazd
- County: Meybod
- District: Bafruiyeh

Population (2016)
  - Total: 6,939
- Time zone: UTC+3:30 (IRST)

Bafruiyeh (Persian: بفروييه) (Note: Also romanized as Bafrū’īyeh and Bafruyeh) is a city in, and the capital of, Bafruiyeh District of Meybod County, Yazd province, Iran. It also serves as the administrative center for Bafruiyeh Rural District.

== Demographics ==
=== Population ===
At the time of the 2006 National Census, Bafruiyeh's population was 5,752 in 1,578 households, when it was a village in Bafruiyeh Rural District of the Central District. The following census in 2011 counted 6,486 people in 1,895 households, by which time the village had been elevated to the status of a city. The 2016 census measured the population of the city as 6,939 people in 2,105 households, when the city and the rural district had separated from the district in the formation of Bafruiyeh District.
