= Mehrabad, Ardestan =

Village in Isfahan province, Iran

Mehrabad Persian: مهراباد
- Village
- Location within Iran
- Coordinates: 33°14′59″N 52°37′15″E
- Country: Iran
- Province: Isfahan
- County: Ardestan
- District: Central
- Rural District: Kachu

Population (2016)
  - Total: 42
- Time zone: UTC+3:30 (IRST)

Mehrabad (Persian: مهراباد) (Note: Also romanized as Mehrābād; also known as Mihrābād) is a village in Kachu Rural District of the Central District in Ardestan County, Isfahan province, Iran.

== Demographics ==
=== Population ===
At the time of the 2006 National Census, the village's population was 19 in seven households. The following census in 2011 counted a population below the reporting threshold. The 2016 census measured the population of the village as 42 people in 20 households.
