= Bafruiyeh District =

District in Yazd province, Iran

Bafruiyeh District Persian: بخش بفروئيه
- District
- Location within Iran
- Coordinates: 32°11′50″N 53°45′37″E
- Country: Iran
- Province: Yazd
- County: Meybod
- Capital: Bafruiyeh

Population (2016)
  - Total: 10,837
- Time zone: UTC+3:30 (IRST)

Bafruiyeh District (Persian: بخش بفروئيه) is in Meybod County, Yazd province, Iran. Its capital is the city of Bafruiyeh.

== History ==
After the 2006 National Census, the village of Bafruiyeh was elevated to the status of a city. After the 2011 census, Bafruiyeh Rural District and the city of Bafruiyeh were separated from the Central District in the formation of Bafruiyeh District.

== Demographics ==
=== Population ===
At the time of the 2016 census, the district's population was 10,837 inhabitants in 3,291 households.

=== Administrative divisions ===
Bafruiyeh District Population
Administrative Divisions	2016
Bafruiyeh RD	3,197
Dareyn RD (Note: Formerly Surk Rural District)	701
Bafruiyeh (city)	6,939
Total	10,837
RD = Rural District
