= Meybod =

City in Yazd province, Iran

Meybod Persian: میبد
- City
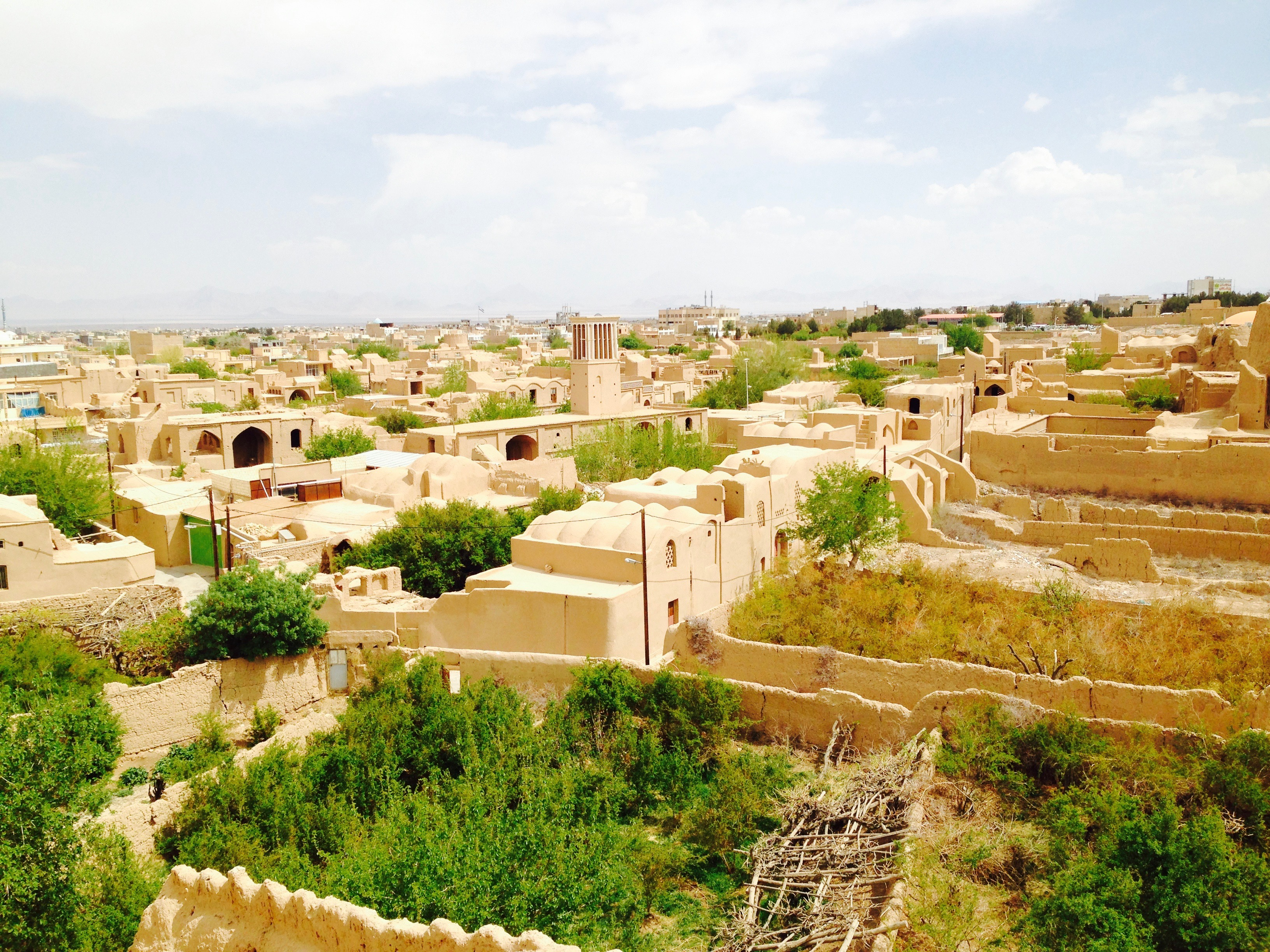
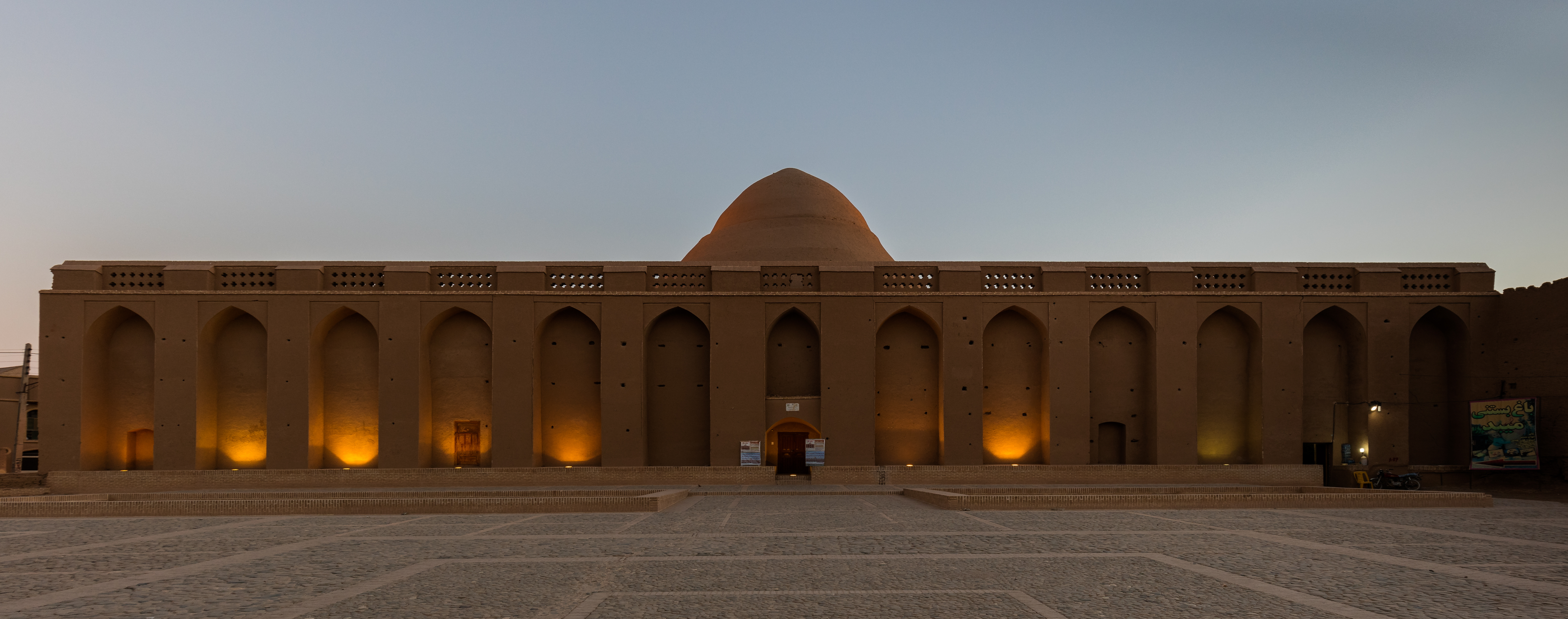
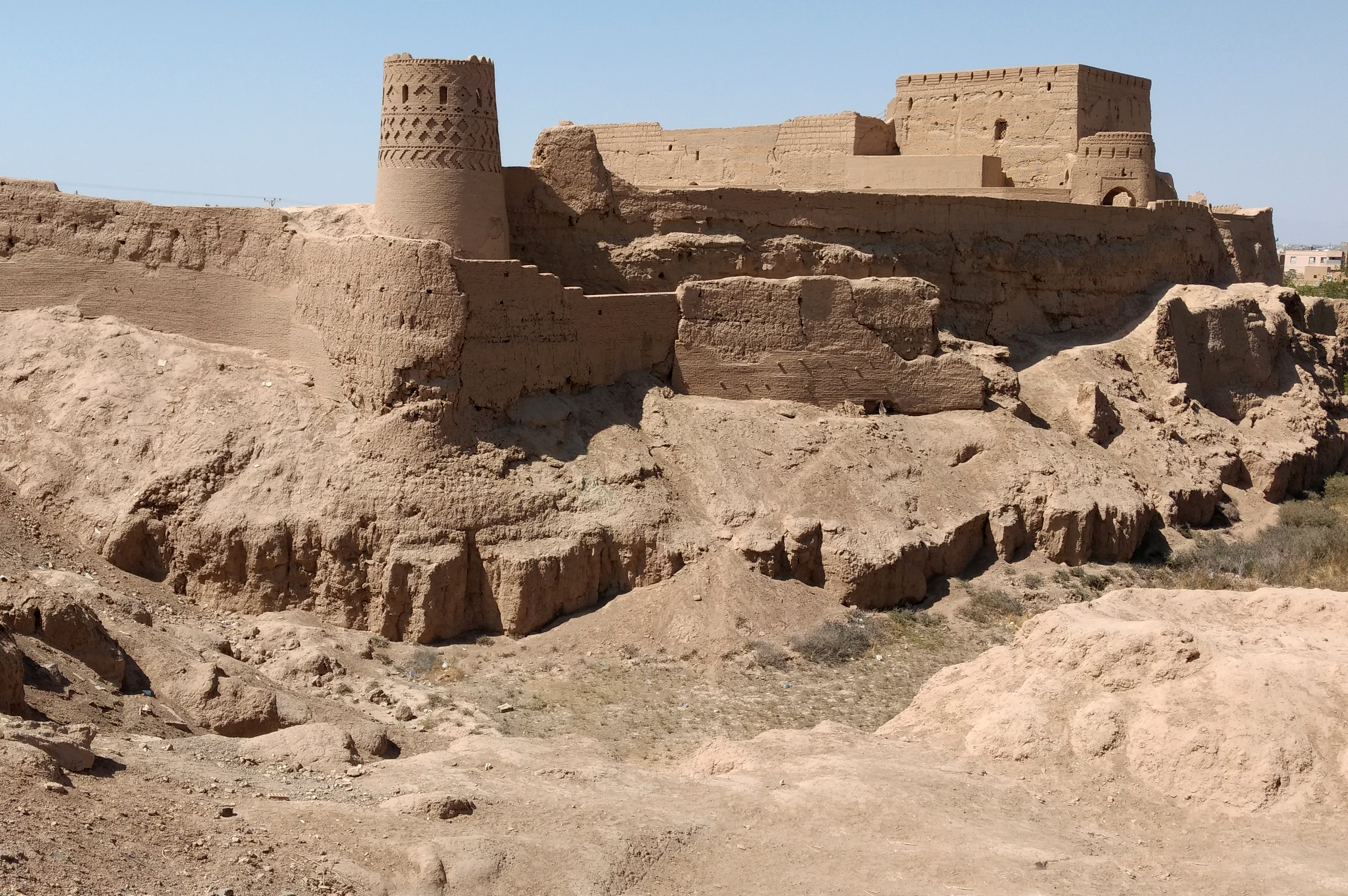
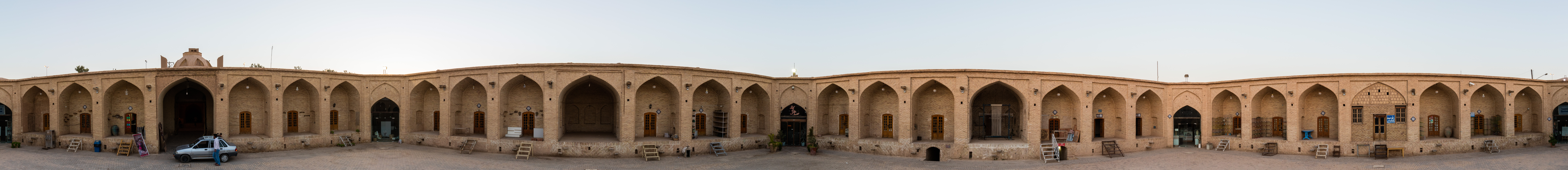
- View of Meybod from Naryn Castle Meybod Icehouse Naryn Castle Meybod Shah'abbasi Caravanserai

- Location within Iran
- Coordinates: 32°14′44″N 54°00′55″E
- Country: Iran
- Province: Yazd
- County: Meybod
- District: Central
- Elevation: 1,234 m (4,049 ft)

Population (2016)
  - Total: 80,712
- Time zone: UTC+3:30 (IRST)
- Website: http://www.meybod.ir

Meybod (Persian: میبد) (Note: Also known as Maibud) is a city in the Central District of Meybod County, Yazd province, Iran, serving as capital of both the county and the district. Meybod is a major desert city and the second most populous city in the province.

== History ==
Meybod is an ancient city that traces its origins to the pre-Islamic era and, hence, is the home to many ancient points of interests. The Historical City of Meybod is part of the Tentative List, in order to qualify for inclusion in the World Heritage List.

It was the capital of Iran during the period of the Mozaffarids. The Mozaffarid kingdom originated from Meybod where the first king, Mubariz al-Din Muhammad, was born. One of the oldest castles in Iran is Narin ghaleh in Meybod, which dates back to the Achaemenid and Sassanid periods. Chaparkhaneh and Karvansaraye Abbasi are some other examples of the historical buildings from Safavid era. The town was sacked and massacred by the Mongols and later the Timurids, however it recovered under the Safavids.

Many important major poets, Sufis, clergymen and politicians came from Meybod. Meybodi, the author of "Kashf-ol-Asrar", Grand Ayatollah Haeri, Hossein Makki and many others lived in Meybod, to name a few.

Unfortunately, some of its historical points were demolished by local authorities who did not understand their archeological value. Yet, it hosts many tourists from every corner of the world every day.

== Demographics ==
=== Population ===
At the time of the 2006 National Census, the city's population was 58,295 in 15,703 households. The following census in 2011 counted 66,907 people in 19,153 households. The 2016 census measured the population of the city as 80,712 people in 23,986 households.

== Historical monuments ==
=== Narin Castle ===
This building, which in colloquial language is called Narenj Castle, is one of the most important relics of the province, dating back to the period before the advent of Islam in Iran, and has been recorded as one of the national buildings. This ancient castle was constructed on the top of Galeen hill and overlooks the city. It seems that upper floors of the building have been reconstructed and belong to the Islamic era. It may have been constructed during the period of the Mozaffarids or the Safavids. A section of the building was destroyed in the course of road construction during the reign of Reza Shah Pahlavi.

== Notable people ==
- Abdolkarim Haeri Yazdi (1859–1937), former Shia cleric
- Ayatollah Alireza Arafi (born 1959), Shia cleric and politician, born in Meybod and led Friday prayer.
- Qasem Ravanbakhsh (born 1958), Shia Cleric

== Gallery ==
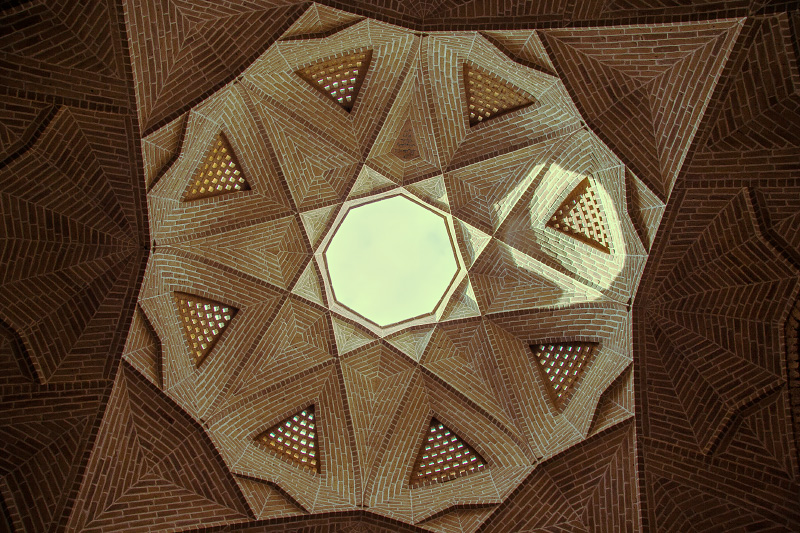
Shah Abbasi caravanserai

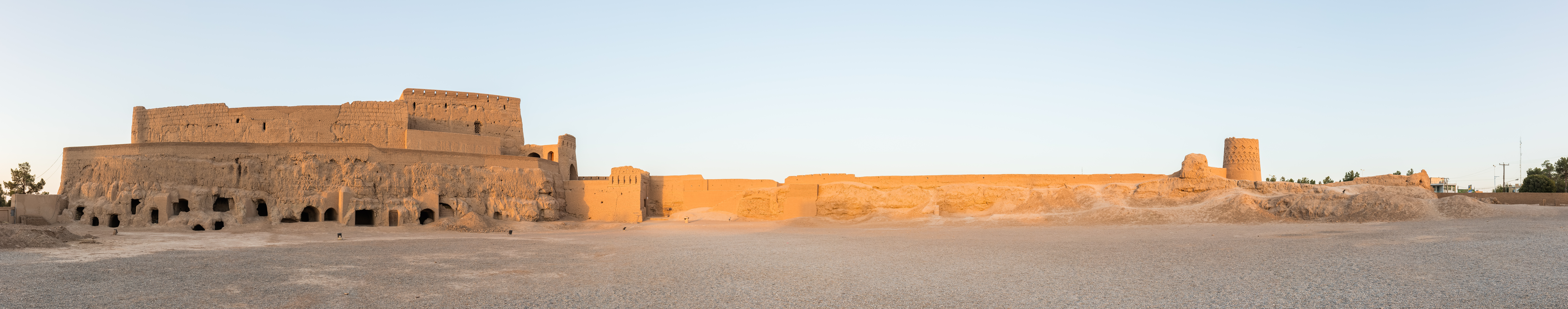
Naryn Castle

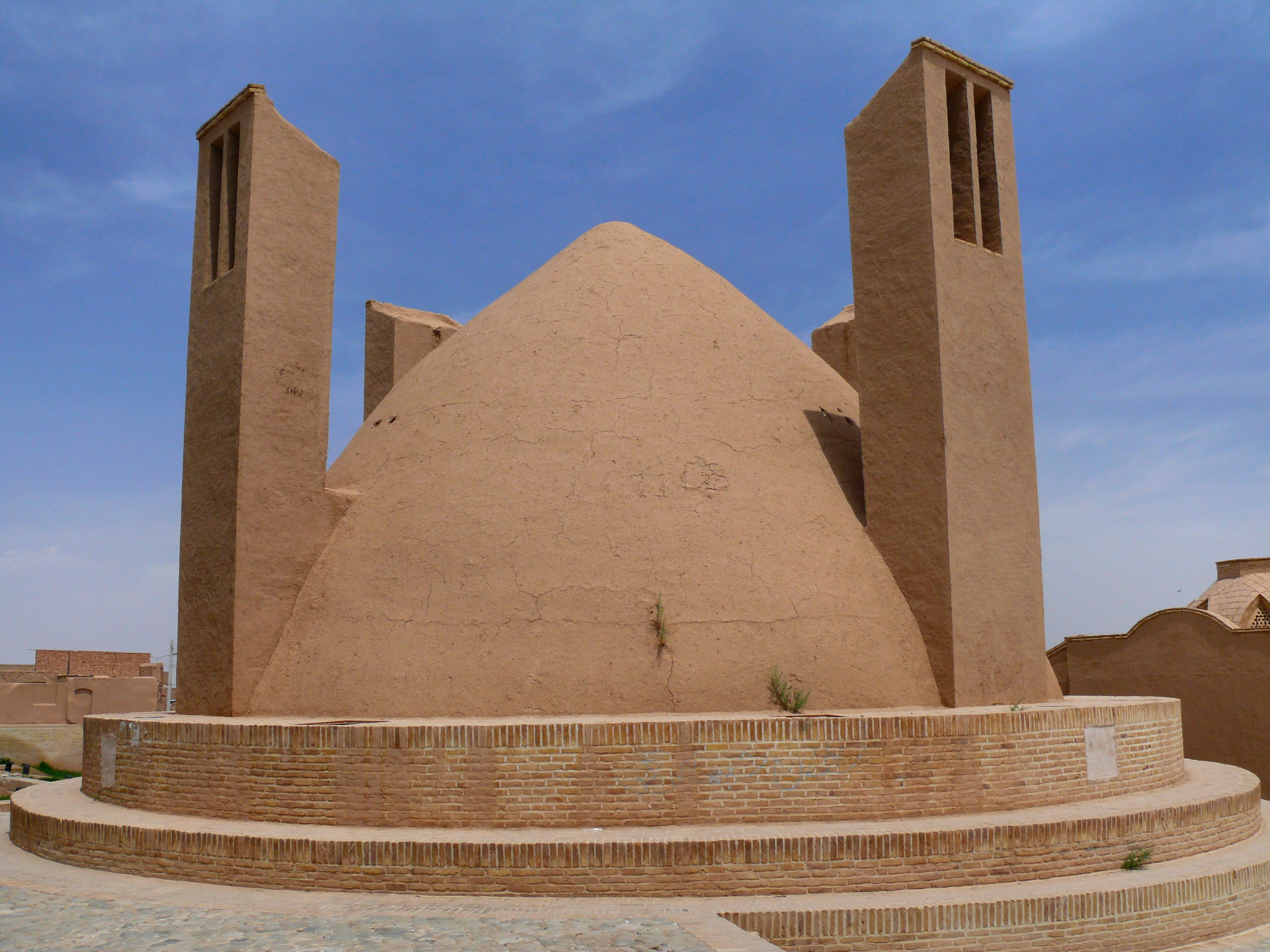
Kolar Ab Anbar with badgirs

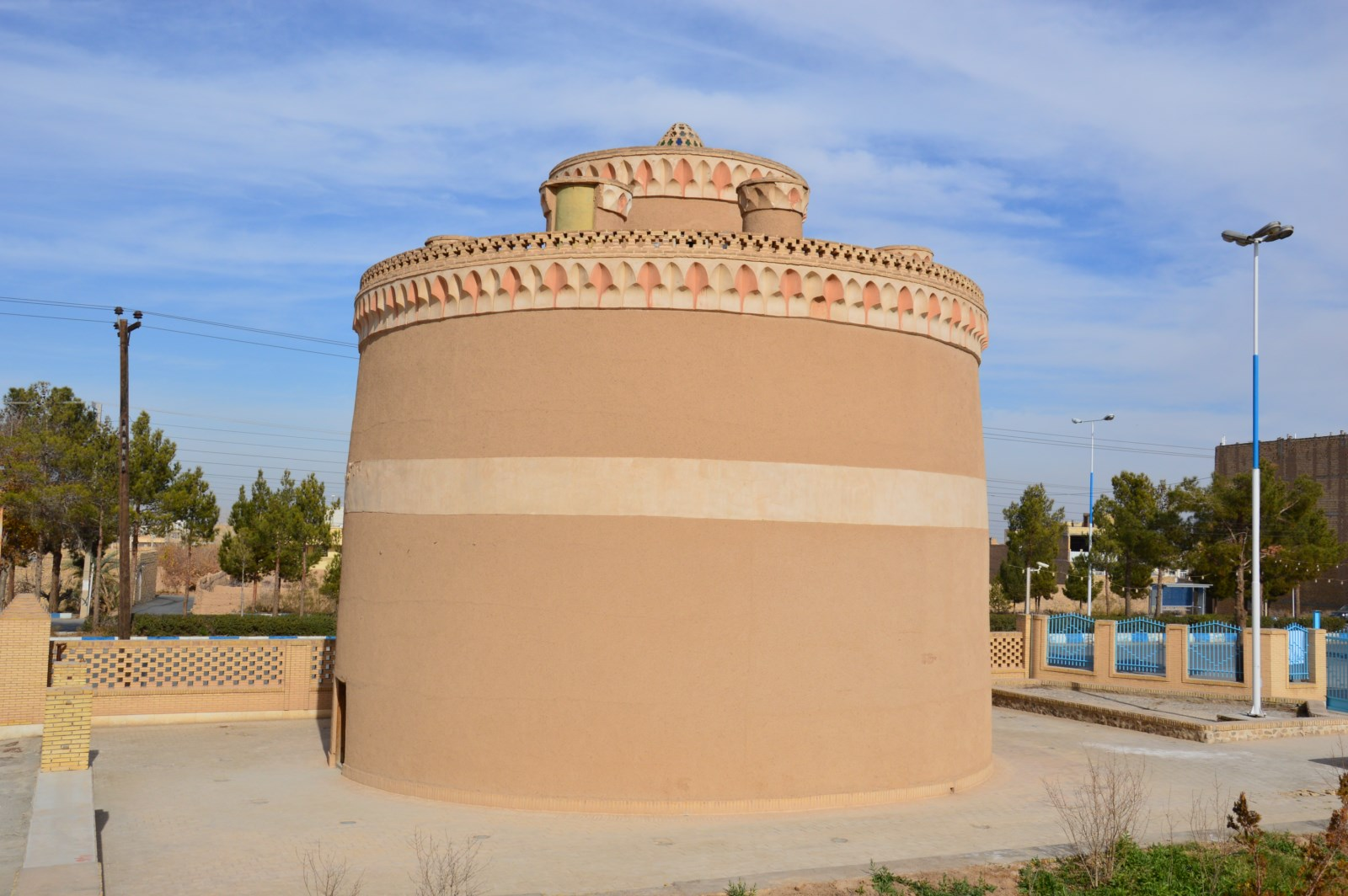
Meybod Dovecote Tower

== See also ==
Media related to Meybod at Wikimedia Commons
