= Shohada Rural District (Meybod County) =

Rural district in Yazd province, Iran

Shohada Rural District Persian: دهستان شهدا
- Rural District
- Location within Iran
- Coordinates: 32°12′56″N 54°11′32″E
- Country: Iran
- Province: Yazd
- County: Meybod
- District: Central
- Capital: Roknabad

Population (2016)
  - Total: 5,059
- Time zone: UTC+3:30 (IRST)

Shohada Rural District (Persian: دهستان شهدا) (Note: Formerly Shahidiyeh Rural District) is in the Central District of Meybod County, Yazd province, Iran. Its capital is the village of Roknabad. The previous capital of the rural district was the village of Shahidiyeh, now a neighborhood of the city of Meybod.

== Demographics ==
=== Population ===
At the time of the 2006 National Census, the rural district's population was 4,034 in 1,077 households. There were 5,581 inhabitants in 1,373 households at the following census of 2011. The 2016 census measured the population of the rural district as 5,059 in 1,380 households. The most populous of its 33 villages was Roknabad, with 2,324 people.
