= Bafruiyeh Rural District =

Rural district in Yazd province, Iran

Bafruiyeh Rural District Persian: دهستان بفروئيه
- Rural District
- Location within Iran
- Coordinates: 32°12′01″N 53°51′52″E
- Country: Iran
- Province: Yazd
- County: Meybod
- District: Bafruiyeh
- Capital: Bafruiyeh

Population (2016)
  - Total: 3,197
- Time zone: UTC+3:30 (IRST)

Bafruiyeh Rural District (Persian: دهستان بفروئيه) is in Bafruiyeh District of Meybod County, Yazd province, Iran. It is administered from the city of Bafruiyeh.

== Demographics ==
=== Population ===
At the time of the 2006 National Census, the rural district's population (as a part of the Central District) was 8,399 in 2,296 households. There were 3,866 inhabitants in 908 households at the following census of 2011. The 2016 census measured the population of the rural district as 3,197 in 946 households, by which time the rural district had been separated from the district in the formation of Bafruiyeh District. The most populous of its 72 villages was Mazraeh-ye Bideh, with 2,137 people.
