= Central District (Meybod County) =

District in Yazd province, Iran

Central District (Meybod County) Persian: بخش مرکزی شهرستان میبد
- District
- Location within Iran
- Coordinates: 32°12′56″N 54°11′32″E
- Country: Iran
- Province: Yazd
- County: Meybod
- Capital: Meybod

Population (2016)
  - Total: 85,771
- Time zone: UTC+3:30 (IRST)

The Central District of Meybod County (Persian: بخش مرکزی شهرستان میبد) is in Yazd province, Iran. Its capital is the city of Meybod.

== History ==
After the 2006 National Census, the village of Bafruiyeh was elevated to the status of a city. After the 2016 census, Bafruiyeh Rural District and the city of Bafruiyeh were separated from the district in the formation of Bafruiyeh District.

== Demographics ==
=== Population ===
At the time of the 2006 census, the district's population was 70,728 in 19,076 households. The following census in 2011 counted 82,840 people in 23,300 households. The 2016 census measured the population of the district as 85,771 inhabitants in 25,366 households.

=== Administrative divisions ===
Central District (Meybod County) Population
Administrative Divisions	2006	2011	2016
Bafruiyeh RD (Note: Transferred to Bafruiyeh District)	8,399	3,866	
Shohada RD (Note: Formerly Shahidiyeh Rural District)	4,034	5,581	5,059
Bafruiyeh (city)		6,486	
Meybod (city)	58,295	66,907	80,712
Total	70,728	82,840	85,771
RD = Rural District
