= Meybod County =

County in Yazd province, Iran

Meybod County Persian: شهرستان میبد
- County
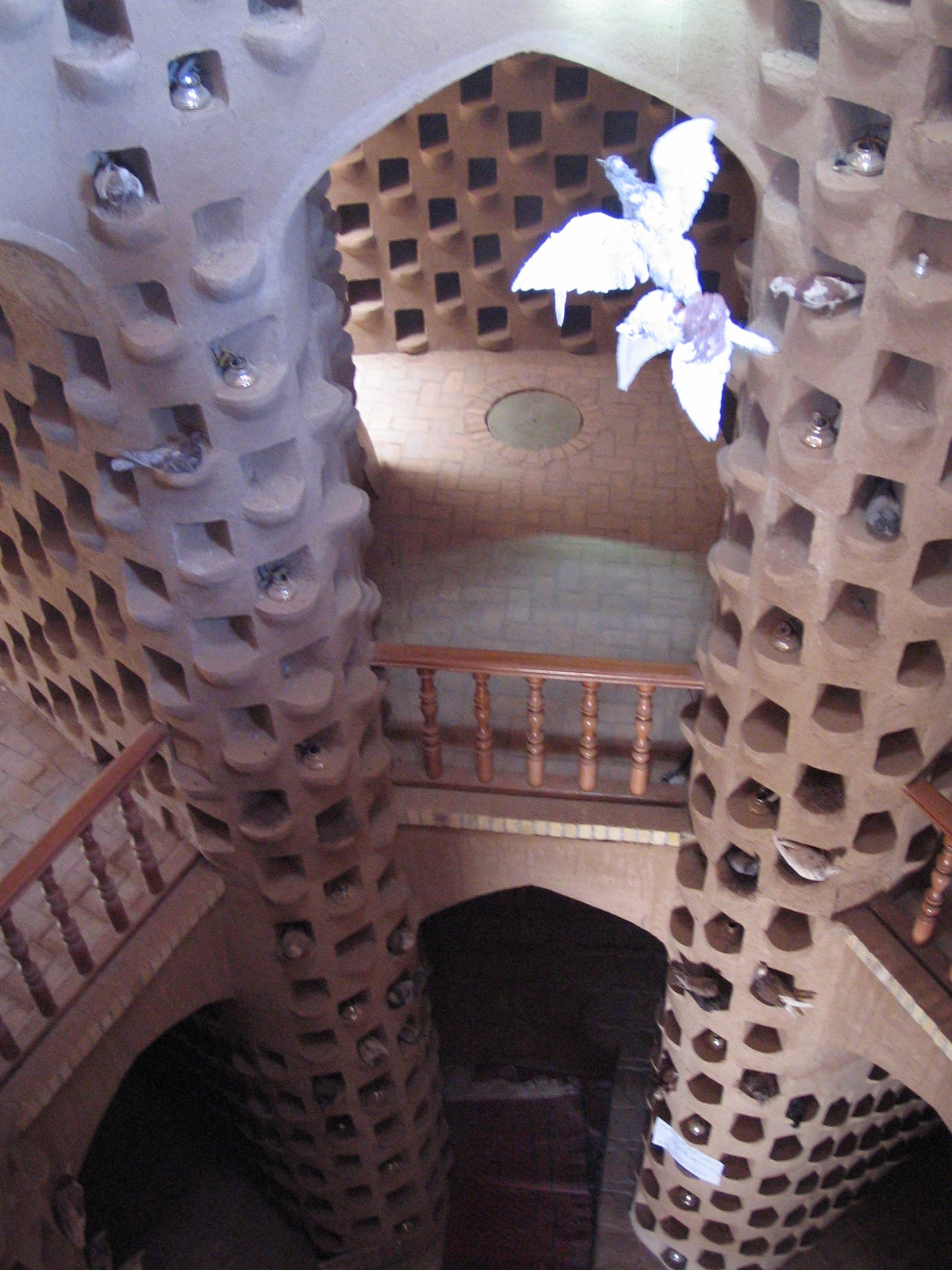
- A large dovecote in Meybod

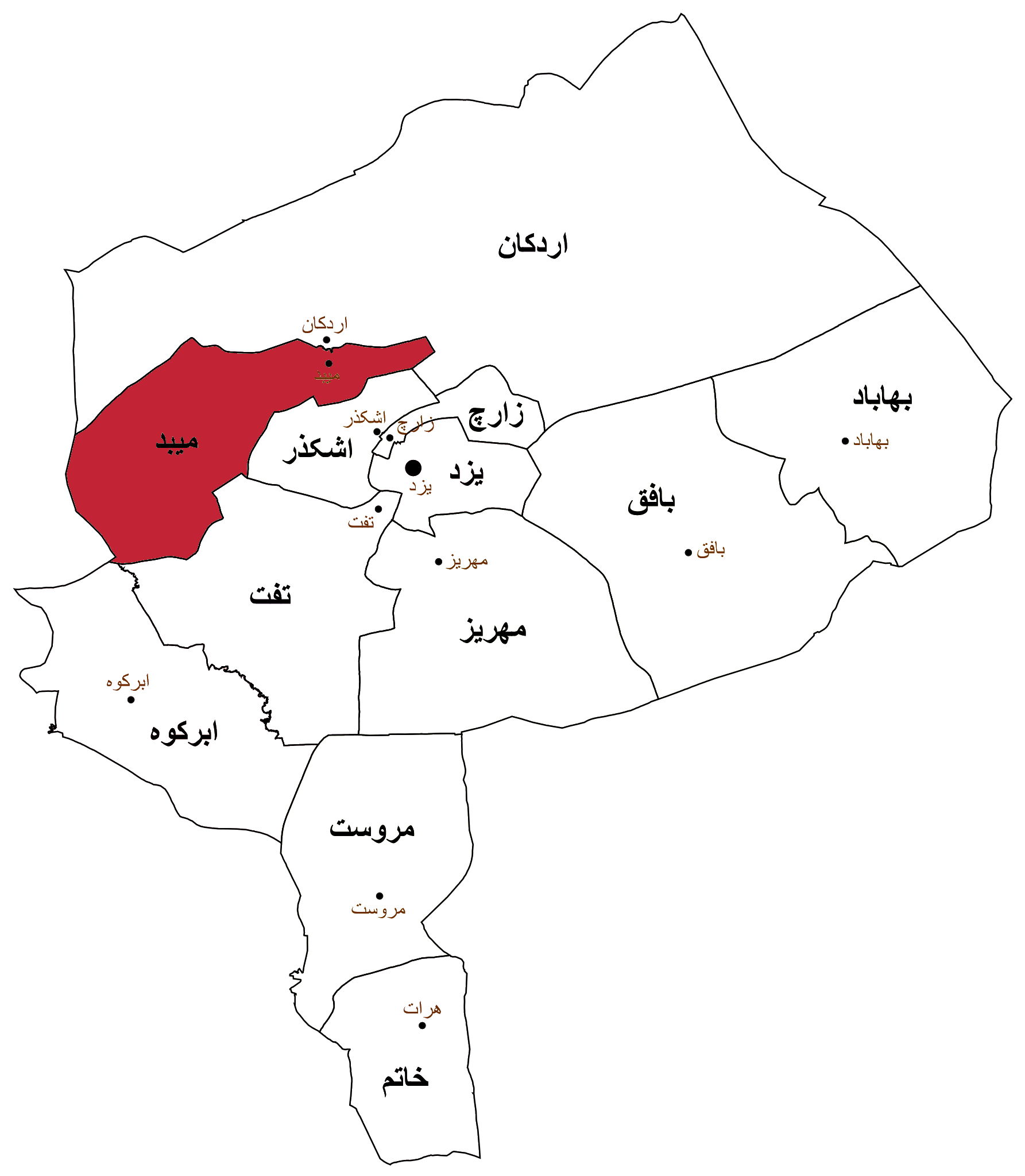
- Location of Meybod County in Yazd province

- Location of Yazd province in Iran
- Coordinates: 32°00′N 53°35′E
- Country: Iran
- Province: Yazd
- Capital: Meybod
- Districts: Central, Bafruiyeh, Nadushan

Population (2016)
  - Total: 99,727
- Time zone: UTC+3:30 (IRST)

Meybod County (Persian: شهرستان میبد) is in Yazd province, Iran. Its capital is the city of Meybod.

== History ==
After the 2006 National Census, the village of Bafruiyeh was elevated to the status of a city. After the 2016 census, Nadushan Rural District and the city of Nadushan were separated from Khezrabad District of Ashkezar County to join Meybod County as Nadushan District, including the new Sadrabad Rural District. At the same time, Bafruiyeh Rural District and the city of Bafruiyeh were separated from the Central District in the formation of Bafruiyeh District, including the new Surk Rural District. (Note: Renamed Dareyn Rural District)

== Demographics ==
=== Population ===
At the time of the 2006 census, the county's population was 70,728 in 19,076 households. The following census in 2011 counted 82,840 people in 23,300 households. The 2016 census measured the population of the county as 99,727 in 29,684 households.

=== Administrative divisions ===
Meybod County's population history and administrative structure over three consecutive censuses are shown in the following table.

Meybod County Population
Administrative Divisions	2006	2011	2016
Central District	70,728	82,840	85,771
Bafruiyeh RD	8,399	3,866	
Shohada RD (Note: Formerly Shahidiyeh Rural District)	4,034	5,581	5,059
Bafruiyeh (city)		6,486	
Meybod (city)	58,295	66,907	80,712
Bafruiyeh District			10,837
Bafruiyeh RD			3,197
Dareyn RD (Note: Formerly Surk Rural District)			701
Bafruiyeh (city)			6,939
Nadushan District			3,119
Nadushan RD (Note: Transferred from Ashkezar County)			216
Sadrabad RD			552
Nadushan (city)			2,351
Total	70,728	82,840	99,727
RD = Rural District

== See also ==
Media related to Meybod County at Wikimedia Commons
