= Huk, South Khorasan =

Village in South Khorasan province, Iran

Huk Persian: هوك
- Village
- Location within Iran
- Coordinates: 34°42′44″N 57°18′55″E
- Country: Iran
- Province: South Khorasan
- County: Eshqabad
- District: Kuh Yakhab
- Rural District: Chah Mosafer

Population (2016)
  - Total: 32
- Time zone: UTC+3:30 (IRST)

Huk (Persian: هوك) (Note: Also romanized as Hūk) is a village in Chah Mosafer Rural District of Kuh Yakhab District in Eshqabad County, South Khorasan province.

== Demographics ==
=== Population ===
At the time of the 2006 National Census, the village's population was 75 in 22 households, when it was in Kuh Yakhab Rural District of Dastgerdan District (Note: Renamed the Central District of Eshqabad County) in Tabas County, Yazd province. The following census in 2011 counted 63 people in 17 households. The 2016 census measured the population of the village as 32 people in seven households, by which time the county had been separated from the province to join South Khorasan province.

In 2024, the district was separated from the county in the establishment of Eshqabad County and renamed the Central District. The rural district was transferred to the new Kuh Yakhab District, and Huk was transferred to Chah Mosafer Rural District created in the same district.
