= Howz-e Zireh =

Village in South Khorasan province, Iran

Howz-e Zireh Persian: حوض زيره
- Village
- Location within Iran
- Coordinates: 34°42′24″N 57°24′05″E
- Country: Iran
- Province: South Khorasan
- County: Eshqabad
- District: Kuh Yakhab
- Rural District: Chah Mosafer

Population (2016)
  - Total: 27
- Time zone: UTC+3:30 (IRST)

Howz-e Zireh (Persian: حوض زيره) (Note: Also romanized as Ḩowẕ-e Zīreh) is a village in Chah Mosafer Rural District of Kuh Yakhab District in Eshqabad County, South Khorasan province.

== Demographics ==
=== Population ===
At the time of the 2006 National Census, the village's population was 86 in 18 households, when it was in Kuh Yakhab Rural District of Dastgerdan District (Note: Renamed the Central District of Eshqabad County) in Tabas County, Yazd province. The village did not appear in the following census of 2011. The 2016 census measured the population of the village as 27 people in eight households, by which time the county had been separated from the province to join South Khorasan province.

In 2024, the district was separated from the county in the establishment of Eshqabad County and renamed the Central District. The rural district was transferred to the new Kuh Yakhab District, and Howz-e Zireh was transferred to Chah Mosafer Rural District created in the same district.
