= Chah-e Shur, Eshqabad =

Village in South Khorasan province, Iran

Chah-e Shur Persian: چاه شور
- Village
- Location within Iran
- Coordinates: 34°33′32″N 57°15′12″E
- Country: Iran
- Province: South Khorasan
- County: Eshqabad
- District: Kuh Yakhab
- Rural District: Chah Mosafer

Population (2016)
  - Total: 52
- Time zone: UTC+3:30 (IRST)

Chah-e Shur (Persian: چاه شور) (Note: Also romanized as Chāh-e Shūr) is a village in Chah Mosafer Rural District of Kuh Yakhab District in Eshqabad County, South Khorasan province.

== Demographics ==
=== Population ===
At the time of the 2006 National Census, the village's population was 90 in 25 households, when it was in Kuh Yakhab Rural District of Dastgerdan District (Note: Renamed the Central District of Eshqabad County) in Tabas County, Yazd province. The following census in 2011 counted 81 people in 21 households. The 2016 census measured the population of the village as 52 people in 15 households, by which time the county had been separated from the province to join South Khorasan province.

In 2024, the district was separated from the county in the establishment of Eshqabad County and renamed the Central District. The rural district was transferred to the new Kuh Yakhab District, and Chah-e Shur was transferred to Chah Mosafer Rural District created in the same district.
