= Kal-e Abdol Ghani =

Village in South Khorasan province, Iran

Kal-e Abdol Ghani Persian: كال عبدالغني
- Village
- Location within Iran
- Country: Iran
- Province: South Khorasan
- County: Eshqabad
- District: Kuh Yakhab
- Rural District: Chah Mosafer

Population (2016)
  - Total: 39
- Time zone: UTC+3:30 (IRST)

Kal-e Abdol Ghani (Persian: كال عبدالغني) (Note: Also romanized as Kāl-e ‘Abdol Ghanī) is a village in Chah Mosafer Rural District of Kuh Yakhab District in Eshqabad County, South Khorasan province.

== Demographics ==
=== Population ===
At the time of the 2006 National Census, the village's population was 63 in 17 households, when it was in Kuh Yakhab Rural District of Dastgerdan District (Note: Renamed the Central District of Eshqabad County) in Tabas County, Yazd province. The village did not appear in the following census of 2011. The 2016 census measured the population of the village as 39 people in 13 households, by which time the county had been separated from the province to join South Khorasan province.

In 2024, the district was separated from the county in the establishment of Eshqabad County and renamed the Central District. The rural district was transferred to the new Kuh Yakhab District, and Kal-e Abdol Ghani was transferred to Chah Mosafer Rural District created in the same district.
