= Chah Mosafer =

Village in South Khorasan province, Iran

Chah Mosafer Persian: چاه مسافر
- Village
- Location within Iran
- Coordinates: 34°37′04″N 57°24′57″E
- Country: Iran
- Province: South Khorasan
- County: Eshqabad
- District: Kuh Yakhab
- Rural District: Chah Mosafer

Population (2016)
  - Total: 122
- Time zone: UTC+3:30 (IRST)

Chah Mosafer (Persian: چاه مسافر) is a village in, and the capital of, Chah Mosafer Rural District in Kuh Yakhab District of Eshqabad County, South Khorasan province.

== Demographics ==
=== Population ===
At the time of the 2006 National Census, the village's population was 160 in 47 households, when it was in Kuh Yakhab Rural District of Dastgerdan District (Note: Renamed the Central District of Eshqabad County) in Tabas County, Yazd province. The following census in 2011 counted 130 people in 37 households. The 2016 census measured the population of the village as 122 people in 35 households, by which time the county had been separated from the province to join South Khorasan province.

In 2024, the district was separated from the county in the establishment of Eshqabad County and renamed the Central District. The rural district was transferred to the new Kuh Yakhab District, and Chah Mosafer was transferred to Chah Mosafer Rural District created in the same district.
