= Dalakuk =

Village in South Khorasan province, Iran

Dalakuk Persian: دلاکوک
- Village
- Location within Iran
- Coordinates: 34°13′33″N 57°00′13″E
- Country: Iran
- Province: South Khorasan
- County: Eshqabad
- District: Central
- Rural District: Deh-e Mohammad

Population (2016)
  - Total: 61
- Time zone: UTC+3:30 (IRST)

Dalakuk (Persian: دلاکوک) (Note: Also romanized as Dalakūk; also known as Dalaku, Dalakū, and Dalakūh) is a village in Deh-e Mohammad Rural District of the Central District (Note: Formerly Dastgardan District of Tabas County) in Eshqabad County, South Khorasan province, Iran.

== Demographics ==
=== Population ===
At the time of the 2006 National Census, the village's population, as Dalaku, was 17 in five households, when it was in Dastgerdan Rural District of Dastgardan District (Note: Renamed the Central District of Eshqabad County) in Tabas County, Yazd province. The following census in 2011 counted 35 people in 12 households, by which time the village was listed as Dalakuk. The 2016 census measured the population of the village as 61 people in 21 households, when the county had been separated from the province to join South Khorasan province.

In 2024, the district was separated from the county in the establishment of Eshqabad County and renamed the Central District. Dalakuk was transferred to Deh-e Mohammad Rural District created in the same district.
