= Deh-e Mohammad =

Village in South Khorasan province, Iran

Deh-e Mohammad Persian: ده محمد
- Village
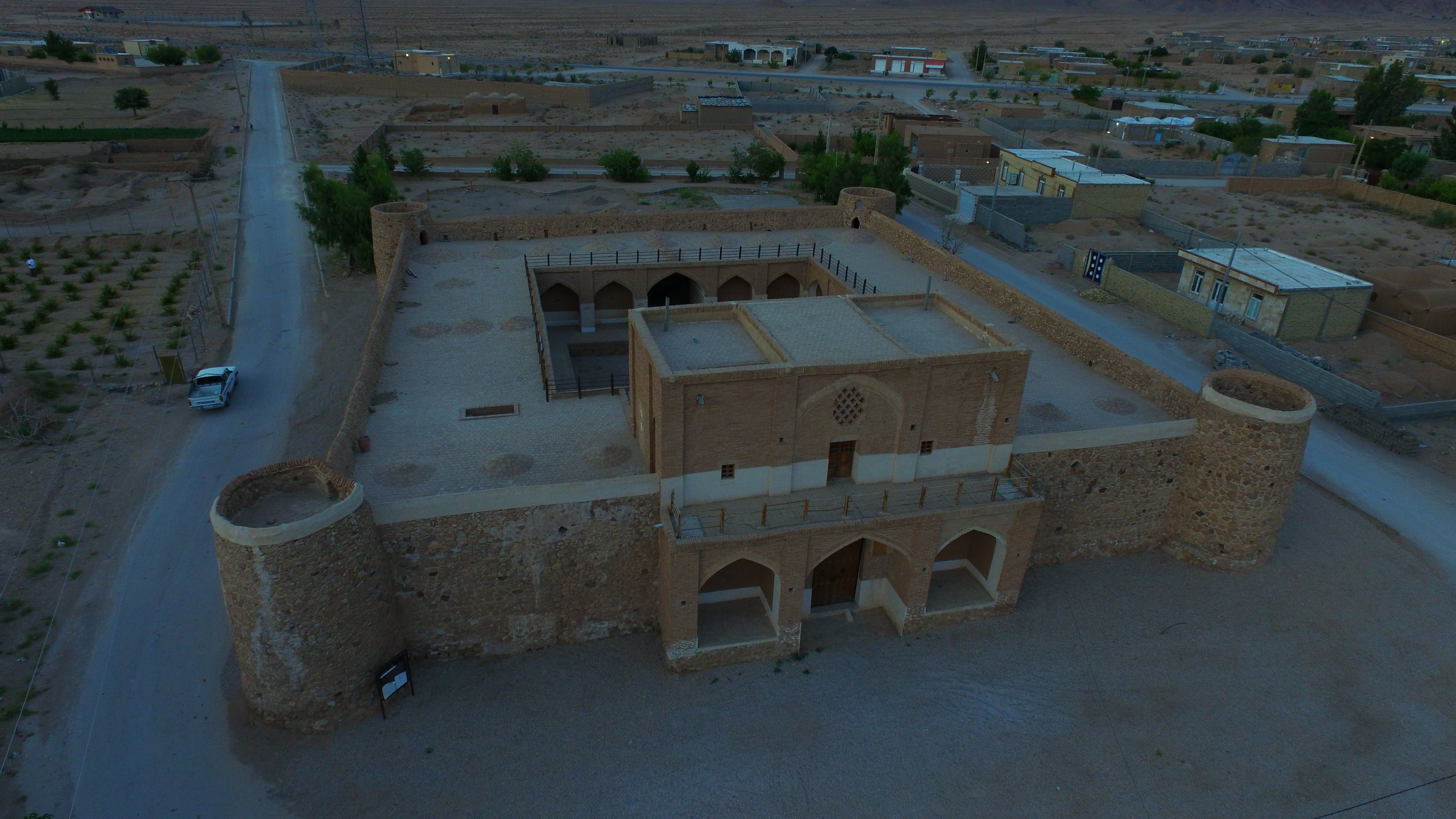
- The village of Deh-e Mohammad

- Location within Iran
- Coordinates: 33°59′26″N 56°58′53″E
- Country: Iran
- Province: South Khorasan
- County: Eshqabad
- District: Central
- Rural District: Deh-e Mohammad

Population (2016)
  - Total: 368
- Time zone: UTC+3:30 (IRST)

Deh-e Mohammad (Persian: ده محمد) (Note: Also romanized as Deh Mohammad and Deh-e Moḩammad; also known as Deh-i-Muhammad) is a village in, and the capital of, Deh-e Mohammad Rural District in the Central District (Note: Formerly Dastgardan District of Tabas County) of Eshqabad County, South Khorasan province, Iran.

== Demographics ==
=== Population ===
At the time of the 2006 National Census, the village's population was 374 in 116 households, when it was in Dastgerdan Rural District of Dastgardan District (Note: Renamed the Central District of Eshqabad County) in Tabas County, Yazd province. The following census in 2011 counted 389 people in 127 households. The 2016 census measured the population of the village as 368 people in 126 households, by which time the county had been separated from the province to join South Khorasan province.

In 2024, the district was separated from the county in the establishment of Eshqabad County and renamed the Central District. Deh-e Mohammad was transferred to Deh-e Mohammad Rural District created in the same district.
