= Malvand, South Khorasan =

Village in South Khorasan province, Iran

Malvand Persian: ملوند
- Village
- Location within Iran
- Coordinates: 33°55′38″N 57°01′58″E
- Country: Iran
- Province: South Khorasan
- County: Eshqabad
- District: Central
- Rural District: Deh-e Mohammad

Population (2016)
  - Total: 244
- Time zone: UTC+3:30 (IRST)

Malvand (Persian: ملوند) is a village in Deh-e Mohammad Rural District of the Central District (Note: Formerly Dastgardan District of Tabas County) in Eshqabad County, South Khorasan province, Iran.

== Demographics ==
=== Population ===
At the time of the 2006 National Census, the village's population was 254 in 82 households, when it was in Dastgerdan Rural District of Dastgardan District (Note: Renamed the Central District of Eshqabad County) in Tabas County, Yazd province. The following census in 2011 counted 253 people in 83 households. The 2016 census measured the population of the village as 244 people in 85 households, by which time the county had been separated from the province to join South Khorasan province.

In 2024, the district was separated from the county in the establishment of Eshqabad County and renamed the Central District. Malvand was transferred to Deh-e Mohammad Rural District created in the same district.
