= Ebrahimabad-e Bala =

Neighborhood in South Khorasan province, Iran

Ebrahimabad-e Bala Persian: ابراهيم ابادبالا
- Neighborhood
- Location within Iran
- Coordinates: 33°26′31″N 56°57′53″E
- Country: Iran
- Province: South Khorasan
- County: Tabas
- District: Central
- Rural District: Nakhlestan
- Village: Korit

Population (2006)
  - Total: 187
- Time zone: UTC+3:30 (IRST)

Ebrahimabad-e Bala (Persian: ابراهيم ابادبالا) (Note: Also romanized as Ebrāhīmābād-e Bālā; also known as Korīt-e Bālā) is a neighborhood in the village of Korit in Nakhlestan Rural District of the Central District in Tabas County, South Khorasan province, Iran.

== Demographics ==
=== Population ===
At the time of the 2006 National Census, Ebrahimabad-e Bala's population was 187 in 47 households, when it was a village in Yazd province. After the census, the village was annexed by the village of Korit and did not appear in the following census of 2011. In 2013 the county was separated from the province to join South Khorasan province.
