= Zabar Kuh =

Village in South Khorasan province, Iran

Zabar Kuh Persian: زبركوه
- Village
- Location within Iran
- Coordinates: 34°53′35″N 57°26′07″E
- Country: Iran
- Province: South Khorasan
- County: Eshqabad
- District: Kuh Yakhab
- Rural District: Kuh Yakhab

Population (2016)
  - Total: 89
- Time zone: UTC+3:30 (IRST)

Zabar Kuh (Persian: زبركوه) (Note: Also romanized as Zabar Kūh; also known as Zir Kooh and Zīr Kūh) is a village in Kuh Yakhab Rural District of Kuh Yakhab District in Eshqabad County, South Khorasan province, Iran.

== Demographics ==
=== Population ===
At the time of the 2006 National Census, the village's population was 67 in 21 households, when it was in Dastgerdan District (Note: Renamed the Central District of Eshqabad County) of Tabas County, Yazd province. The following census in 2011 counted 77 people in 23 households. The 2016 census measured the population of the village as 89 people in 27 households, by which time the county had been separated from the province to join South Khorasan province.

In 2024, the district was separated from the county in the establishment of Eshqabad County and renamed the Central District. The rural district was transferred to the new Kuh Yakhab District.
