= Yakhab =

Village in South Khorasan province, Iran

Yakhab Persian: يخاب
- Village
- Location within Iran
- Coordinates: 34°51′10″N 57°16′49″E
- Country: Iran
- Province: South Khorasan
- County: Eshqabad
- District: Kuh Yakhab
- Rural District: Kuh Yakhab

Population (2016)
  - Total: 185
- Time zone: UTC+3:30 (IRST)

Yakhab (Persian: يخاب) (Note: Also romanized as Yakhāb) is a village in, and the capital of, Kuh Yakhab Rural District in Kuh Yakhab District of Eshqabad County, South Khorasan province, Iran. The previous capital of the rural district was the village of Tappeh Taq.

== Demographics ==
=== Population ===
At the time of the 2006 National Census, the village's population was 198 in 45 households, when it was in Dastgerdan District (Note: Renamed the Central District of Eshqabad County) of Tabas County, Yazd province. The following census in 2011 counted 174 people in 41 households. The 2016 census measured the population of the village as 185 people in 47 households, by which time the county had been separated from the province to join South Khorasan province.

In 2024, the district was separated from the county in the establishment of Eshqabad County and renamed the Central District. The rural district was transferred to the new Kuh Yakhab District.
