= Chah Balu =

Village in South Khorasan province, Iran

Chah Balu Persian: چاه بلو
- Village
- Location within Iran
- Coordinates: 34°56′15″N 57°24′06″E
- Country: Iran
- Province: South Khorasan
- County: Eshqabad
- District: Kuh Yakhab
- Rural District: Kuh Yakhab

Population (2016)
  - Total: 56
- Time zone: UTC+3:30 (IRST)

Chah Balu (Persian: چاه بلو) (Note: Also romanized as Chāh Balū) is a village in Kuh Yakhab Rural District of Kuh Yakhab District in Eshqabad County, South Khorasan province, Iran.

== Demographics ==
=== Population ===
At the time of the 2006 National Census, the village's population was 47 in 12 households, when it was in Dastgerdan District (Note: Renamed the Central District of Eshqabad County) of Tabas County, Yazd province. The following census in 2011 counted 69 people in 20 households. The 2016 census measured the population of the village as 56 people in 17 households, by which time the county had been separated from the province to join South Khorasan province.

In 2024, the district was separated from the county in the establishment of Eshqabad County and renamed the Central District. The rural district was transferred to the new Kuh Yakhab District.
