= Pashneh Daran =

Village in South Khorasan province, Iran

Pashneh Daran Persian: پاشنه دران
- Village
- Location within Iran
- Coordinates: 34°10′53″N 56°58′34″E
- Country: Iran
- Province: South Khorasan
- County: Eshqabad
- District: Central
- Rural District: Deh-e Mohammad

Population (2016)
  - Total: 35
- Time zone: UTC+3:30 (IRST)

Pashneh Daran (Persian: پاشنه دران) (Note: Also romanized as Pāshneh Dārān; also known as Pāshneh Dar, Pāshneh Darū, Pāshteh Dar (پاشنه در), and Pāshteh Darān) is a village in Deh-e Mohammad Rural District of the Central District (Note: Formerly Dastgardan District of Tabas County) in Eshqabad County, South Khorasan province, Iran.

== Demographics ==
=== Population ===
At the time of the 2006 National Census, the village's population was 23 in eight households, when it was in Dastgerdan Rural District of Dastgardan District (Note: Renamed the Central District of Eshqabad County) in Tabas County, Yazd province. The following census in 2011 counted 23 people in six households. The 2016 census measured the population of the village as 35 people in 11 households, by which time the county had been separated from the province to join South Khorasan province.

In 2024, the district was separated from the county in the establishment of Eshqabad County and renamed the Central District. Pashneh Daran was transferred to Deh-e Mohammad Rural District created in the same district.
