= Gusheh Kamar =

Village in South Khorasan province, Iran

Gusheh Kamar Persian: گوشه كمر
- Village
- Location within Iran
- Coordinates: 34°37′43″N 57°10′45″E
- Country: Iran
- Province: South Khorasan
- County: Eshqabad
- District: Kuh Yakhab
- Rural District: Kuh Yakhab

Population (2016)
  - Total: 20
- Time zone: UTC+3:30 (IRST)

Gusheh Kamar (Persian: گوشه كمر) (Note: Also romanized as Gūsheh Kamar; also known as Gūsh Kamar) is a village in Kuh Yakhab Rural District of Kuh Yakhab District in Eshqabad County, South Khorasan province, Iran.

== Demographics ==
=== Population ===
At the time of the 2006 National Census, the village's population was 23 in six households, when it was in Dastgerdan District (Note: Renamed the Central District of Eshqabad County) of Tabas County, Yazd province. The village did not appear in the following census of 2011. The 2016 census measured the population of the village as 20 people in eight households, by which time the county had been separated from the province to join South Khorasan province.

In 2024, the district was separated from the county in the establishment of Eshqabad County and renamed the Central District. The rural district was transferred to the new Kuh Yakhab District.
