= Mansuriyeh, South Khorasan =

Village in South Khorasan province, Iran

Mansuriyeh Persian: منصوريه
- Village
- Location within Iran
- Coordinates: 34°13′54″N 56°56′41″E
- Country: Iran
- Province: South Khorasan
- County: Eshqabad
- District: Central
- Rural District: Deh-e Mohammad

Population (2016)
  - Total: 47
- Time zone: UTC+3:30 (IRST)

Mansuriyeh (Persian: منصوريه) (Note: Also romanized as Manşūrīyeh and Manşuryeh) is a village in Deh-e Mohammad Rural District of the Central District (Note: Formerly Dastgardan District of Tabas County) in Eshqabad County, South Khorasan province, Iran.

== Demographics ==
=== Population ===
At the time of the 2006 National Census, the village's population was 76 in 23 households, when it was in Dastgerdan Rural District of Dastgardan District (Note: Renamed the Central District of Eshqabad County) in Tabas County, Yazd province. The following census in 2011 counted 58 people in 22 households. The 2016 census measured the population of the village as 47 people in 22 households, by which time the county had been separated from the province to join South Khorasan province.

In 2024, the district was separated from the county in the establishment of Eshqabad County and renamed the Central District. Mansuriyeh was transferred to Deh-e Mohammad Rural District created in the same district.
