= Gazu, South Khorasan =

Village in South Khorasan province, Iran

Gazu Persian: گزو
- Village
- Location within Iran
- Coordinates: 34°40′01″N 57°16′00″E
- Country: Iran
- Province: South Khorasan
- County: Eshqabad
- District: Kuh Yakhab
- Rural District: Kuh Yakhab

Population (2016)
  - Total: 21
- Time zone: UTC+3:30 (IRST)

Gazu (Persian: گزو) (Note: Also romanized as Gazū) is a village in Kuh Yakhab Rural District of Kuh Yakhab District in Eshqabad County, South Khorasan province, Iran.

== Demographics ==
=== Population ===
The village did not appear in the 2006 and 2011 National Censuses, when it was in Dastgerdan District (Note: Renamed the Central District of Eshqabad County) of Tabas County, Yazd province. The 2016 census measured the population of the village as 21 people in five households, by which time the county had been separated from the province to join South Khorasan province.

In 2024, the district was separated from the county in the establishment of Eshqabad County and renamed the Central District. The rural district was transferred to the new Kuh Yakhab District.
