= Senjedu, South Khorasan =

Village in South Khorasan province, Iran

Senjedu Persian: سنجدو
- Village
- Location within Iran
- Coordinates: 34°52′36″N 57°16′40″E
- Country: Iran
- Province: South Khorasan
- County: Eshqabad
- District: Kuh Yakhab
- Rural District: Kuh Yakhab

Population (2016)
  - Total: 57
- Time zone: UTC+3:30 (IRST)

Senjedu (Persian: سنجدو) (Note: Also romanized as Senjedū) is a village in Kuh Yakhab Rural District of Kuh Yakhab District in Eshqabad County, South Khorasan province, Iran.

== Demographics ==
=== Population ===
At the time of the 2006 National Census, the village's population was 39 in 20 households, when it was in Dastgerdan District (Note: Renamed the Central District of Eshqabad County) of Tabas County, Yazd province. The following census in 2011 counted 31 people in 12 households. The 2016 census measured the population of the village as 57 people in 19 households, by which time the county had been separated from the province to join South Khorasan province.

In 2024, the district was separated from the county in the establishment of Eshqabad County and renamed the Central District. The rural district was transferred to the new Kuh Yakhab District.
