= Padeh-ye Bid =

Village in South Khorasan province, Iran

Padeh-ye Bid Persian: پده بيد
- Village
- Location within Iran
- Coordinates: 34°55′35″N 57°30′11″E
- Country: Iran
- Province: South Khorasan
- County: Eshqabad
- District: Kuh Yakhab
- Rural District: Kuh Yakhab

Population (2016)
  - Total: 142
- Time zone: UTC+3:30 (IRST)

Padeh-ye Bid (Persian: پده بيد) (Note: Also romanized as Padeh-ye Bīd) is a village in Kuh Yakhab Rural District of Kuh Yakhab District in Eshqabad County, South Khorasan province, Iran.

== Demographics ==
=== Population ===
At the time of the 2006 National Census, the village's population was 187 in 34 households, when it was in Dastgerdan District (Note: Renamed the Central District of Eshqabad County) of Tabas County, Yazd province. The following census in 2011 counted 145 people in 35 households. The 2016 census measured the population of the village as 142 people in 41 households, by which time the county had been separated from the province to join South Khorasan province.

In 2024, the district was separated from the county in the establishment of Eshqabad County and renamed the Central District. The rural district was transferred to the new Kuh Yakhab District.
