= Hasanabad-e Etemad =

Village in South Khorasan province, Iran

Hasanabad-e Etemad Persian: حسن اباداعتماد
- Village
- Location within Iran
- Coordinates: 34°11′34″N 56°57′03″E
- Country: Iran
- Province: South Khorasan
- County: Eshqabad
- District: Central
- Rural District: Deh-e Mohammad

Population (2016)
  - Total: 40
- Time zone: UTC+3:30 (IRST)

Hasanabad-e Etemad (Persian: حسن اباداعتماد) (Note: Also romanized as Ḩasanābād-e E‘temād; also known as Ḩasanābād (حسن اباد)) is a village in Deh-e Mohammad Rural District of the Central District (Note: Formerly Dastgardan District of Tabas County) in Eshqabad County, South Khorasan province, Iran.

== Demographics ==
=== Population ===
At the time of the 2006 National Census, the village's population was 61 in 13 households, when it was in Dastgerdan Rural District of Dastgardan District (Note: Renamed the Central District of Eshqabad County) in Tabas County, Yazd province. The following census in 2011 counted 24 people in nine households. The 2016 census measured the population of the village as 40 people in 17 households, by which time the county had been separated from the province to join South Khorasan province.

In 2024, the district was separated from the county in the establishment of Eshqabad County and renamed the Central District. Hasanabad-e Etemad was transferred to Deh-e Mohammad Rural District created in the same district.
