= Ozbekuy-e Jadid =

Village in South Khorasan province, Iran

Ozbekuy-e Jadid Persian: ازبكوي جديد
- Village
- Location within Iran
- Coordinates: 34°41′46″N 57°07′32″E
- Country: Iran
- Province: South Khorasan
- County: Eshqabad
- District: Kuh Yakhab
- Rural District: Kuh Yakhab

Population (2016)
  - Total: 83
- Time zone: UTC+3:30 (IRST)

Ozbekuy-e Jadid (Persian: ازبكوي جديد) (Note: Also romanized as Ozbekūy-e Jadīd; also known as Osbak Kūh, Ozbagū, Ozbagū-ye Jadīd, Ozbak Kūh, Ozbakū-ye Jadīd, and Usbeg Kūh) is a village in Kuh Yakhab Rural District of Kuh Yakhab District in Eshqabad County, South Khorasan province, Iran.

== Demographics ==
=== Population ===
At the time of the 2006 National Census, the village's population was 96 in 27 households, when it was in Dastgerdan District (Note: Renamed the Central District of Eshqabad County) of Tabas County, Yazd province. The following census in 2011 counted 82 people in 26 households. The 2016 census measured the population of the village as 83 people in 27 households, by which time the county had been separated from the province to join South Khorasan province.

In 2024, the district was separated from the county in the establishment of Eshqabad County and renamed the Central District. The rural district was transferred to the new Kuh Yakhab District.
