= Hudar, South Khorasan =

Village in South Khorasan province, Iran

Hudar Persian: هودر
- Village
- Location within Iran
- Coordinates: 34°18′35″N 56°54′18″E
- Country: Iran
- Province: South Khorasan
- County: Eshqabad
- District: Central
- Rural District: Dastgerdan

Population (2016)
  - Total: 443
- Time zone: UTC+3:30 (IRST)

Hudar (Persian: هودر) (Note: Also romanized as Hūdar) is a village in, and the capital of, Dastgerdan Rural District in the Central District (Note: Formerly Dastgerdan District of Tabas County) of Eshqabad County, South Khorasan province, Iran. The rural district was previously administered from the city of Eshqabad.

== Demographics ==
=== Population ===
At the time of the 2006 National Census, the village's population was 484 in 126 households, when it was in Dastgerdan District (Note: Renamed the Central District of Eshqabad County) of Tabas County, Yazd province. The following census in 2011 counted 436 people in 136 households. The 2016 census measured the population of the village as 443 people in 148 households, by which time the county had been separated from the province to join South Khorasan province. It was the most populous village in its rural district.

In 2024, the district was separated from the county in the establishment of Eshqabad County and renamed the Central District.
