= Dastgerdan, South Khorasan =

Village in South Khorasan province, Iran

Dastgerdan Persian: دستگردان
- Village
- Location within Iran
- Coordinates: 34°18′24″N 56°55′31″E
- Country: Iran
- Province: South Khorasan
- County: Eshqabad
- District: Central
- Rural District: Dastgerdan

Population (2016)
  - Total: 234
- Time zone: UTC+3:30 (IRST)

Dastgerdan (Persian: دستگردان) (Note: Also romanized as Dastgardān and Dastgerdān; also known as Dastgardūn) is a village in Dastgerdan Rural District of the Central District (Note: Formerly Dastgerdan District of Tabas County) in Eshqabad County, South Khorasan province, Iran.

== Demographics ==
=== Population ===
At the time of the 2006 National Census, the village's population was 249 in 66 households, when it was in Dastgerdan District (Note: Renamed the Central District of Eshqabad County) of Tabas County, Yazd province. The following census in 2011 counted 233 people in 71 households. The 2016 census measured the population of the village as 234 people in 78 households, by which time the county had been separated from the province to join South Khorasan province.

In 2024, the district was separated from the county in the establishment of Eshqabad County and renamed the Central District.
