= Aliabad-e Chah Kavir =

Village in South Khorasan province, Iran

Aliabad-e Chah Kavir Persian: علي ابادچاه كوير
- Village
- Location within Iran
- Coordinates: 34°27′20″N 56°57′07″E
- Country: Iran
- Province: South Khorasan
- County: Eshqabad
- District: Central
- Rural District: Dastgerdan

Population (2016)
  - Total: 37
- Time zone: UTC+3:30 (IRST)

Aliabad-e Chah Kavir (Persian: علي ابادچاه كوير) (Note: Also romanized as ‘Alīābād-e Chāh Kavīr; also known as ‘Alīābād) is a village in Dastgerdan Rural District of the Central District (Note: Formerly Dastgerdan District of Tabas County) in Eshqabad County, South Khorasan province, Iran.

== Demographics ==
=== Population ===
At the time of the 2006 National Census, the village's population was 24 in eight households, when it was in Dastgerdan District (Note: Renamed the Central District of Eshqabad County) of Tabas County, Yazd province. The following census in 2011 counted 25 people in nine households. The 2016 census measured the population of the village as 37 people in 12 households, by which time the county had been separated from the province to join South Khorasan province.

In 2024, the district was separated from the county in the establishment of Eshqabad County and renamed the Central District.
