= Heydariyeh =

Village in South Khorasan province, Iran

Heydariyeh Persian: حيدريه
- Village
- Location within Iran
- Coordinates: 34°22′46″N 56°57′49″E
- Country: Iran
- Province: South Khorasan
- County: Eshqabad
- District: Central
- Rural District: Dastgerdan

Population (2016)
  - Total: 25
- Time zone: UTC+3:30 (IRST)

Heydariyeh (Persian: حيدريه) (Note: Also romanized as Ḩeydarīyeh; also known as Dalākābād) is a village in Dastgerdan Rural District of the Central District (Note: Formerly Dastgerdan District of Tabas County) in Eshqabad County, South Khorasan province, Iran.

== Demographics ==
=== Population ===
At the time of the 2006 National Census, the village's population was 28 in six households, when it was in Dastgerdan District (Note: Renamed the Central District of Eshqabad County) of Tabas County, Yazd province. The following census in 2011 counted 31 people in seven households. The 2016 census measured the population of the village as 25 people in seven households, by which time the county had been separated from the province to join South Khorasan province.

In 2024, the district was separated from the county in the establishment of Eshqabad County and renamed the Central District.

== Geography ==
Heydariyeh is located in northeastern Iran, east of the country's capital, Tehran, near the border with Afghanistan.
