= Samba, Iran =

Village in South Khorasan province, Iran

Samba Persian: سمبا
- Village
- Location within Iran
- Coordinates: 34°56′27″N 57°17′22″E
- Country: Iran
- Province: South Khorasan
- County: Eshqabad
- District: Kuh Yakhab
- Rural District: Kuh Yakhab

Population (2016)
  - Total: 124
- Time zone: UTC+3:30 (IRST)

Samba (Persian: سمبا) (Note: Also romanized as Sambā and Sombā) is a village in Kuh Yakhab Rural District of Kuh Yakhab District in Eshqabad County, South Khorasan province, Iran.

== Demographics ==
=== Population ===
At the time of the 2006 National Census, the village's population was 151 in 28 households, when it was in Dastgerdan District (Note: Renamed the Central District of Eshqabad County) of Tabas County, Yazd province. The following census in 2011 counted 149 people in 33 households. The 2016 census measured the population of the village as 124 people in 31 households, by which time the county had been separated from the province to join South Khorasan province.

In 2024, the district was separated from the county in the establishment of Eshqabad County and renamed the Central District. The rural district was transferred to the new Kuh Yakhab District.
