= Razaviyeh-ye Abkhvorak =

Village in South Khorasan province, Iran

Razaviyeh-ye Abkhvorak Persian: رضویه آبخورک
- Village
- Location within Iran
- Coordinates: 34°19′34″N 57°07′03″E
- Country: Iran
- Province: South Khorasan
- County: Eshqabad
- District: Central
- Rural District: Dastgerdan

Population (2016)
  - Total: 106
- Time zone: UTC+3:30 (IRST)

Razaviyeh-ye Abkhvorak (Persian: رضویه آبخورک) (Note: Also romanized as Raẕavīyeh-ye Ābkhvorak; also known as Ab Khorak, Ab Khūrak, Āb Khvor, Ābkhowr, Ābkhūr, and Ābkhvorak) is a village in Dastgerdan Rural District of the Central District (Note: Formerly Dastgerdan District of Tabas County) in Eshqabad County, South Khorasan province, Iran.

== Demographics ==
=== Population ===
At the time of the 2006 National Census, the village's population was 202 in 87 households, when it was in Dastgerdan District (Note: Renamed the Central District of Eshqabad County) of Tabas County, Yazd province. The following census in 2011 counted 127 people in 59 households. The 2016 census measured the population of the village as 106 people in 51 households, by which time the county had been separated from the province to join South Khorasan province.

In 2024, the district was separated from the county in the establishment of Eshqabad County and renamed the Central District.
