= Yaqubiyeh =

Village in South Khorasan province, Iran

Yaqubiyeh Persian: يعقوبيه
- Village
- Location within Iran
- Coordinates: 34°28′02″N 56°57′11″E
- Country: Iran
- Province: South Khorasan
- County: Eshqabad
- District: Central
- Rural District: Dastgerdan

Population (2016)
  - Total: Below reporting threshold
- Time zone: UTC+3:30 (IRST)

Yaqubiyeh (Persian: يعقوبيه) (Note: Also romanized as Ya‘qūbīyeh; also known as Ya‘qūbīyeh-ye Chāh Kavīr) is a village in Dastgerdan Rural District of the Central District (Note: Formerly Dastgerdan District of Tabas County) in Eshqabad County, South Khorasan province, Iran.

== Demographics ==
=== Population ===
At the time of the 2006 National Census, the village's population was 39 in 12 households, when it was in Dastgerdan District (Note: Renamed the Central District of Eshqabad County) of Tabas County, Yazd province. The following census in 2011 counted 28 people in seven households. The 2016 census measured the population of the village as below the reporting threshold, by which time the county had been separated from the province to join South Khorasan province.

In 2024, the district was separated from the county in the establishment of Eshqabad County and renamed the Central District.
