= Nejatabad =

Village in South Khorasan province, Iran

Nejatabad Persian: نجات اباد
- Village
- Location within Iran
- Coordinates: 34°22′16″N 56°56′30″E
- Country: Iran
- Province: South Khorasan
- County: Eshqabad
- District: Central
- Rural District: Dastgerdan

Population (2016)
  - Total: 418
- Time zone: UTC+3:30 (IRST)

Nejatabad (Persian: نجات اباد) (Note: Also romanized as Nejātābād) is a village in Dastgerdan Rural District of the Central District (Note: Formerly Dastgerdan District of Tabas County) in Eshqabad County, South Khorasan province, Iran.

== Demographics ==
=== Population ===
At the time of the 2006 National Census, the village's population was 315 in 86 households, when it was in Dastgerdan District (Note: Renamed the Central District of Eshqabad County) of Tabas County, Yazd province. The following census in 2011 counted 448 people in 138 households. The 2016 census measured the population of the village as 418 people in 126 households, by which time the county had been separated from the province to join South Khorasan province.

In 2024, the district was separated from the county in the establishment of Eshqabad County and renamed the Central District.
