= Mohammadabad-e Chah Kavir =

Village in South Khorasan province, Iran

Mohammadabad-e Chah Kavir Persian: محمدابادچاه كوير
- Village
- Location within Iran
- Coordinates: 34°28′29″N 56°57′15″E
- Country: Iran
- Province: South Khorasan
- County: Eshqabad
- District: Central
- Rural District: Dastgerdan

Population (2016)
  - Total: 12
- Time zone: UTC+3:30 (IRST)

Mohammadabad-e Chah Kavir (Persian: محمدابادچاه كوير) (Note: Also Romanized as Moḩammadābād-e Chāh Kavīr and Moḩammadābād Chāh Kavīr; also known as Chāh-e Kavīr and Chāh Kavīr) is a village in Dastgerdan Rural District of the Central District (Note: Formerly Dastgerdan District of Tabas County) in Eshqabad County, South Khorasan province, Iran.

== Demographics ==
=== Population ===
At the time of the 2006 National Census, the village's population was 28 in six households, when it was in Dastgerdan District (Note: Renamed the Central District of Eshqabad County) of Tabas County, Yazd province. The following census in 2011 counted 14 people in five households. The 2016 census measured the population of the village as 12 people in four households, by which time the county had been separated from the province to join South Khorasan province.

In 2024, the district was separated from the county in the establishment of Eshqabad County and renamed the Central District.
