= Deh Now, Dastgerdan =

Village in South Khorasan province, Iran

Deh Now Persian: دهنو
- Village
- Location within Iran
- Coordinates: 34°19′58″N 56°54′03″E
- Country: Iran
- Province: South Khorasan
- County: Eshqabad
- District: Central
- Rural District: Dastgerdan

Population (2016)
  - Total: 90
- Time zone: UTC+3:30 (IRST)

Deh Now (Persian: دهنو) (Note: Also known as Deh Now-ye Tavakkolī (دهنوتوكلي)) is a village in Dastgerdan Rural District of the Central District (Note: Formerly Dastgerdan District of Tabas County) in Eshqabad County, South Khorasan province, Iran.

== Demographics ==
=== Population ===
At the time of the 2006 National Census, the village's population was 22 in six households, when it was in Dastgerdan District (Note: Renamed the Central District of Eshqabad County) of Tabas County, Yazd province. The following census in 2011 counted 74 people in 24 households. The 2016 census measured the population of the village as 90 people in 28 households, by which time the county had been separated from the province to join South Khorasan province.

In 2024, the district was separated from the county in the establishment of Eshqabad County and renamed the Central District.
