= Bozhughar =

Village in South Khorasan province, Iran

Bozhughar Persian: بژوغر
- Village
- Location within Iran
- Coordinates: 34°20′39″N 56°57′50″E
- Country: Iran
- Province: South Khorasan
- County: Eshqabad
- District: Central
- Rural District: Dastgerdan

Population (2016)
  - Total: 91
- Time zone: UTC+3:30 (IRST)

Bozhughar (Persian: بژوغر) (Note: Also romanized as Bozhūghar; also known as Bozhdāghar (بژداغر) and Bozdeghar) is a village in Dastgerdan Rural District of the Central District (Note: Formerly Dastgerdan District of Tabas County) in Eshqabad County, South Khorasan province, Iran.

== Demographics ==
=== Population ===
At the time of the 2006 National Census, the village's population was 91 in 27 households, when it was in Dastgerdan District (Note: Renamed the Central District of Eshqabad County) of Tabas County, Yazd province. The following census in 2011 counted 70 people in 23 households. The 2016 census measured the population of the village as 91 people in 30 households, by which time the county had been separated from the province to join South Khorasan province.

In 2024, the district was separated from the county in the establishment of Eshqabad County and renamed the Central District.
