= Deh Now-e Van =

Village in South Khorasan province, Iran

Deh Now-e Van Persian: دهنوون
- Village
- Location within Iran
- Coordinates: 34°22′13″N 57°07′17″E
- Country: Iran
- Province: South Khorasan
- County: Eshqabad
- District: Central
- Rural District: Dastgerdan

Population (2016)
  - Total: 88
- Time zone: UTC+3:30 (IRST)

Deh Now-e Van (Persian: دهنوون) (Note: Also romanized as Dehnowvan; also known as Deh Now, Deh Now-e Bam, Deh-e Now Bam, Deh-e Now Band, and Deh-i-Nauband) is a village in Dastgerdan Rural District of the Central District (Note: Formerly Dastgerdan District of Tabas County) in Eshqabad County, South Khorasan province, Iran.

== Demographics ==
=== Population ===
At the time of the 2006 National Census, the village's population was 82 in 32 households, when it was in Dastgerdan District (Note: Renamed the Central District of Eshqabad County) of Tabas County, Yazd province. The following census in 2011 counted 73 people in 32 households. The 2016 census measured the population of the village as 88 people in 38 households, by which time the county had been separated from the province to join South Khorasan province.

In 2024, the district was separated from the county in the establishment of Eshqabad County and renamed the Central District.
