= Yusefabad-e Bam =

Village in South Khorasan province, Iran

Yusefabad-e Bam Persian: يوسف ابادبم
- Village
- Location within Iran
- Coordinates: 34°21′52″N 57°07′36″E
- Country: Iran
- Province: South Khorasan
- County: Eshqabad
- District: Central
- Rural District: Dastgerdan

Population (2016)
  - Total: 135
- Time zone: UTC+3:30 (IRST)

Yusefabad-e Bam (Persian: يوسف ابادبم) (Note: Also romanized as Yūsefābād-e Bam; also known as Bam) is a village in Dastgerdan Rural District of the Central District (Note: Formerly Dastgerdan District of Tabas County) in Eshqabad County, South Khorasan province, Iran.

== Demographics ==
=== Population ===
At the time of the 2006 National Census, the village's population was 135 in 49 households, when it was in Dastgerdan District (Note: Renamed the Central District of Eshqabad County) of Tabas County, Yazd province. The following census in 2011 counted 107 people in 45 households. The 2016 census measured the population of the village as 135 people in 57 households, by which time the county had been separated from the province to join South Khorasan province.

In 2024, the district was separated from the county in the establishment of Eshqabad County and renamed the Central District.
