= Tappeh Taq =

Village in South Khorasan province, Iran

Tappeh Taq Persian: تپه طاق
- Village
- Location within Iran
- Coordinates: 34°54′11″N 57°14′50″E
- Country: Iran
- Province: South Khorasan
- County: Eshqabad
- District: Kuh Yakhab
- Rural District: Kuh Yakhab

Population (2016)
  - Total: 439
- Time zone: UTC+3:30 (IRST)

Tappeh Taq (Persian: تپه طاق) (Note: Also romanized as Tappeh Ţāq; also known as Pathūk and Pazūk) is a village in, and the former capital of, Kuh Yakhab Rural District in Kuh Yakhab District of Eshqabad County, South Khorasan province, Iran, serving as capital of the district. The rural district's capital has been transferred to the village of Yakhab.

== Demographics ==
=== Population ===
At the time of the 2006 National Census, the village's population was 392 in 104 households, when it was in Dastgerdan District (Note: Renamed the Central District of Eshqabad County) of Tabas County, Yazd province. The following census in 2011 counted 523 people in 148 households. The 2016 census measured the population of the village as 439 people in 121 households, by which time the county had been separated from the province to join South Khorasan province. It was the most populous village in its rural district.

In 2024, the district was separated from the county in the establishment of Eshqabad County and renamed the Central District. The rural district was transferred to the new Kuh Yakhab District.
