= Nuk, Eshqabad =

Village in South Khorasan province, Iran

Nuk Persian: نوك
- Village
- Location within Iran
- Coordinates: 34°19′09″N 56°55′37″E
- Country: Iran
- Province: South Khorasan
- County: Eshqabad
- District: Central
- Rural District: Dastgerdan

Population (2016)
  - Total: 177
- Time zone: UTC+3:30 (IRST)

Nuk (Persian: نوك) (Note: Also romanized as Nūk) is a village in Dastgerdan Rural District of the Central District (Note: Formerly Dastgerdan District of Tabas County) in Eshqabad County, South Khorasan province, Iran.

== Demographics ==
=== Population ===
At the time of the 2006 National Census, the village's population was 161 in 43 households, when it was in Dastgerdan District (Note: Renamed the Central District of Eshqabad County) of Tabas County, Yazd province. The following census in 2011 counted 166 people in 50 households. The 2016 census measured the population of the village as 177 people in 59 households, by which time the county had been separated from the province to join South Khorasan province.

In 2024, the district was separated from the county in the establishment of Eshqabad County and renamed the Central District.
