= Beheshtabad, Tabas =

Village in South Khorasan province, Iran

Beheshtabad Persian: بهشت اباد
- Village
- Location within Iran
- Coordinates: 33°42′26″N 56°49′57″E
- Country: Iran
- Province: South Khorasan
- County: Tabas
- District: Central
- Rural District: Montazeriyeh

Population (2016)
  - Total: 523
- Time zone: UTC+3:30 (IRST)

Beheshtabad (Persian: بهشت اباد) (Note: Also romanized as Beheshtābād; also known as Darqīnān, Targhinan, and Torghīnān) is a village in Montazeriyeh Rural District of the Central District in Tabas County, South Khorasan province, Iran.

== Demographics ==
=== Population ===
At the time of the 2006 National Census, the village's population was 538 in 130 households, when it was in Yazd province. The following census in 2011 counted 656 people in 167 households. The 2016 census measured the population of the village as 523 people in 162 households, by which time the county had been separated from the province to join South Khorasan province.
