= Enayatiyeh =

Village in South Khorasan province, Iran

Enayatiyeh Persian: عنايتيه
- Village
- Location within Iran
- Coordinates: 33°34′58″N 56°54′23″E
- Country: Iran
- Province: South Khorasan
- County: Tabas
- District: Central
- Rural District: Golshan

Population (2016)
  - Total: 136
- Time zone: UTC+3:30 (IRST)

Enayatiyeh (Persian: عنايتيه) (Note: Also romanized as ‘Enāyatīyeh) is a village in Golshan Rural District of the Central District in Tabas County, South Khorasan province, Iran.

== Demographics ==
=== Population ===
At the time of the 2006 National Census, the village's population was 24 in eight households, when it was in Yazd province. The following census in 2011 counted 93 people in 28 households. The 2016 census measured the population of the village as 136 people in 44 households, by which time the county had been separated from the province to join South Khorasan province.
