= Khosrowabad, Tabas =

Village in South Khorasan province, Iran

Khosrowabad Persian: خسرواباد
- Village
- Location within Iran
- Coordinates: 33°31′28″N 56°57′08″E
- Country: Iran
- Province: South Khorasan
- County: Tabas
- District: Central
- Rural District: Golshan

Population (2016)
  - Total: 935
- Time zone: UTC+3:30 (IRST)

Khosrowabad (Persian: خسرواباد) (Note: Also romanized as Khosrowābād; also known as Khusroābād) is a village in Golshan Rural District of the Central District in Tabas County, South Khorasan province, Iran.

== Demographics ==
=== Population ===
At the time of the 2006 National Census, the village's population was 912 in 219 households, when it was in Yazd province. The following census in 2011 counted 1,039 people in 284 households. The 2016 census measured the population of the village as 935 people in 290 households, by which time the county had been separated from the province to join South Khorasan province.
