= Pir Hajat =

Village in Iran

Pir Hajat Persian: پيرحاجات
- Village
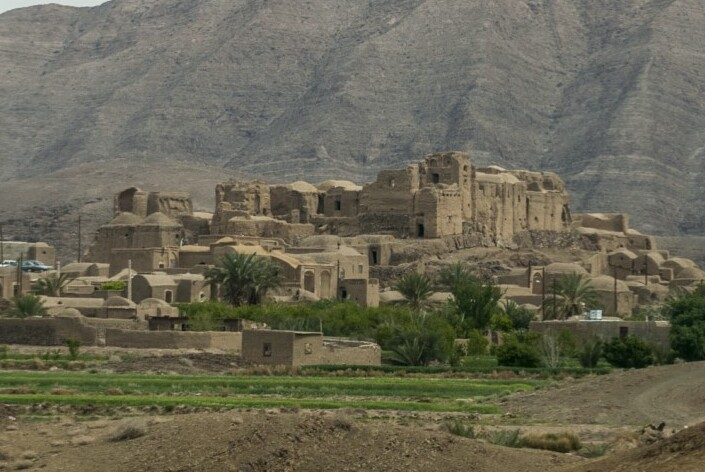
- The village of Pir Hajat

- Location within Iran
- Coordinates: 34°06′52″N 56°30′00″E
- Country: Iran
- Province: South Khorasan
- County: Tabas
- District: Central
- Rural District: Pir Hajat

Population (2016)
  - Total: 129
- Time zone: UTC+3:30 (IRST)

Pir Hajat (Persian: پيرحاجات) (Note: Also romanized as Pīr Ḩājāt and Pir-i-Hajat; also known as Pīr Hāji and Pir Hajji) is a village in Pir Hajat Rural District of the Central District in Tabas County, South Khorasan province, Iran.

== Demographics ==
=== Population ===
At the time of the 2006 National Census, the village's population was 165 in 62 households, when it was in Yazd province. The following census in 2011 counted 123 people in 51 households. The 2016 census measured the population of the village as 129 people in 59 households, by which time the county had been separated from the province to join South Khorasan province.
