= Halvan, South Khorasan =

Village in Iran

Halvan Persian: حلوان
- Village
- Location within Iran
- Coordinates: 33°56′44″N 56°16′57″E
- Country: Iran
- Province: South Khorasan
- County: Tabas
- District: Central
- Rural District: Pir Hajat

Population (2016)
  - Total: 418
- Time zone: UTC+3:30 (IRST)

Halvan (Persian: حلوان) (Note: Also romanized as Halūān and Ḩalvān) is a village in, and the capital of, Pir Hajat Rural District in the Central District of Tabas County, South Khorasan province, Iran.

== Demographics ==
=== Population ===
At the time of the 2006 National Census, the village's population was 569 in 204 households, when it was in Yazd province. The following census in 2011 counted 385 people in 134 households. The 2016 census measured the population of the village as 418 people in 138 households, by which time the county had been separated from the province to join South Khorasan province. Halvan was the most populous village in its rural district.
