= Chah Mosafer Rural District =

Rural district in South Khorasan province, Iran

Chah Mosafer Rural District Persian: دهستان چاه مسافر
- Rural District
- Location within Iran
- Coordinates: 34°41′N 57°24′E
- Country: Iran
- Province: South Khorasan
- County: Eshqabad
- District: Kuh Yakhab
- Established: 2024
- Capital: Chah Mosafer
- Time zone: UTC+3:30 (IRST)

Chah Mosafer Rural District (Persian: دهستان چاه مسافر) is in Kuh Yakhab District of Eshqabad County, South Khorasan province, Iran. Its capital is the village of Chah Mosafer, whose population at the time of the 2016 National Census was 122 people in 35 households.

== History ==
Tabas County, of which Dastgerdan District (Note: Renamed the Central District of Eshqabad County) was a part, was originally in the former province of Khorasan. When the province was divided into North, Razavi, and South Khorasan provinces in 2004, the county was not included in the new provinces, instead listed as a part of Yazd province in the 2006 and 2011 censuses.

The county was separated from the province to join South Khorasan province in 2013. In 2024, Dastgerdan District was separated from the county in the establishment of Eshqabad County and renamed the Central District. Chah Mosafer Rural District was created in the new Kuh Yakhab District.

== Other villages in the rural district ==
- Anjireh-ye Pain
- Chah-e Howz-e Karbalayi Asadollah
- Chah-e Shur
- Howz-e Zireh
- Huk
- Kal-e Abdol Ghani
- Kalleh Howzha
- Karkas Ab
