= Fahalanj =

Village in South Khorasan province, Iran

Fahalanj Persian: فهالنج
- Village
- Location within Iran
- Coordinates: 33°24′44″N 56°57′18″E
- Country: Iran
- Province: South Khorasan
- County: Tabas
- District: Central
- Rural District: Nakhlestan

Population (2016)
  - Total: 1,245
- Time zone: UTC+3:30 (IRST)

Fahalanj (Persian: فهالنج) (Note: Also romanized as Fahālanj and Fahālonj; also known as Fehlunj) is a village in Nakhlestan Rural District of the Central District in Tabas County, South Khorasan province, Iran.

== Demographics ==
=== Population ===
At the time of the 2006 National Census, the village's population was 1,258 in 336 households, when it was in Yazd province. The following census in 2011 counted 1,346 people in 406 households. The 2016 census measured the population of the village as 1,245 people in 421 households, by which time the county had been separated from the province to join South Khorasan province.
