= Deh-e Shur, South Khorasan =

Village in South Khorasan province, Iran

Deh-e Shur Persian: دهشور
- Village
- Location within Iran
- Coordinates: 33°46′34″N 56°45′05″E
- Country: Iran
- Province: South Khorasan
- County: Tabas
- District: Central
- Rural District: Montazeriyeh

Population (2016)
  - Total: 221
- Time zone: UTC+3:30 (IRST)

Deh-e Shur (Persian: دهشور) (Note: Also romanized as Deh-e Shūr; also known as Deh Shūrāb and Deh-e Shūrāb) is a village in Montazeriyeh Rural District of the Central District in Tabas County, South Khorasan province, Iran.

== Demographics ==
=== Population ===
At the time of the 2006 National Census, the village's population was 220 in 61 households, when it was in Yazd province. The following census in 2011 counted 234 people in 63 households. The 2016 census measured the population of the village as 221 people in 70 households, by which time the county had been separated from the province to join South Khorasan province.
