= Ebrahimabad-e Pain =

Village in South Khorasan province, Iran

Ebrahimabad-e Pain Persian: ابراهيم ابادپائين
- Village
- Location within Iran
- Coordinates: 33°26′14″N 56°56′25″E
- Country: Iran
- Province: South Khorasan
- County: Tabas
- District: Central
- Rural District: Nakhlestan

Population (2016)
  - Total: 179
- Time zone: UTC+3:30 (IRST)

Ebrahimabad-e Pain (Persian: ابراهيم ابادپائين) (Note: Also romanized as Ebrāhīmābād-e Pā’īn; also known as Ebrahimabad-e Sofla) is a village in Nakhlestan Rural District of the Central District in Tabas County, South Khorasan province, Iran.

== Demographics ==
=== Population ===
The village did not appear in the 2006 National Census, when it was in Yazd province. The following census in 2011 counted 191 people in 53 households. The 2016 census measured the population of the village as 179 people in 59 households, by which time the county had been separated from the province to join South Khorasan province.
