= Dashtgharan =

Village in South Khorasan province, Iran

Dashtgharan Persian: دشتغران
- Village
- Location within Iran
- Coordinates: 33°33′55″N 56°53′45″E
- Country: Iran
- Province: South Khorasan
- County: Tabas
- District: Central
- Rural District: Golshan

Population (2016)
  - Total: 2,290
- Time zone: UTC+3:30 (IRST)

Dashtgharan (Persian: دشتغران) (Note: Also romanized as Dasht-e Gharrān and Dashtgharān; also known as Dashgharrān, Dasht-e Qarān, and Dasht-e Qarān) is a village in, and the capital of, Golshan Rural District in the Central District of Tabas County, South Khorasan province, Iran.

== Demographics ==
=== Population ===
At the time of the 2006 National Census, the village's population was 1,835 in 428 households, when it was in Yazd province. The following census in 2011 counted 2,070 people in 577 households. The 2016 census measured the population of the village as 2,290 people in 681 households, by which time the county had been separated from the province to join South Khorasan province. Dashtgharan was the most populous village in its rural district.
