= Sar Bala =

Sar Bala or Sarbala (Persian: سربالا) may refer to:

- Sarbala, Kerman
- Sar Bala, Razavi Khorasan
- Sarbala, South Khorasan
