= Mohammadabad, Montazeriyeh =

Village in South Khorasan province, Iran

Mohammadabad Persian: محمداباد
- Village
- Location within Iran
- Coordinates: 33°36′10″N 56°50′50″E
- Country: Iran
- Province: South Khorasan
- County: Tabas
- District: Central
- Rural District: Montazeriyeh

Population (2016)
  - Total: 785
- Time zone: UTC+3:30 (IRST)

Mohammadabad (Persian: محمداباد) (Note: Also romanized as Moḩammadābād) is a village in Montazeriyeh Rural District of the Central District in Tabas County, South Khorasan province, Iran.

== Demographics ==
=== Population ===
At the time of the 2006 National Census, the village's population was 675 in 172 households, when it was in Yazd province. The following census in 2011 counted 749 people in 217 households. The 2016 census measured the population of the village as 785 people in 237 households, by which time the county had been separated from the province to join South Khorasan province.
