= Kharavan =

Kharavan (Persian: خروان) may refer to:

- Kharavan-e Olya
- Kharavan-e Sofla
