= Allahabad, Tabas =

Village in South Khorasan province, Iran

Allahabad Persian: اله اباد
- Village
- Location within Iran
- Coordinates: 33°34′38″N 56°53′04″E
- Country: Iran
- Province: South Khorasan
- County: Tabas
- District: Central
- Rural District: Golshan

Population (2016)
  - Total: 233
- Time zone: UTC+3:30 (IRST)

Allahabad (Persian: اله اباد) (Note: Also romanized as Allāhābād) is a village in Golshan Rural District of the Central District in Tabas County, South Khorasan province, Iran.

== Demographics ==
=== Population ===
At the time of the 2006 National Census, the village's population was 250 in 67 households, when it was in Yazd province. The following census in 2011 counted 249 people in 74 households. The 2016 census measured the population of the village as 233 people in 71 households, by which time the county had been separated from the province to join South Khorasan province.
