= Jow Khvah =

Village in South Khorasan province, Iran

Jow Khvah Persian: جوخواه
- Village
- Location within Iran
- Coordinates: 33°43′27″N 56°48′12″E
- Country: Iran
- Province: South Khorasan
- County: Tabas
- District: Central
- Rural District: Montazeriyeh

Population (2016)
  - Total: 1,029
- Time zone: UTC+3:30 (IRST)

Jow Khvah (Persian: جوخواه) (Note: Also romanized as Jow Khvāh and Jowkhāh; also known as Chahār Deh) is a village in, and the capital of, Montazeriyeh Rural District in the Central District of Tabas County, South Khorasan province, Iran.

== Demographics ==
=== Population ===
At the time of the 2006 National Census, the village's population was 908 in 237 households, when it was in Yazd province. The following census in 2011 counted 1,074 people in 298 households. The 2016 census measured the population of the village as 1,029 people in 320 households, by which time the county had been separated from the province to join South Khorasan province. Jow Khvah was the most populous village in its rural district.
