= Kharv-e Olya, South Khorasan =

Village in South Khorasan province, Iran

Kharv-e Olya Persian: خروعليا
- Village
- Location within Iran
- Coordinates: 33°38′01″N 57°09′44″E
- Country: Iran
- Province: South Khorasan
- County: Tabas
- District: Central
- Rural District: Golshan

Population (2016)
  - Total: 207
- Time zone: UTC+3:30 (IRST)

Kharv-e Olya (Persian: خروعليا) (Note: Also romanized as Kharv-e ‘Olyā; also known as Kharv-e Bālā, Khowr, and Khūr) is a village in Golshan Rural District of the Central District in Tabas County, South Khorasan province, Iran.

== Demographics ==
=== Population ===
At the time of the 2006 National Census, the village's population was 196 in 56 households, when it was in Yazd province. The following census in 2011 counted 174 people in 53 households. The 2016 census measured the population of the village as 207 people in 71 households, by which time the county had been separated from the province to join South Khorasan province.
