= Kharavan-e Sofla =

Kharavan-e Sofla خروان سفلي
- Village
- Location within Iran
- Coordinates: 33°44′44″N 57°05′22″E
- Country: Iran
- Province: South Khorasan
- County: Tabas
- Bakhsh: Central
- Rural District: Golshan

Population (2006)
  - Total: 26
- Time zone: UTC+3:30 (IRST)
  - Summer (DST): UTC+4:30 (IRDT)

Kharavan-e Sofla (Persian: خروان سفلي, also Romanized as Kharāvān-e Soflá; also known as Kharavān-e Pā’īn) is a village in Golshan Rural District, in the Central District of Tabas County, South Khorasan Province, Iran. At the 2006 census, its population was 26, in 7 families.
