= Tashkanan =

Village in South Khorasan province, Iran

Tashkanan Persian: تش كانان
- Village
- Location within Iran
- Coordinates: 33°42′46″N 56°48′59″E
- Country: Iran
- Province: South Khorasan
- County: Tabas
- District: Central
- Rural District: Montazeriyeh

Population (2016)
  - Total: 245
- Time zone: UTC+3:30 (IRST)

Tashkanan (Persian: تش كانان) (Note: Also romanized as Tashkānān; also known as Ashkanun, Ţashjānān, Tashkāhenān, and Tashtjānān) is a village in Montazeriyeh Rural District of the Central District in Tabas County, South Khorasan province, Iran.

== Demographics ==
=== Population ===
At the time of the 2006 National Census, the village's population was 233 in 55 households, when it was in Yazd province. The following census in 2011 counted 260 people in 72 households. The 2016 census measured the population of the village as 245 people in 73 households, by which time the county had been separated from the province to join South Khorasan province.
