= Azmighan =

Village in South Khorasan province, Iran

Azmighan Persian: ازميغان
- Village
- Location within Iran
- Coordinates: 33°49′33″N 56°53′31″E
- Country: Iran
- Province: South Khorasan
- County: Tabas
- District: Central
- Rural District: Montazeriyeh

Population (2016)
  - Total: 194
- Time zone: UTC+3:30 (IRST)

Azmighan (Persian: ازميغان) (Note: Also romanized as Az̄mīghān; also known as Ezmīqān) is a village in Montazeriyeh Rural District of the Central District in Tabas County, South Khorasan province, Iran.

== Demographics ==
=== Population ===
At the time of the 2006 National Census, the village's population was 223 in 68 households, when it was in Yazd province. The following census in 2011 counted 186 people in 57 households. The 2016 census measured the population of the village as 194 people in 75 households, by which time the county had been separated from the province to join South Khorasan province.
