= Kharavan-e Olya =

Kharavan-e Olya خروان عليا
- Village
- Location within Iran
- Coordinates: 33°44′22″N 57°06′40″E
- Country: Iran
- Province: South Khorasan
- County: Tabas
- Bakhsh: Central
- Rural District: Golshan

Population (2006)
  - Total: 53
- Time zone: UTC+3:30 (IRST)
  - Summer (DST): UTC+4:30 (IRDT)

Kharavan-e Olya (Persian: خروان عليا, also Romanized as Kharāvān-e ‘Olyā; also known as Kharavān-e Bālā) is a village in Golshan Rural District, in the Central District of Tabas County, South Khorasan Province, Iran. At the 2006 census, its population was 53, in 12 families.
