= Shirabad, South Khorasan =

Village in South Khorasan province, Iran

Shirabad Persian: شيراباد
- Village
- Location within Iran
- Coordinates: 33°35′11″N 56°51′14″E
- Country: Iran
- Province: South Khorasan
- County: Tabas
- District: Central
- Rural District: Golshan

Population (2016)
  - Total: 266
- Time zone: UTC+3:30 (IRST)

Shirabad (Persian: شيراباد) (Note: Also romanized as Shīrābād) is a village in Golshan Rural District of the Central District in Tabas County, South Khorasan province, Iran.

== Demographics ==
=== Population ===
At the time of the 2006 National Census, the village's population was 332 in 86 households, when it was in Yazd province. The following census in 2011 counted 300 people in 88 households. The 2016 census measured the population of the village as 266 people in 84 households, by which time the county had been separated from the province to join South Khorasan province.
