= Jamz =

Village in South Khorasan province, Iran

Jamz Persian: جمز
- Village
- Location within Iran
- Coordinates: 33°38′02″N 56°54′06″E
- Country: Iran
- Province: South Khorasan
- County: Tabas
- District: Central
- Rural District: Montazeriyeh

Population (2016)
  - Total: 816
- Time zone: UTC+3:30 (IRST)

Jamz (Persian: جمز) is a village in Montazeriyeh Rural District of the Central District in Tabas County, South Khorasan province, Iran.

== Demographics ==
=== Population ===
At the time of the 2006 National Census, the village's population was 525 in 138 households, when it was in Yazd province. The following census in 2011 counted 836 people in 222 households. The 2016 census measured the population of the village as 816 people in 236 households, by which time the county had been separated from the province to join South Khorasan province.
