= Dehnow-ye Fatemeh Barat =

Village in South Khorasan province, Iran

Dehnow-ye Fatemeh Barat Persian: دهنوفاطمه برات
- Village
- Location within Iran
- Coordinates: 33°31′39″N 56°53′49″E
- Country: Iran
- Province: South Khorasan
- County: Tabas
- District: Central
- Rural District: Golshan

Population (2016)
  - Total: 115
- Time zone: UTC+3:30 (IRST)

Dehnow-ye Fatemeh Barat (Persian: دهنوفاطمه برات) (Note: Also romanized as Dehnow-ye Fāţemeh Barāt) is a village in Golshan Rural District of the Central District in Tabas County, South Khorasan province, Iran.

== Demographics ==
=== Population ===
At the time of the 2006 National Census, the village's population was 90 in 24 households, when it was in Yazd province. The following census in 2011 counted 97 people in 28 households. The 2016 census measured the population of the village as 115 people in 37 households, by which time the county had been separated from the province to join South Khorasan province.
