= Korit =

Village in South Khorasan province, Iran

Korit Persian: كريت
- Village
- Location within Iran
- Coordinates: 33°26′18″N 56°57′21″E
- Country: Iran
- Province: South Khorasan
- County: Tabas
- District: Central
- Rural District: Nakhlestan

Population (2016)
  - Total: 1,657
- Time zone: UTC+3:30 (IRST)
- Website: www.korit-tabas.ir

Korit (Persian: كريت) (Note: Also romanized as Korīt; also known as Ebrāhīmābād-e Pā’īn and Korīt-e Pā’īn) is a village in, and the capital of, Nakhlestan Rural District in the Central District of Tabas County, South Khorasan province, Iran.

== Demographics ==
=== Population ===
At the time of the 2006 National Census, the village's population was 1,677 in 490 households, when it was in Yazd province. The following census in 2011 counted 1,903 people in 560 households. The 2016 census measured the population of the village as 1,657 people in 521 households, by which time the county had been separated from the province to join South Khorasan province. Korit was the most populous village in its rural district.
