= Faghani =

Faghani may refer to:

- Alireza Faghani (born 1978), Iranian international football referee
- Faghani language, spoken in the Solomon Islands
- Faghani, Iran, a village in Iran
