= Somba =

Somba may refer to:

- Somba, Iran, a village in South Khorasan Province, Iran
- Somba people, an ethnic group of northern Benin
- Soma Bay, Egypt
