= Pisu =

Pisu may refer to:

== Places ==
- Pay Ostan or Pīsū, Iran
- Lake Piso or Pisu, Liberia

== People ==
- A Sardinian surname borne by
  - Mario Pisu (1910–1976), Italian film actor
  - Raffaele Pisu (1925–2019), Italian actor and comedian
  - Renata Pisu (born 1935), Italian writer
