= Pey Ostan =

Village in Iran

Pey Ostan Persian: پي استان
- Village
- Location within Iran
- Coordinates: 34°04′17″N 56°27′51″E
- Country: Iran
- Province: South Khorasan
- County: Tabas
- District: Central
- Rural District: Pir Hajat

Population (2016)
  - Total: 254
- Time zone: UTC+3:30 (IRST)

Pey Ostan (Persian: پي استان) (Note: Also romanized as Pey Ostān; also known as Paisu, Pay Ostan, Pay Ostān, Pey Sū, Pīstān, and Pīsū) is a village in Pir Hajat Rural District of the Central District in Tabas County, South Khorasan province, Iran.

== Demographics ==
=== Population ===
At the time of the 2006 National Census, the village's population was 288 in 89 households, when it was in Yazd province. The following census in 2011 counted 275 people in 96 households. The 2016 census measured the population of the village as 254 people in 95 households, by which time the county had been separated from the province to join South Khorasan province.
