= Pir Hajat Rural District =

Rural district in South Khorasan province, Iran

Pir Hajat Rural District Persian: دهستان پيرحاجات
- Rural District
- Location within Iran
- Coordinates: 34°02′N 56°05′E
- Country: Iran
- Province: South Khorasan
- County: Tabas
- District: Central
- Established: 1993
- Capital: Halvan

Population (2016)
  - Total: 808
- Time zone: UTC+3:30 (IRST)

Pir Hajat Rural District (Persian: دهستان پيرحاجات) is in the Central District of Tabas County, South Khorasan province, Iran. Its capital is the village of Halvan.

== Demographics ==
=== Population ===
At the time of the 2006 National Census, the rural district's population (as a part of Yazd province) was 1,033 in 357 households. There were 793 inhabitants in 283 households at the following census of 2011. The 2016 census measured the population of the rural district as 808 in 294 households, by which time the county had been separated from the province to join South Khorasan province. The most populous of its 29 villages was Halvan, with 418 people.

=== Other villages in the rural district ===
- Pey Ostan
- Pir Hajat
