= Montazeriyeh Rural District =

Rural district in South Khorasan province, Iran

Montazeriyeh Rural District Persian: دهستان منتظريه
- Rural District
- Location within Iran
- Coordinates: 33°24′N 56°18′E
- Country: Iran
- Province: South Khorasan
- County: Tabas
- District: Central
- Established: 1986
- Capital: Jow Khvah

Population (2016)
  - Total: 4,489
- Time zone: UTC+3:30 (IRST)

Montazeriyeh Rural District (Persian: دهستان منتظريه) is in the Central District of Tabas County, South Khorasan province, Iran. Its capital is the village of Jow Khvah.

== Demographics ==
=== Population ===
At the time of the 2006 National Census, the rural district's population (as a part of Yazd province) was 4,350 in 1,116 households. There were 4,816 inhabitants in 1,315 households at the following census of 2011. The 2016 census measured the population of the rural district as 4,489 in 1,398 households, by which time the county had been separated from the province to join South Khorasan province. The most populous of its 82 villages was Jow Khvah, with 1,029 people.

=== Other villages in the rural district ===
- Azmighan
- Beheshtabad
- Deh-e Shur
- Jamz
- Mohammadabad
- Tashkanan
