= Deh-e Mohammad Rural District =

Rural district in South Khorasan province, Iran

Deh-e Mohammad Rural District Persian: دهستان ده محمد
- Rural District
- Location within Iran
- Coordinates: 34°06′N 56°55′E
- Country: Iran
- Province: South Khorasan
- County: Eshqabad
- District: Central
- Established: 2024
- Capital: Deh-e Mohammad
- Time zone: UTC+3:30 (IRST)

Deh-e Mohammad Rural District (Persian: دهستان ده محمد) is in the Central District (Note: Formerly Dastgerdan District of Tabas County) of Eshqabad County, South Khorasan province, Iran. Its capital is the village of Deh-e Mohammad, whose population at the time of the 2016 National Census was 368 people in 126 households.

== History ==
Tabas County, of which Dastgerdan District (Note: Renamed the Central District of Eshqabad County) was a part, was originally in the former province of Khorasan. When the province was divided into North, Razavi, and South Khorasan provinces in 2004, the county was not included in the new provinces, instead listed as a part of Yazd province in the 2006 and 2011 censuses.

The county was separated from the province to join South Khorasan province in 2013. In 2024, Dastgerdan District was separated from the county in the establishment of Eshqabad County and renamed the Central District. Deh-e Mohammad Rural District was created in the same district.

== Other villages in the rural district ==
- Amirabad
- Dalakuk
- Fathabad
- Gol Shaneh
- Hasanabad-e Etemad
- Hemmatabad
- Malvand
- Mansuriyeh
- Mohammadabad
- Nosratabad
- Pashneh Daran
