= Eshqabad, South Khorasan =

City in South Khorasan province, Iran

Eshqabad Persian: عشق آباد
- City
- Location within Iran
- Coordinates: 34°22′03″N 56°55′45″E
- Country: Iran
- Province: South Khorasan
- County: Eshqabad
- District: Central
- Established as a city: 1999

Population (2016)
  - Total: 3,965
- Time zone: UTC+3:30 (IRST)

Eshqabad (Persian: عشق آباد) (Note: Also romanized as ‘Eshqābād) is a city in the Central District (Note: Formerly Dastgerdan District of Tabas County) of Eshqabad County, South Khorasan province, Iran, serving as capital of both the county and the district. It was the administrative center for Dastgerdan Rural District until its capital was transferred to the village of Hudar. The village of Eshqabad was converted to a city in 1999.

== Demographics ==
=== Population ===
At the time of the 2006 National Census, the city's population was 4,474 in 1,231 households, when it was in Dastgerdan District (Note: Renamed the Central District of Eshqabad County) of Tabas County in Yazd province. The following census in 2011 counted 4,623 people in 1,344 households. The 2016 census measured the population of the city as 3,965 people in 1,277 households, by which time the county had been separated from the province to join South Khorasan province.

In 2024, the district was separated from the county in the establishment of Eshqabad County and renamed the Central District, with Eshqabad as the new county's capital.
