= Sarbala, Kerman =

Sarbala سربالا
- Village
- Location within Iran
- Coordinates: 29°42′52″N 57°01′41″E
- Country: Iran
- Province: Kerman
- County: Bardsir
- Bakhsh: Central
- Rural District: Golzar

Population (2006)
  - Total: 44
- Time zone: UTC+3:30 (IRST)
  - Summer (DST): UTC+4:30 (IRDT)

Sarbala (Persian: سربالا, also Romanized as Sarbālā) is a village in Golzar Rural District, in the Central District of Bardsir County, Kerman Province, Iran. At the 2006 census, its population was 44, in 11 families.
