= Nakhlestan Rural District (Tabas County) =

Rural district in South Khorasan province, Iran

Nakhlestan Rural District Persian: دهستان نخلستان
- Rural District
- Location within Iran
- Coordinates: 32°58′N 56°28′E
- Country: Iran
- Province: South Khorasan
- County: Tabas
- District: Central
- Established: 1986
- Capital: Korit

Population (2016)
  - Total: 3,081
- Time zone: UTC+3:30 (IRST)

Nakhlestan Rural District (Persian: دهستان نخلستان) is in the Central District of Tabas County, South Khorasan province, Iran. Its capital is the village of Korit.

== Demographics ==
=== Population ===
At the time of the 2006 National Census, the rural district's population (as a part of Yazd province) was 3,122 in 873 households. There were 3,446 inhabitants in 1,021 households at the following census of 2011. The 2016 census measured the population of the rural district as 3,081 in 1,001 households, by which time the county had been separated from the province to join South Khorasan province. The most populous of its 21 villages was Korit, with 1,657 people.

=== Other villages in the rural district ===
- Ebrahimabad-e Pain
- Fahalanj
