= Golshan Rural District =

Rural district in South Khorasan province, Iran

Golshan Rural District Persian: دهستان گلشن
- Rural District
- Location within Iran
- Coordinates: 33°34′N 57°01′E
- Country: Iran
- Province: South Khorasan
- County: Tabas
- District: Central
- Established: 1986
- Capital: Dashtgharan

Population (2016)
  - Total: 4,474
- Time zone: UTC+3:30 (IRST)

Golshan Rural District (Persian: دهستان گلشن) is in the Central District of Tabas County, South Khorasan province, Iran. Its capital is the village of Dashtgharan.

== Demographics ==
=== Population ===
At the time of the 2006 National Census, the rural district's population (as a part of Yazd province) was 4,002 in 988 households. There were 4,364 inhabitants in 1,233 households at the following census of 2011. The 2016 census measured the population of the rural district as 4,474 in 1,371 households, by which time the county had been separated from the province to join South Khorasan province. The most populous of its 40 villages was Dashtgharan, with 2,290 people.

=== Other villages in the rural district ===
- Allahabad
- Dehnow-ye Fatemeh Barat
- Enayatiyeh
- Kharv-e Olya
- Khosrowabad
- Shirabad
