= Kuh Yakhab Rural District =

Rural district in South Khorasan province, Iran

Kuh Yakhab Rural District Persian: دهستان كوه يخاب
- Rural District
- Location within Iran
- Coordinates: 34°42′N 56°58′E
- Country: Iran
- Province: South Khorasan
- County: Eshqabad
- District: Kuh Yakhab
- Established: 1993
- Capital: Yakhab

Population (2016)
  - Total: 2,049
- Time zone: UTC+3:30 (IRST)

Kuh Yakhab Rural District (Persian: دهستان كوه يخاب) is in Kuh Yakhab District of Eshqabad County, South Khorasan province, Iran. Its capital is the village of Yakhab. The previous capital of the rural district was the village of Tappeh Taq.

== Demographics ==
=== Population ===
At the time of the 2006 National Census, the rural district's population (as a part of Dastgerdan District (Note: Renamed the Central District of Eshqabad County) in Tabas County, Yazd province) was 2,764 in 688 households. There were 1,966 inhabitants in 533 households at the following census of 2011. The 2016 census measured the population of the rural district as 2,049 in 598 households, by which time the county had been separated from the province to join South Khorasan province. The most populous of its 100 villages was Tappeh Taq, with 439 people.

In 2024, the district was separated from the county in the establishment of Eshqabad County and renamed the Central District. The rural district was transferred to the new Kuh Yakhab District.

=== Other villages in the rural district ===
- Chah Balu
- Chah Puzeh
- Gazu
- Gusheh Kamar
- Kalateh-ye Rezaqoli
- Karimabad
- Kavir Kaj
- Madan Qaleh
- Madan-e Alimorad
- Ozbekuy-e Jadid
- Padeh-ye Bid
- Qarcheh
- Samba
- Sar Bala
- Senjedu
- Zabar Kuh
