= Dastgerdan Rural District =

Rural district in South Khorasan province, Iran

Dastgerdan Rural District Persian: دهستان دستگردان
- Rural District
- Location within Iran
- Coordinates: 34°14′N 56°48′E
- Country: Iran
- Province: South Khorasan
- County: Eshqabad
- District: Central
- Established: 1986
- Capital: Hudar

Population (2016)
  - Total: 4,241
- Time zone: UTC+3:30 (IRST)

Dastgerdan Rural District (Persian: دهستان دستگردان) is in the Central District (Note: Formerly Dastgerdan District of Tabas County) of Eshqabad County, South Khorasan province, Iran. Its capital is the village of Hudar. It was previously administered from the city of Eshqabad.

== Demographics ==
=== Population ===
At the time of the 2006 National Census, the rural district's population (as a part of Dastgerdan District (Note: Renamed the Central District of Eshqabad County) in Tabas County, Yazd province) was 4,421 in 1,327 households. There were 4,237 inhabitants in 1,407 households at the following census of 2011. The 2016 census measured the population of the rural district as 4,241 in 1,475 households, by which time the county had been separated from the province to join South Khorasan province. The most populous of its 108 villages was Hudar, with 443 people.

In 2024, the district was separated from the county in the establishment of Eshqabad County and renamed the Central District.

=== Other villages in the rural district ===
- Ahmadabad
- Ahmadabad-e Kalateh
- Aliabad-e Chah Kavir
- Bozhughar
- Chah Kam
- Chah Tarakh-e Olya
- Dastgerdan
- Deh Now
- Deh Now-e Van
- Ebrahimabad
- Ghaniabad
- Heydariyeh
- Jafarabad
- Kamraniyeh
- Karimabad
- Kazemabad
- Mehdiabad
- Mohammadabad
- Mohammadabad-e Chah Kavir
- Mosha-e Jeyyed
- Nasrabad
- Nejatabad
- Nuk
- Qaemiyeh
- Rahimabad
- Razaviyeh-ye Abkhvorak
- Shamsabad
- Yaqubiyeh
- Yusefabad-e Bam
