= Kuh Yakhab District =

District in South Khorasan province, Iran

Kuh Yakhab District Persian: بخش کوه یخاب
- District
- Location within Iran
- Coordinates: 34°42′N 56°55′E
- Country: Iran
- Province: South Khorasan
- County: Eshqabad
- Established: 2024
- Capital: Tappeh Taq
- Time zone: UTC+3:30 (IRST)

Kuh Yakhab District (Persian: بخش کوه یخاب) is in Eshqabad County of South Khorasan province, Iran. Its capital is the village of Tappeh Taq, whose population at the time of the 2016 National Census was 439 people in 121 households.

== History ==
Tabas County, of which Dastgerdan District (Note: Renamed the Central District of Eshqabad County) was a part, was originally in the former province of Khorasan. When the province was divided into North, Razavi, and South Khorasan provinces in 2004, the county was not included in the new provinces, instead listed as a part of Yazd province in the 2006 and 2011 censuses.

The county was separated from the province to join South Khorasan province in 2013. In 2024, Dastgerdan District was separated from the county in the establishment of Eshqabad County and renamed the Central District. The new county was divided into two districts of two rural districts each, with Eshqabad as its capital and only city at the time.

== Demographics ==
=== Administrative divisions ===
Kuh Yakhab District
Administrative Divisions
Chah Mosafer RD
Kuh Yakhab RD
RD = Rural District
