= Central District (Tabas County) =

District in South Khorasan province, Iran

Central District (Tabas County) Persian: بخش مرکزی شهرستان طبس
- District
- Location within Iran
- Coordinates: 33°14′N 56°19′E
- Country: Iran
- Province: South Khorasan
- County: Tabas
- Capital: Tabas

Population (2016)
  - Total: 52,528
- Time zone: UTC+3:30 (IRST)

The Central District of Tabas County (Persian: بخش مرکزی شهرستان طبس) is in South Khorasan province, Iran. Its capital is the city of Tabas.

== History ==
Tabas County became a part of Yazd province in 2004, transferring to South Khorasan province in 2013.

== Demographics ==
=== Population ===
At the time of the 2006 National Census, the district's population was 43,188 in 11,296 households. The following census in 2011 counted 48,569 people in 13,755 households. The 2016 census measured the population of the district as 52,528 inhabitants in 15,940 households.

=== Administrative divisions ===
Central District (Tabas County) Population (Note: As a part of Yazd province at the 2006 and 2011 censuses)
| Administrative Divisions | 2006 | 2011 | 2016 |
|---|---|---|---|
| Golshan RD | 4,002 | 4,364 | 4,474 |
| Montazeriyeh RD | 4,350 | 4,816 | 4,489 |
| Nakhlestan RD | 3,122 | 3,446 | 3,081 |
| Pir Hajat RD | 1,033 | 793 | 808 |
| Tabas (city) | 30,681 | 35,150 | 39,676 |
| Total | 43,188 | 48,569 | 52,528 |
RD = Rural District
