= Eshqabad County =

County in South Khorasan province, Iran

Eshqabad County Persian: شهرستان عشق‌آباد
- County
- Location of Eshqabad County in South Khorasan province (top left, green)

- Location of South Khorasan province in Iran
- Coordinates: 34°33′N 56°48′E
- Country: Iran
- Province: South Khorasan
- Established: 2024
- Capital: Eshqabad
- Districts: Central, Kuh Yakhab
- Time zone: UTC+3:30 (IRST)

Eshqabad County (Persian: شهرستان عشق‌آباد) is in South Khorasan province, Iran. Its capital is the city of Eshqabad, whose population at the time of the 2016 National Census was 3,965 people in 1,277 households.

== History ==
Tabas County, of which Dastgerdan District (Note: Renamed the Central District of Eshqabad County) was a part, was originally in the former province of Khorasan. When the province was divided into North, Razavi, and South Khorasan provinces in 2004, the county was not included in the new provinces, instead listed as a part of Yazd province in the 2006 and 2011 censuses.

The county was separated from the province to join South Khorasan province in 2013. In 2024, Dastgerdan District was separated from the county in the establishment of Eshqabad County and renamed the Central District. The new county was divided into two districts of two rural districts each, with Eshqabad as its capital and only city at the time.

== Demographics ==
=== Administrative divisions ===
Eshqabad County's administrative structure is shown in the following table.

Administrative Divisions
Central District (Note: Formerly Dastgerdan District of Tabas County)
Dastgerdan RD
Deh-e Mohammad RD
Eshqabad (city)
Kuh Yakhab District
Chah Mosafer RD
Kuh Yakhab RD
RD = Rural District
