= Central District (Eshqabad County) =

District in South Khorasan province, Iran

Central District (Eshqabad County) Persian: بخش مرکزی شهرستان عشق‌آباد
- District
- Location within Iran
- Coordinates: 34°14′N 56°48′E
- Country: Iran
- Province: South Khorasan
- County: Eshqabad
- Capital: Eshqabad

Population (2016)
  - Total: 10,255 (Note: As Dastgerdan District of Tabas County)
- Time zone: UTC+3:30 (IRST)

The Central District of Eshqabad County (Persian: بخش مرکزی شهرستان عشق‌آباد) (Note: Formerly Dastgerdan District (بخش دستگردان) of Tabas County) is in South Khorasan province, Iran. Its capital is the city of Eshqabad.

== History ==
Tabas County, of which Dastgerdan District (Note: Renamed the Central District of Eshqabad County) was a part, was originally in the former province of Khorasan. When the province was divided into North, Razavi, and South Khorasan provinces in 2004, the county was not included in the new provinces, instead listed as a part of Yazd province in the 2006 and 2011 censuses.

The county was separated from the province to join South Khorasan province in 2013. In 2024, Dastgerdan District was separated from the county in the establishment of Eshqabad County and renamed the Central District. The new county was divided into two districts of two rural districts each, with Eshqabad as its capital and only city at the time.

== Demographics ==
=== Population ===
At the time of the 2006 National Census, the district's population (as Dastgerdan District of Tabas County) was 11,659 in 3,246 households. The following census in 2011 counted 10,826 people in 3,284 households. The 2016 census measured the population of the district as 10,255 inhabitants in 3,350 households.

=== Administrative divisions ===
Central District (Eshqabad County) (Note: As Dastgerdan District of Tabas County at the 2006, 2011, and 2016 censuses)
Administrative Divisions	2006	2011	2016
Dastgerdan RD	4,421	4,237	4,241
Deh-e Mohammad RD (Note: Established after the 2016 census)			
Kuh Yakhab RD (Note: Transferred to Kuh Yakhab District after the 2016 census)	2,764	1,966	2,049
Eshqabad (city)	4,474	4,623	3,965
Total	11,659	10,826	10,255
RD = Rural District
