= Tabas County =

County in South Khorasan province, Iran

Tabas County Persian: شهرستان طبس
- County
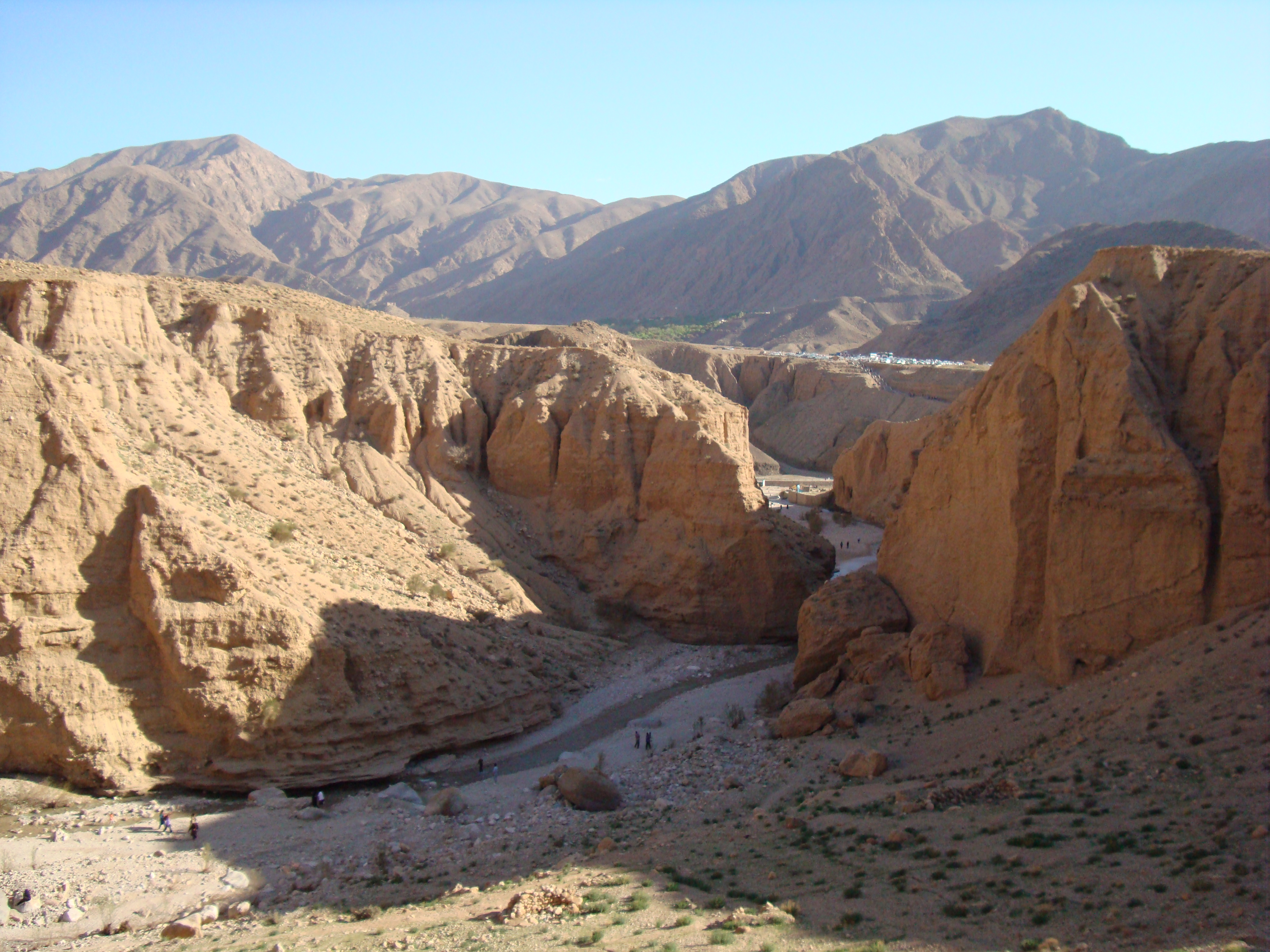
- Landscape in Tabas County

- Location of Tabas County in South Khorasan province (left, yellow)

- Location of South Khorasan province in Iran
- Coordinates: 33°26′N 56°48′E
- Country: Iran
- Province: South Khorasan
- Capital: Tabas
- Districts: Central, Dastgerdan, Deyhuk

Population (2016)
  - Total: 72,617
- Time zone: UTC+3:30 (IRST)

Tabas County (Persian: شهرستان طبس) is in South Khorasan province, Iran. Its capital is the city of Tabas.

== History ==
Tabas County became a part of Yazd province in 2004. The county was separated from the province to join South Khorasan province in 2013.

In 2024, Dastgerdan District (Note: Renamed the Central District of Eshqabad County) was separated from the county in the establishment of Eshqabad County and renamed the Central District.

== Demographics ==
=== Population ===
At the time of the 2006 National Census, the county's population was 63,047 in 16,845 households. The following census in 2011 counted 69,658 people in 19,745 households. The 2016 census measured the population of the county as 72,617 in 22,142 households.

=== Administrative divisions ===
Tabas County's population history and administrative structure over three consecutive censuses are shown in the following table.

Tabas County Population (Note: As a part of Yazd province at the 2006 and 2011 censuses)
Administrative Divisions	2006	2011	2016
Central District	43,188	48,569	52,528
Golshan RD	4,002	4,364	4,474
Montazeriyeh RD	4,350	4,816	4,489
Nakhlestan RD	3,122	3,446	3,081
Pir Hajat RD	1,033	793	808
Tabas (city)	30,681	35,150	39,676
Dastgerdan District (Note: Transferred to Eshqabad County after the 2016 census and renamed the Central District)	11,659	10,826	10,255
Dastgerdan RD	4,421	4,237	4,241
Kuh Yakhab RD	2,764	1,966	2,049
Eshqabad (city)	4,474	4,623	3,965
Deyhuk District	8,200	10,263	9,834
Deyhuk RD	1,926	2,502	2,793
Kavir RD	3,507	4,415	4,082
Deyhuk (city)	2,767	3,346	2,959
Total	63,047	69,658	72,617
RD = Rural District

== See also ==
Operation Eagle Claw

Media related to Tabas County at Wikimedia Commons
