= Sar Asiab =

Sar Asiab or Sarasiab or Sar Asyab or Sarasiyab or Sar Asiyab Sar-e Asiab or Sar-i-Asiab or Sar Aseyab (Persian: سراسياب) may refer to:

== Fars Province ==
- Sar Asiab-e Bala, Fars, a village in Mamasani County
- Sar Asiab-e Pain, Fars, a village in Mamasani County

== Isfahan Province ==
- Sar Asiab, Isfahan, a village in Natanz County

== Kerman Province ==
- Sar Asiab, Jiroft, Kerman Province
- Sar Asiyab, Shahr-e Babak, Kerman Province
- Sar Asiab, Pa Qaleh, Shahr-e Babak County, Kerman Province
- Sar Asiab-e Bala, Kerman
- Sar Asiab-e Shesh, Kerman Province
- Sar Asiab-e Farsangi Rural District, in Kerman Province

== Kermanshah Province ==
- Sar Asiab, Dalahu, Kermanshah Province
- Sar Asiab, Harsin, Kermanshah Province
- Sarasiab, Kermanshah, Kermanshah Province
- Sar Asiab, Sahneh, Kermanshah Province

== Khuzestan Province ==
- Sarasiyab, Khuzestan

== Kohgiluyeh and Boyer-Ahmad Province ==
- Sar Asiab-e Yusefi, a village in Bahmai County
- Sar Asiab-e Yusefi Rural District, in Bahmai County
- Sar Asiab-e Karreh, a village in Dana County
- Sar Asiab-e Ajam, a village in Kohgiluyeh County
- Sar Asiab-e Landeh, a village in Landeh County

== Razavi Khorasan Province ==
- Sar Asiab, Chenaran, Razavi Khorasan Province
- Sar Asiab, Gonabad, Razavi Khorasan Province
- Sar Asiab, Rashtkhvar, Razavi Khorasan Province
- Sar Asiab, Torqabeh and Shandiz, Razavi Khorasan Province
- Sar Asiab-e Bala, Razavi Khorasan

== South Khorasan Province ==
- Sar Asiab, South Khorasan
- Sar Asiab-e Mirza, South Khorasan Province

== Other ==
- Sar Asiab-e Bala (disambiguation)
- Sar Asiab-e Farsangi (disambiguation)
- Sar Asiab-e Pain (disambiguation)
