= Zamanabad =

Zamanabad (Persian: زمان اباد) may refer to:

== Chaharmahal and Bakhtiari Province ==
- Zamanabad, Chaharmahal and Bakhtiari, a village in Kuhrang County

== East Azerbaijan Province ==
- Zamanabad, East Azerbaijan, a village in Malekan County

== Hamadan Province ==
- Zamanabad, Malayer, a village in Malayer County
- Zamanabad-e Mohammadabad, a village in Malayer County
- Zamanabad, Nahavand, a village in Nahavand County

== Isfahan Province ==
- Zamanabad, Isfahan, a village in Isfahan County
- Zamanabad, Lenjan, a village in Lenjan County
- Zamanabad, Nain, a village in Nain County

== Kerman Province ==
- Zamanabad, Baft, a village in Baft County
- Zamanabad, Fahraj, a village in Fahraj County
- Zamanabad, Kerman, a village in Kerman County

== Kermanshah Province ==
- Zamanabad, Kermanshah, a village in Kermanshah County

== Khuzestan Province ==
- Zamanabad, Khuzestan, a village in Masjed Soleyman County

== Markazi Province ==
- Zamanabad, Saveh, a village in Saveh County

== North Khorasan Province ==
- Zamanabad, North Khorasan

== Razavi Khorasan Province ==
- Zamanabad, Bardaskan, a village in Bardaskan County
- Zamanabad, Mashhad, a village in Mashhad County
- Zamanabad, Torbat-e Heydarieh, a village in Torbat-e Heydarieh County

== Semnan Province ==
- Zamanabad, Semnan

== South Khorasan Province ==
- Zamanabad, South Khorasan

== Tehran Province ==
- Zamanabad, Tehran

== West Azerbaijan Province ==
- Zamanabad, West Azerbaijan, a village in Shahin Dezh County
