= Vameqabad =

Vameqabad وامق اباد
- Village
- Location within Iran
- Coordinates: 30°31′08″N 57°15′01″E
- Country: Iran
- Province: Kerman
- County: Kerman
- Bakhsh: Central
- Rural District: Derakhtengan

Population (2006)
  - Total: 161
- Time zone: UTC+3:30 (IRST)
  - Summer (DST): UTC+4:30 (IRDT)

Vameqabad (Persian: وامق اباد, also Romanized as Vāmeqābād) is a village in Derakhtengan Rural District, in the Central District of Kerman County, Kerman Province, Iran. At the 2006 census, its population was 161, in 59 families.
