= Deh-e Kafi =

Deh-e Kafi ده كافي
- Village
- Location within Iran
- Coordinates: 30°29′17″N 57°16′56″E
- Country: Iran
- Province: Kerman
- County: Kerman
- Bakhsh: Central
- Rural District: Derakhtengan

Population (2006)
  - Total: 22
- Time zone: UTC+3:30 (IRST)
  - Summer (DST): UTC+4:30 (IRDT)

Deh-e Kafi (Persian: ده كافي, also Romanized as Deh-e Kāfī) is a village in Derakhtengan Rural District, in the Central District of Kerman County, Kerman Province, Iran. At the 2006 census, its population was 22, in 5 families.
