= Hoseynabad-e Akhund, Kerman =

Village in Kerman, Iran

Hoseynabad-e Akhund حسين اباداخوند
- Village
- Location within Iran
- Coordinates: 30°14′56″N 57°11′03″E
- Country: Iran
- Province: Kerman
- County: Kerman
- Bakhsh: Central
- Rural District: Sar Asiab-e Farsangi

Population (2006)
  - Total: 55
- Time zone: UTC+3:30 (IRST)
  - Summer (DST): UTC+4:30 (IRDT)

Hoseynabad-e Akhund (Persian: حسين اباداخوند, also Romanized as Ḩoseynābād-e Akhūnd; also known as Ḩoseynābād, Ḩoseynābād-e Khān, and Husainābād) is a village in Sar Asiab-e Farsangi Rural District, in the Central District of Kerman County, Kerman Province, Iran. At the 2006 census, its population was 55, in 16 families.
