= Pashishkuiyeh =

Pashishkuiyeh پشيشكوئيه
- Village
- Location within Iran
- Coordinates: 30°08′24″N 57°37′12″E
- Country: Iran
- Province: Kerman
- County: Kerman
- Bakhsh: Golbaf
- Rural District: Jowshan

Population (2006)
  - Total: 24
- Time zone: UTC+3:30 (IRST)
  - Summer (DST): UTC+4:30 (IRDT)

Pashishkuiyeh (Persian: پشيشكوئيه, also Romanized as Pashīshkū’īyeh) is a village in Jowshan Rural District, Golbaf District, Kerman County, Kerman Province, Iran. At the 2006 census, its population was 24, in 7 families.
