= Sar Taavoneh =

Sar Taavoneh سرطاعونه
- Village
- Location within Iran
- Coordinates: 30°29′10″N 57°19′36″E
- Country: Iran
- Province: Kerman
- County: Kerman
- Bakhsh: Central
- Rural District: Derakhtengan

Population (2006)
  - Total: 13
- Time zone: UTC+3:30 (IRST)
  - Summer (DST): UTC+4:30 (IRDT)

Sar Taavoneh (Persian: سرطاعونه, also Romanized as Sar Ta‘āvoneh and Sar Ţāveneh; also known as Sar Ţāhū’īyeh) is a village in Derakhtengan Rural District, in the Central District of Kerman County, Kerman Province, Iran. At the 2006 census, its population was 13, in 4 families.
