= BUJ =

BUJ, B.U.J, or buj can refer to:

- Bou Saada Airport, an airport near Bou Saada, Algeria
- Bowj (also spelled "Buj"), a village in Kerman province, Iran
- Bovaj (also spelled "Buj"), a village in South Khorasan province, Iran
- Buj, a village in Hungary
- Emma Buj (born 1972), Spanish politician
- Burton Joyce railway station, a train station in Burton Joyce, Nottinghamshire, England, U.K.
- Baccalaureus Utriusque Juris (abbreviated B.U.J.), an abbreviation meaning "Bachelor of Both Laws" (i.e. both civil law and canon law); see List of classical abbreviations
- Koromba language, a language spoken in Nigeria, by ISO 639 code
- A Lamborghini V10 engine
