= Simak, Iran =

Simak سيمك
- Village
- Location within Iran
- Coordinates: 30°29′52″N 57°11′42″E
- Country: Iran
- Province: Kerman
- County: Kerman
- Bakhsh: Central
- Rural District: Derakhtengan

Population (2006)
  - Total: 19
- Time zone: UTC+3:30 (IRST)
  - Summer (DST): UTC+4:30 (IRDT)

Simak (Persian: سيمك, also Romanized as Sīmak) is a village in Derakhtengan Rural District, in the Central District of Kerman County, Kerman Province, Iran. At the 2006 census, its population was 19, in 8 families.
