= Darsinuyeh =

Darsinuyeh دارسينوييه
- Village
- Location within Iran
- Coordinates: 30°22′59″N 57°14′11″E
- Country: Iran
- Province: Kerman
- County: Kerman
- Bakhsh: Central
- Rural District: Derakhtengan

Population (2006)
  - Total: 32
- Time zone: UTC+3:30 (IRST)
  - Summer (DST): UTC+4:30 (IRDT)

Darsinuyeh (Persian: دارسينوييه, also Romanized as Dārsīnūyeh and Darsinoo’iyeh; also known as Darsīnu) is a village in Derakhtengan Rural District, in the Central District of Kerman County, Kerman Province, Iran. At the 2006 census, its population was 32, in 11 families.
