= Fendoqa =

Fendoqa فندقاع
- Village
- Location within Iran
- Coordinates: 30°00′35″N 57°40′13″E
- Country: Iran
- Province: Kerman
- County: Kerman
- Bakhsh: Golbaf
- Rural District: Jowshan

Population (2006)
  - Total: 117
- Time zone: UTC+3:30 (IRST)
  - Summer (DST): UTC+4:30 (IRDT)

Fendoqa (Persian: فندقاع, also Romanized as Fendoqā‘) is a village in Jowshan Rural District, Golbaf District, Kerman County, Kerman Province, Iran. At the 2006 census, its population was 117, in 34 families.
