= Mian Do Kuh =

Mian Do Kuh ميان دوكوه
- Village
- Country: Iran
- Province: Kerman
- County: Kerman
- Bakhsh: Central
- Rural District: Zangiabad

Population (2006)
  - Total: 27
- Time zone: UTC+3:30 (IRST)
  - Summer (DST): UTC+4:30 (IRDT)

Mian Do Kuh (Persian: ميان دوكوه, also Romanized as Mīān Do Kūh) is a village in Zangiabad Rural District, in the Central District of Kerman County, Kerman Province, Iran. At the 2006 census, its population was 27, in 5 families.
