= Jushan =

Jushan or Jowshan (Persian: جوشان or جوشن) may refer to several places:

- Jushan, Isfahan (جوشان - Jūshān), a village in Iran
- Jowshan, Kerman (جوشان - Jowshān), a village in Iran
- Jushan, Kurdistan (جوشن - Jūshan), a village in Iran
- Jushan, Lorestan (جوشان - Jūshān), a village in Iran
- Jowshan Rural District, an administrative subdivision of Kerman Province, Iran

== See also ==
- Kim Young-sam (1927–2015), Korean politician
