= Tizeng =

Tizeng تيزنگ
- Village
- Location within Iran
- Coordinates: 30°29′02″N 57°16′22″E
- Country: Iran
- Province: Kerman
- County: Kerman
- Bakhsh: Central
- Rural District: Derakhtengan

Population (2006)
  - Total: 39
- Time zone: UTC+3:30 (IRST)
  - Summer (DST): UTC+4:30 (IRDT)

Tizeng (Persian: تيزنگ, also Romanized as Tīzeng; also known as Tīr Rīn and Tīr Zīn) is a village in Derakhtengan Rural District, in the Central District of Kerman County, Kerman Province, Iran. At the 2006 census, its population was 39, in 14 families.
