= Darb-e Asiab =

Darb-e Asiab درب اسياب
- Village
- Location within Iran
- Coordinates: 30°30′00″N 57°11′00″E
- Country: Iran
- Province: Kerman
- County: Kerman
- Bakhsh: Central
- Rural District: Derakhtengan

Population (2006)
  - Total: 50
- Time zone: UTC+3:30 (IRST)
  - Summer (DST): UTC+4:30 (IRDT)

Darb-e Asiab (Persian: درب اسياب, also Romanized as Darb-e Āsīāb; also known as Darb Āsyā and Darb-e Āsīā) is a village in Derakhtengan Rural District, in the Central District of Kerman County, Kerman Province, Iran. At the 2006 census, its population was 50, in 19 families.
