= Hashtadan =

Hashtadan هشتادان
- Village
- Location within Iran
- Coordinates: 30°06′07″N 57°38′05″E
- Country: Iran
- Province: Kerman
- County: Kerman
- Bakhsh: Golbaf
- Rural District: Jowshan

Population (2006)
  - Total: 242
- Time zone: UTC+3:30 (IRST)
  - Summer (DST): UTC+4:30 (IRDT)

Hashtadan (Persian: هشتادان, also Romanized as Hashtādān; also known as Hashtādom and Hashtādūn) is a village in Jowshan Rural District, Golbaf District, Kerman County, Kerman Province, Iran. At the 2006 census, its population was 242, in 58 families.
