= Bar Sorkh =

Bar Sorkh برسرخ
- Village
- Location within Iran
- Coordinates: 30°25′20″N 57°21′50″E
- Country: Iran
- Province: Kerman
- County: Kerman
- Bakhsh: Central
- Rural District: Derakhtengan

Population (2006)
  - Total: 17
- Time zone: UTC+3:30 (IRST)
  - Summer (DST): UTC+4:30 (IRDT)

Bar Sorkh (Persian: برسرخ, also Romanized as Ber-e Sorkh) is a village in Derakhtengan Rural District, in the Central District of Kerman County, Kerman Province, Iran. At the 2006 census, its population was 17, in 8 families.
