= Dowghanan =

Dowghanan دوغ نان
- Village
- Location within Iran
- Coordinates: 30°29′26″N 57°19′29″E
- Country: Iran
- Province: Kerman
- County: Kerman
- Bakhsh: Central
- Rural District: Derakhtengan

Population (2006)
  - Total: 69
- Time zone: UTC+3:30 (IRST)
  - Summer (DST): UTC+4:30 (IRDT)

Dowghanan (Persian: دوغ نان, also Romanized as Dowghanān; also known as Dowghanān-e Pā’īn and Dūghtān) is a village in Derakhtengan Rural District, in the Central District of Kerman County, Kerman Province, Iran. At the 2006 census, its population was 69, in 21 families.
