= Ahmadabad-e Do, Kerman =

Ahmadabad-e Do احمد آباد2
- Village
- Location within Iran
- Coordinates: 30°12′20″N 56°35′05″E
- Country: Iran
- Province: Kerman
- County: Kerman
- Bakhsh: Central
- Rural District: Baghin

Population (2006)
  - Total: 111
- Time zone: UTC+3:30 (IRST)
  - Summer (DST): UTC+4:30 (IRDT)

Ahmadabad-e Do (Persian: احمد آباد2, also Romanized as Aḩmadābād-e Do; also known as Aḩmadābād) is a village in Baghin Rural District, in the Central District of Kerman County, Kerman Province, Iran. At the 2006 census, its population was 111, in 26 families.
