= Nask, Kerman =

Nask نسك
- Village
- Location within Iran
- Coordinates: 29°50′13″N 57°55′55″E
- Country: Iran
- Province: Kerman
- County: Kerman
- Bakhsh: Golbaf
- Rural District: Keshit

Population (2006)
  - Total: 304
- Time zone: UTC+3:30 (IRST)
  - Summer (DST): UTC+4:30 (IRDT)

Nask (Persian: نسك) is a village in Keshit Rural District, Golbaf District, Kerman County, Kerman Province, Iran. At the 2006 census, its population was 304, in 81 families.
