= Sadabad, Kerman =

Sadabad سعداباد
- Village
- Location within Iran
- Coordinates: 30°06′25″N 57°37′08″E
- Country: Iran
- Province: Kerman
- County: Kerman
- Bakhsh: Golbaf
- Rural District: Jowshan

Population (2006)
  - Total: 81
- Time zone: UTC+3:30 (IRST)
  - Summer (DST): UTC+4:30 (IRDT)

Sadabad (Persian: سعداباد, also Romanized as Sa‘dābād; also known as Sa‘ādatābād and Sa‘īdābād) is a village in Jowshan Rural District, Golbaf District, Kerman County, Kerman Province, Iran. At the 2006 census, its population was 81, in 23 families.
