= Kermani, Kerman =

Kermani كرماني
- Village
- Location within Iran
- Coordinates: 30°28′37″N 57°18′22″E
- Country: Iran
- Province: Kerman
- County: Kerman
- Bakhsh: Central
- Rural District: Derakhtengan

Population (2006)
  - Total: 28
- Time zone: UTC+3:30 (IRST)
  - Summer (DST): UTC+4:30 (IRDT)

Kermani (Persian: كرماني, also Romanized as Kermānī) is a village in Derakhtengan Rural District, in the Central District of Kerman County, Kerman Province, Iran. At the 2006 census, its population was 28, in 10 families.
