= Gajgin =

Gajgin گجگين
- Village
- Location within Iran
- Coordinates: 30°17′02″N 57°14′26″E
- Country: Iran
- Province: Kerman
- County: Kerman
- Bakhsh: Central
- Rural District: Sar Asiab-e Farsangi

Population (2006)
  - Total: 247
- Time zone: UTC+3:30 (IRST)
  - Summer (DST): UTC+4:30 (IRDT)

Gajgin (Persian: گجگين, also Romanized as Gajgīn and Gojgīn; also known as Gajkīn) is a village in Sar Asiab-e Farsangi Rural District, in the Central District of Kerman County, Kerman Province, Iran. At the 2006 census, its population was just 247, in 62 families.
