= Darb-e Anarestan =

Darb-e Anarestan درب انارستان
- Village
- Location within Iran
- Coordinates: 30°29′21″N 57°12′49″E
- Country: Iran
- Province: Kerman
- County: Kerman
- Bakhsh: Central
- Rural District: Derakhtengan

Population (2006)
  - Total: 50
- Time zone: UTC+3:30 (IRST)
  - Summer (DST): UTC+4:30 (IRDT)

Darb-e Anarestan (Persian: درب انارستان, also Romanized as 'Darb-e Anārestān) is a village in Derakhtengan Rural District, in the Central District of Kerman County, Kerman Province, Iran. At the 2006 census, its population was 50, in 23 families.
