= Cheshmeh Gaz =

Cheshmeh Gaz چشمه گز
- Village
- Location within Iran
- Coordinates: 30°24′53″N 56°43′11″E
- Country: Iran
- Province: Kerman
- County: Kerman
- Bakhsh: Central
- Rural District: Ekhtiarabad

Population (2006)
  - Total: 328
- Time zone: UTC+3:30 (IRST)
  - Summer (DST): UTC+4:30 (IRDT)

Cheshmeh Gaz (Persian: چشمه گز, also Romanized as Chashmeh Gaz) is a village in Ekhtiarabad Rural District, in the Central District of Kerman County, Kerman Province, Iran. At the 2006 census, its population was 328, in 96 families.
