= Dang-e Nim =

Dang-e Nim دانگ نيم
- Village
- Location within Iran
- Coordinates: 30°28′41″N 57°19′18″E
- Country: Iran
- Province: Kerman
- County: Kerman
- Bakhsh: Central
- Rural District: Derakhtengan

Population (2006)
  - Total: 69
- Time zone: UTC+3:30 (IRST)
  - Summer (DST): UTC+4:30 (IRDT)

Dang-e Nim (Persian: دانگ نيم, also Romanized as Dāng-e Nīm; also known as Downgeh Nīm and Dūngeh Nīm) is a village in Derakhtengan Rural District, in the Central District of Kerman County, Kerman Province, Iran. At the 2006 census, its population was 69, in 24 families.
