= Kinegan =

Kinegan كينگان
- Village
- Location within Iran
- Coordinates: 30°18′53″N 57°16′01″E
- Country: Iran
- Province: Kerman
- County: Kerman
- Bakhsh: Central
- Rural District: Sar Asiab-e Farsangi

Population (2006)
  - Total: 141
- Time zone: UTC+3:30 (IRST)
  - Summer (DST): UTC+4:30 (IRDT)

Kinegan (Persian: كينگان, also Romanized as Kīnegān) is a village in Sar Asiab-e Farsangi Rural District, in the Central District of Kerman County, Kerman Province, Iran. At the 2006 census, its population was 141, in 39 families.
