= Mohsenabad, Kerman =

Mohsenabad محسن اباد
- Village
- Location within Iran
- Coordinates: 30°05′58″N 57°37′32″E
- Country: Iran
- Province: Kerman
- County: Kerman
- Bakhsh: Golbaf
- Rural District: Jowshan

Population (2006)
  - Total: 111
- Time zone: UTC+3:30 (IRST)
  - Summer (DST): UTC+4:30 (IRDT)

Mohsenabad (Persian: محسن اباد, also Romanized as Moḩsenābād) is a village in Jowshan Rural District, Golbaf District, Kerman County, Kerman Province, Iran. At the 2006 census, its population was 111, in 21 families.
