= Deh-e Salahi =

Deh-e Salahi ده صلاحي
- Village
- Location within Iran
- Coordinates: 30°28′59″N 57°19′36″E
- Country: Iran
- Province: Kerman
- County: Kerman
- Bakhsh: Central
- Rural District: Derakhtengan

Population (2006)
  - Total: 29
- Time zone: UTC+3:30 (IRST)
  - Summer (DST): UTC+4:30 (IRDT)

Deh-e Salahi (Persian: ده صلاحي, also romanized as Deh-e Şalāḩī; also known as Deh-e Şalāḩ) is a village in Derakhtengan Rural District, in the Central District of Kerman County, Kerman Province, Iran. At the 2006 census, its population was 29, in 9 families.
