= Ti Jeng =

Ti Jeng تي جنگ
- Village
- Location within Iran
- Coordinates: 30°34′39″N 57°21′56″E
- Country: Iran
- Province: Kerman
- County: Kerman
- Bakhsh: Central
- Rural District: Derakhtengan

Population (2006)
  - Total: 11
- Time zone: UTC+3:30 (IRST)
  - Summer (DST): UTC+4:30 (IRDT)

Ti Jeng (Persian: تي جنگ, also Romanized as Tī Jeng) is a village in Derakhtengan Rural District, in the Central District of Kerman County, Kerman Province, Iran. At the 2006 census, its population was 11, in 4 families.
