= Chah Kahnuiyeh =

Chah Kahnuiyeh چاه كهنوئيه
- Village
- Location within Iran
- Coordinates: 30°20′14″N 56°47′08″E
- Country: Iran
- Province: Kerman
- County: Kerman
- Bakhsh: Central
- Rural District: Ekhtiarabad

Population (2006)
  - Total: 126
- Time zone: UTC+3:30 (IRST)

Chah Kahnuiyeh (Persian: چاه كهنوئيه, also Romanized as Chāh Kahnū’īyeh, Chāh-e Kahnū’īyeh, and Chāh-e Kahnūyeh; also known as Chah-i-Kahnau) is a village in Ekhtiarabad Rural District, in the Central District of Kerman County, Kerman Province, Iran. At the 2006 census, its population was 126, in 34 families.
