= Dehuiyeh, Golbaf =

Dehuiyeh دهوييه
- Village
- Location within Iran
- Coordinates: 30°07′55″N 57°36′41″E
- Country: Iran
- Province: Kerman
- County: Kerman
- Bakhsh: Golbaf
- Rural District: Jowshan

Population (2006)
  - Total: 235
- Time zone: UTC+3:30 (IRST)
  - Summer (DST): UTC+4:30 (IRDT)

Dehuiyeh (Persian: دهوييه, also Romanized as Dehūīyeh; also known as Dehūyeh) is a village in Jowshan Rural District, Golbaf District, Kerman County, Kerman Province, Iran. At the 2006 census, its population was 235, in 47 families.
