= Deh-e Hasan Ali, Kerman =

Deh-e Hasan Ali ده حسنعلي
- Village
- Location within Iran
- Coordinates: 29°49′44″N 57°57′01″E
- Country: Iran
- Province: Kerman
- County: Kerman
- Bakhsh: Golbaf
- Rural District: Keshit

Population (2006)
  - Total: 8
- Time zone: UTC+3:30 (IRST)
  - Summer (DST): UTC+4:30 (IRDT)

Deh-e Hasan Ali (Persian: ده حسنعلي, also Romanized as Deh-e Ḩasan ‘Alī and Deh-e Ḩasan‘alī) is a village in Keshit Rural District, Golbaf District, Kerman County, Kerman Province, Iran. At the 2006 census, its population was 8, in 4 families.
