= Sar Asiab-e Pain, Kerman =

Village in Kerman, Iran

Sar Asiab-e Pain سراسياب پايين
- Village
- Location within Iran
- Coordinates: 30°28′54″N 57°17′52″E
- Country: Iran
- Province: Kerman
- County: Kerman
- Bakhsh: Central
- Rural District: Derakhtengan

Population (2006)
  - Total: 27
- Time zone: UTC+3:30 (IRST)
  - Summer (DST): UTC+4:30 (IRDT)

Sar Asiab-e Pain (Persian: سراسياب پايين, also Romanized as Sar Āsīāb-e Pā’īn; also known as Asīāb-e Mīān Dasht, Sar Asīāb, Sar Āsīāb, and Sar Āsyab) is a village in Derakhtengan Rural District, in the Central District of Kerman County, Kerman Province, Iran. At the 2006 census, its population was 27, in 7 families.
