= Robat, Kerman =

Village in Kerman province, Iran

Robat Persian: رباط
- Village
- Location within Iran
- Coordinates: 30°14′47″N 56°34′25″E
- Country: Iran
- Province: Kerman
- County: Kerman
- District: Central
- Rural District: Baghin

Population (2016)
  - Total: 1,597
- Time zone: UTC+3:30 (IRST)

Robat (Persian: رباط) (Note: Also romanized as Robāţ) is a village in Baghin Rural District of the Central District of Kerman County, Kerman province, Iran.

== Demographics ==
=== Population ===
At the time of the 2006 National Census, the village's population was 1,755 in 423 households. The following census in 2011 counted 1,782 people in 427 households. The 2016 census measured the population of the village as 1,597 people in 426 households. It was the most populous village in its rural district.
