= Deh-e Lulu =

Village in Kerman province, Iran

Deh-e Lulu Persian: ده لولو
- Village
- Location within Iran
- Coordinates: 30°29′49″N 57°16′37″E
- Country: Iran
- Province: Kerman
- County: Kerman
- District: Central
- Rural District: Derakhtengan

Population (2016)
  - Total: 281
- Time zone: UTC+3:30 (IRST)

Deh-e Lulu (Persian: ده لولو) (Note: Also romanized as Deh-e Lūlū; also known as Deh Lo’lo’ and Lo’lo’) is a village in, and the capital of, Derakhtengan Rural District of the Central District of Kerman County, Kerman province, Iran.

== Demographics ==
=== Population ===
At the time of the 2006 National Census, the village's population was 307 in 83 households. The following census in 2011 counted 433 people in 142 households. The 2016 census measured the population of the village as 281 people in 89 households.
