= Saidi, Iran =

Village in Kerman province, Iran

Saidi Persian: سعيدي
- Village
- Location within Iran
- Coordinates: 30°20′11″N 57°05′58″E
- Country: Iran
- Province: Kerman
- County: Kerman
- District: Central
- Rural District: Derakhtengan

Population (2016)
  - Total: 8,626
- Time zone: UTC+3:30 (IRST)

Saidi (Persian: سعيدي) (Note: Also Romanized as Sa‘īdī; also known as Bāgh-e Seyyedī, Sa‘di, and Sa‘īdābād) is a village in Derakhtengan Rural District of the Central District of Kerman County, Kerman province, Iran.

== Demographics ==
=== Population ===
At the time of the 2006 National Census, the village's population was 3,993 in 1,008 households. The following census in 2011 counted 5,834 people in 1,573 households. The 2016 census measured the population of the village as 8,626 people in 2,333 households. It was the most populous village in its rural district.
