= Sar Asiab-e Farsangi, Kerman =

Neighborhood in Kerman province, Iran

Sar Asiab-e Farsangi Persian: سرآسياب فرسنگي
- Neighborhood
- Location within Iran
- Coordinates: 30°16′41″N 57°08′32″E
- Country: Iran
- Province: Kerman
- County: Kerman
- District: Central
- City: Kerman
- Time zone: UTC+3:30 (IRST)

Sar Asiab-e Farsangi (Persian: سرآسياب فرسنگي) (Note: Also romanized as Sar Āsīāb-e Farsangī, Sar Āsīāb Farsangī, Sar Āsīyāb Farsangī) is a neighborhood of the city of Kerman in the Central District of Kerman County, Kerman province, Iran. It was the capital of Sar Asiab-e Farsangi Rural District until it merged into the city.
