= Deh Shaib-e Olya =

Deh Shaib-e Olya ده شيب عليا
- Village
- Location within Iran
- Coordinates: 30°30′00″N 57°19′00″E
- Country: Iran
- Province: Kerman
- County: Kerman
- Bakhsh: Central
- Rural District: Derakhtengan

Population (2006)
  - Total: 102
- Time zone: UTC+3:30 (IRST)
  - Summer (DST): UTC+4:30 (IRDT)

Deh Shaib-e Olya (Persian: ده شيب عليا, also Romanized as Deh Sha‘īb-e ‘Olyā; also known as Deh Sha‘īb-e Bālā) is a village in Derakhtengan Rural District, in the Central District of Kerman County, Kerman Province, Iran. At the 2006 census, its population was 102, in 27 families.
