= Deh Shaib =

Deh Shaib (Persian: ده شيب) may refer to:

- Deh Shaib-e Olya
- Deh Shaib-e Sofla
