= Keshit, Kerman =

Village in Kerman province, Iran

Keshit Persian: كشيت
- Village
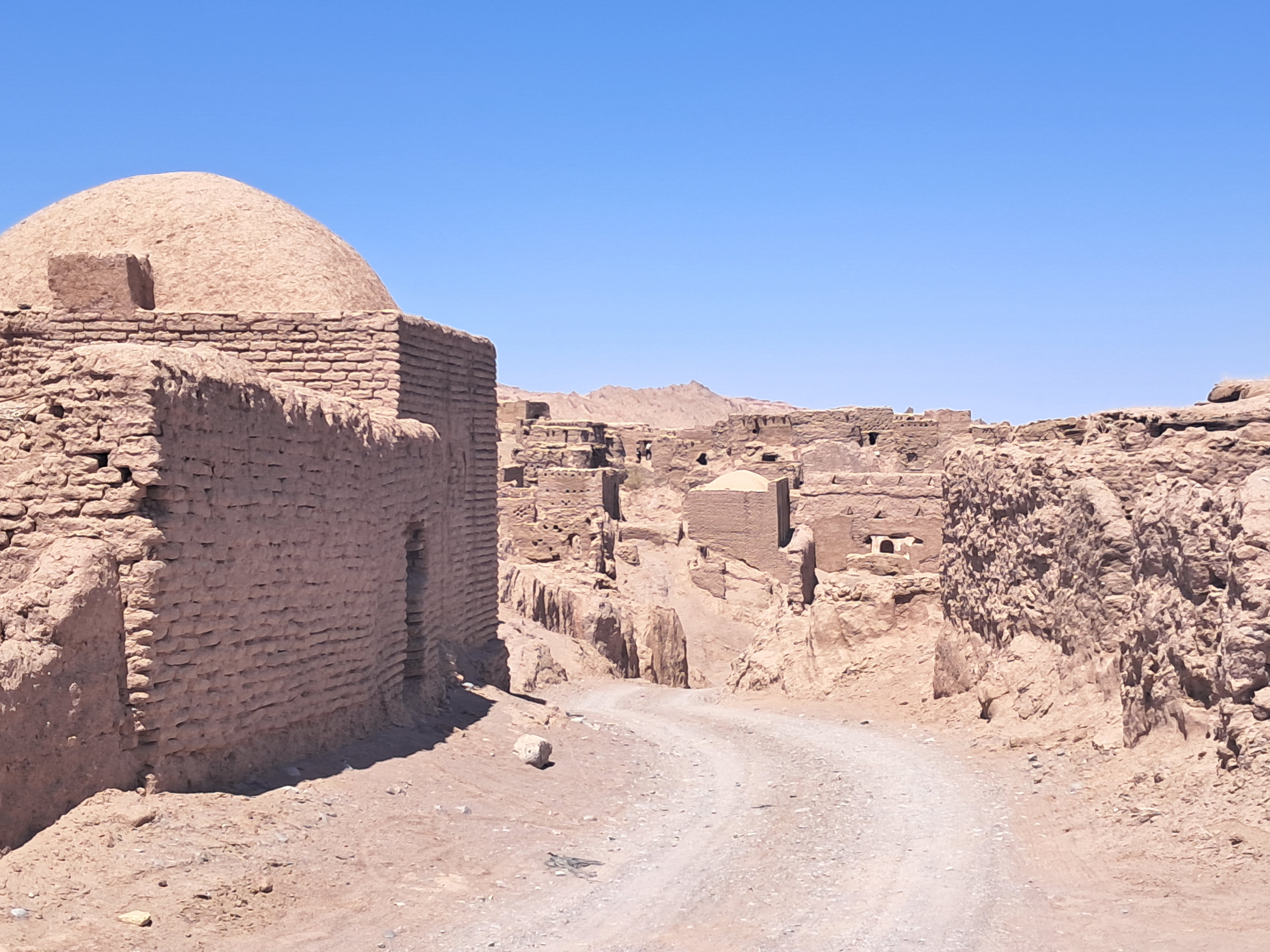

- Location within Iran
- Coordinates: 29°51′06″N 58°08′30″E
- Country: Iran
- Province: Kerman
- County: Kerman
- District: Golbaf
- Rural District: Keshit

Population (2016)
  - Total: 1,249
- Time zone: UTC+3:30 (IRST)

Keshit (Persian: كشيت) (Note: Also romanized as Kashit and Keshīt) is a village in, and the capital of, Keshit Rural District of Golbaf District, Kerman County, Kerman province, Iran.

== Demographics ==
=== Population ===
At the time of the 2006 National Census, the village's population was 1,035 in 230 households. The following census in 2011 counted 1,074 people in 280 households. The 2016 census measured the population of the village as 1,249 people in 330 households. It was the most populous village in its rural district.

== History ==
The ruins of an ancient settlement near Keshit, sometimes referred to as the lost city of Keshit, have been the subject of archaeological interest. These ruins, are believed to date back to the late fourth and third millennia or possibly the Seljuk era around 1050 AD
