= Zayandeh Rud, Kerman =

Zayandeh Rud زاينده رود
- village
- Interactive map of Zayandeh Rud
- Coordinates: 30°7′N 57°38′E
- Country: Iran
- Province: Kerman
- County: Kerman
- Bakhsh: Golbaf
- Rural District: Jowshan

Population (2006)
  - Total: 72
- Time zone: UTC+3:30 (IRST)
  - Summer (DST): UTC+4:30 (IRDT)

Zayandeh Rud (Persian: زاينده رود, also Romanized as Zāyandeh Rūd) is a village in Jowshan Rural District, Golbaf District, Kerman County, Kerman Province, Iran. At the 2006 census, its population was 72, in 20 families.
