= Buj, Iran =

Buj (Persian: بوج) in Iran, may refer to:

- Buj, Kerman
- Buj, South Khorasan
