= Sar Asiab-e Bala =

Sar Asiab-e Bala (Persian: سراسياب بالا) may refer to:

- Sar Asiab-e Bala, Fars
- Sar Asiab-e Bala, Kerman
- Sar Asiab-e Bala, Razavi Khorasan
