= Zamanabad, Kerman =

Zamanabad زمان اباد
- Village
- Location within Iran
- Coordinates: 29°55′09″N 57°42′17″E
- Country: Iran
- Province: Kerman
- County: Kerman
- Bakhsh: Golbaf
- Rural District: Jowshan

Population (2006)
  - Total: 149
- Time zone: UTC+3:30 (IRST)
  - Summer (DST): UTC+4:30 (IRDT)

Zamanabad (Persian: زمان اباد, also Romanized as Zamānābād) is a village in Jowshan Rural District, Golbaf District, Kerman County, Kerman Province, Iran. At the 2006 census, its population was 149, in 32 families.
