= Rustai-ye Chahardeh Masum =

Village in Kerman province, Iran

Rustai-ye Chahardeh Masum Persian: روستاي چهارده معصوم
- Village
- Location within Iran
- Coordinates: 30°21′19″N 56°57′03″E
- Country: Iran
- Province: Kerman
- County: Kerman
- District: Central
- Rural District: Ekhtiarabad

Population (2016)
  - Total: 9,954
- Time zone: UTC+3:30 (IRST)

Rustai-ye Chahardeh Masum (Persian: روستاي چهارده معصوم) (Note: Also romanized as Rūstāyī-ye Chahārdeh Maʿṣūm; also known as Allahābād (الله اباد) and Chahārdahmaʿṣūm) is a village in Ekhtiarabad Rural District of the Central District of Kerman County, Kerman province, Iran.

== Demographics ==
=== Population ===
At the time of the 2006 National Census, the village's population was 428 in 107 households. The following census in 2011 counted 9,844 people in 2,621 households. The 2016 census measured the population of the village as 9,954 people in 2,863 households. It was the most populous village in its rural district.
