= Sar Asiab-e Pain =

Sar Asiab-e Pain (Persian: سراسياب پايين) may refer to:

- Sar Asiab-e Pain, Fars
- Sar Asiab-e Pain, Kerman
- Sar Asiab-e Pain, Razavi Khorasan
