= Sharafabad, Kerman =

Village in Kerman province, Iran

Sharafabad Persian: شرف اباد
- Village
- Location within Iran
- Coordinates: 30°19′14″N 57°00′21″E
- Country: Iran
- Province: Kerman
- County: Kerman
- District: Central
- Rural District: Zangiabad

Population (2016)
  - Total: 8,570
- Time zone: UTC+3:30 (IRST)

Sharafabad (Persian: شرف اباد) (Note: Also romanized as Sharafābād) is a village in Zangiabad Rural District of the Central District of Kerman County, Kerman province, Iran.

== Demographics ==
=== Population ===
At the time of the 2006 National Census, the village's population was 5,699 in 1,315 households. The following census in 2011 counted 6,780 people in 1,771 households. The 2016 census measured the population of the village as 8,570 people in 2,267 households. It was the most populous village in its rural district.
