= Hoseynabad-e Khan, Sar Asiab-e Farsangi =

Village in Kerman province, Iran

Hoseynabad-e Khan Persian: حسين ابادخان
- Village
- Location within Iran
- Coordinates: 30°14′55″N 57°11′02″E
- Country: Iran
- Province: Kerman
- County: Kerman
- District: Central
- Rural District: Sar Asiab-e Farsangi

Population (2016)
  - Total: 619
- Time zone: UTC+3:30 (IRST)

Hoseynabad-e Khan (Persian: حسين ابادخان) (Note: Also romanized as Ḩoseynābād Khān and Ḩoseynābād-e Khān; also known as Hosein Abad Zangi Abad, Ḩoseynābād, Ḩoseynābād-e Bīglar Bīgī, Ḩoseynābād-e Zangīābād, and Husainābād) is a village in Sar Asiab-e Farsangi Rural District of the Central District of Kerman County, Kerman province, Iran.

== Demographics ==
=== Population ===
At the time of the 2006 National Census, the village's population was 546 in 125 households. The following census in 2011 counted 637 people in 180 households. The 2016 census measured the population of the village as 174 households. It was the most populous village in its rural district.
