= Deh Shaib-e Sofla =

Village in Kerman, Iran

Deh Shaib-e Sofla ده شيب سفلي
- Village
- Location within Iran
- Coordinates: 30°29′31″N 57°19′07″E
- Country: Iran
- Province: Kerman
- County: Kerman
- Bakhsh: Central
- Rural District: Derakhtengan

Population (2006)
  - Total: 45
- Time zone: UTC+3:30 (IRST)
  - Summer (DST): UTC+4:30 (IRDT)

Deh Shaib-e Sofla (Persian: ده شيب سفلي, also Romanized as Deh Sha‘īb-e Soflá; also known as Deh Sha‘īb and Deh Sha‘īb-e Pā’īn) is a village in Derakhtengan Rural District, in the Central District of Kerman County, Kerman Province, Iran. At the 2006 census, its population was 45, in 12 families.
