= Fathabad Castle =

Castle in Kerman Province, Iran

Fathabad castle
- قلعه فتح‌آباد
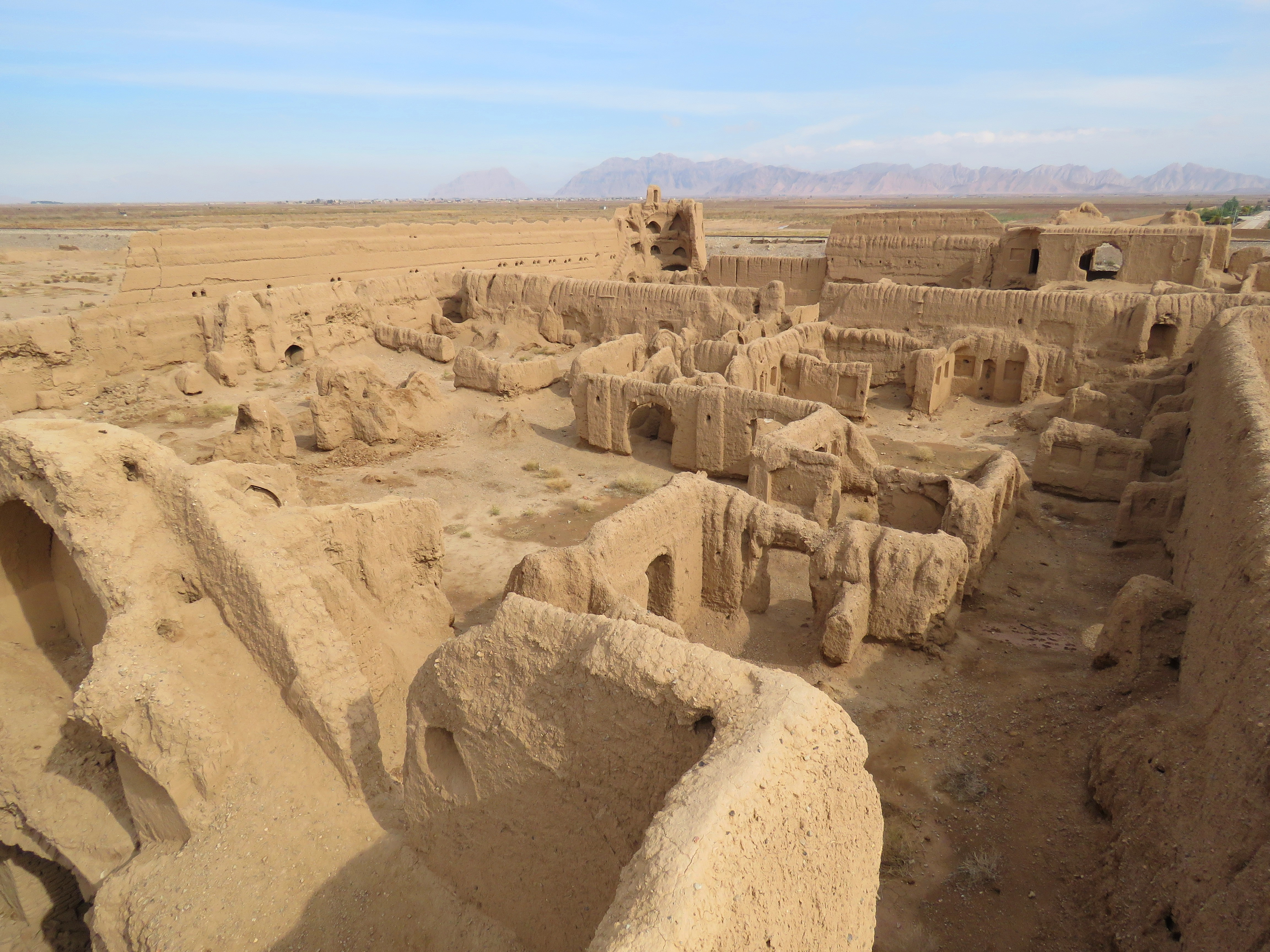
- Interactive map of the Fathabad castle area

General information
- Type: Castle
- Location: Kerman, Iran

Fathabad castle (Persian: قلعه فتح‌آباد) is a historical castle located in Kerman County in Kerman Province,

Fath Abad Garden is a nearby structure.
