= Sar Asiab-e Farsangi =

Sar Asiab-e Farsangi or Sar Asiab Farsangi or Sar Asiyab Farsangi (Persian: سرآسياب فرسنگي) may refer to:

- Sar Asiab-e Farsangi, Derakhtengan
- Sar Asiab-e Farsangi Rural District
