= Zayandeh Rud (disambiguation) =

Zayandeh Rud is a city in Isfahan Province, Iran.

Zayandeh Rud (Persian: زاينده رود) may also refer to:

- Zayanderud, a river of Iran
- Zayandeh Rud, Kerman, a village in Golbaf District, Kerman County, Kerman province, Iran
- Zayandehrud District, a district in Chaharmahal and Bakhtiari province, Iran
- Zayandeh Rud-e Jonubi Rural District, a rural district in Chaharmahal and Bakhtiari province, Iran
- Zayandeh Rud-e Shomali Rural District, a rural district in Isfahan province, Iran

== See also ==
- Zayandeh Rud Cultural and Recreational Village, Isfahan province
- Zayandeh Rud Dam Complex, Isfahan province
