= Fath Abad Garden =

Garden in Ekhtiarabad, Kerman, Iran

Coordinates: 30°20′44″N 56°55′08″E

Fathabad Garden
- باغ فتح آباد
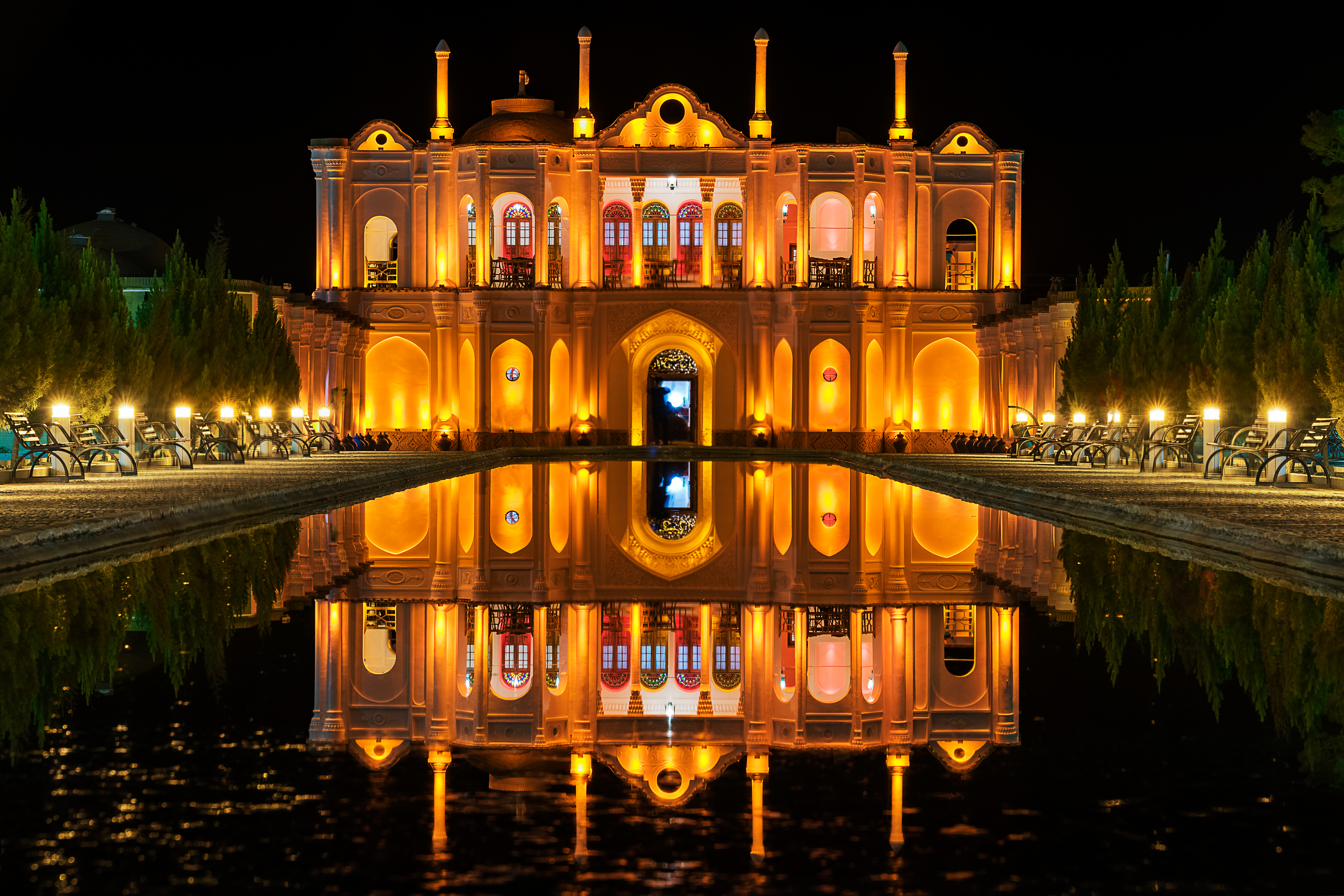
- Interactive map of the Fathabad Garden area
- Alternative names: Biglarbeigi Garden

General information
- Status: Open
- Location: Ekhtiarabad, Iran

The Fathabad Garden (Persian: باغ فتح آباد, romanized: Bagh-e Fath Abad) is a historic garden in Ekhtiarabad, Kerman province, Iran. It was built during the Qajar era in a location 25 kilometers north-west of Kerman.

Fathabad Castle is a structure nearby.

== History and description ==
The garden was created in 1876 and with an area of 13 hectares by Fazlali Khan Biglarbeigi who was the governor of Kerman at the time. The garden includes a two-story mansion at the northern end of the garden. The building with arches on both sides and three-door and five-door rooms in the middle has a unique architecture of the European-Iranian style that has modeled the historical Shazdeh Garden in Mahan.

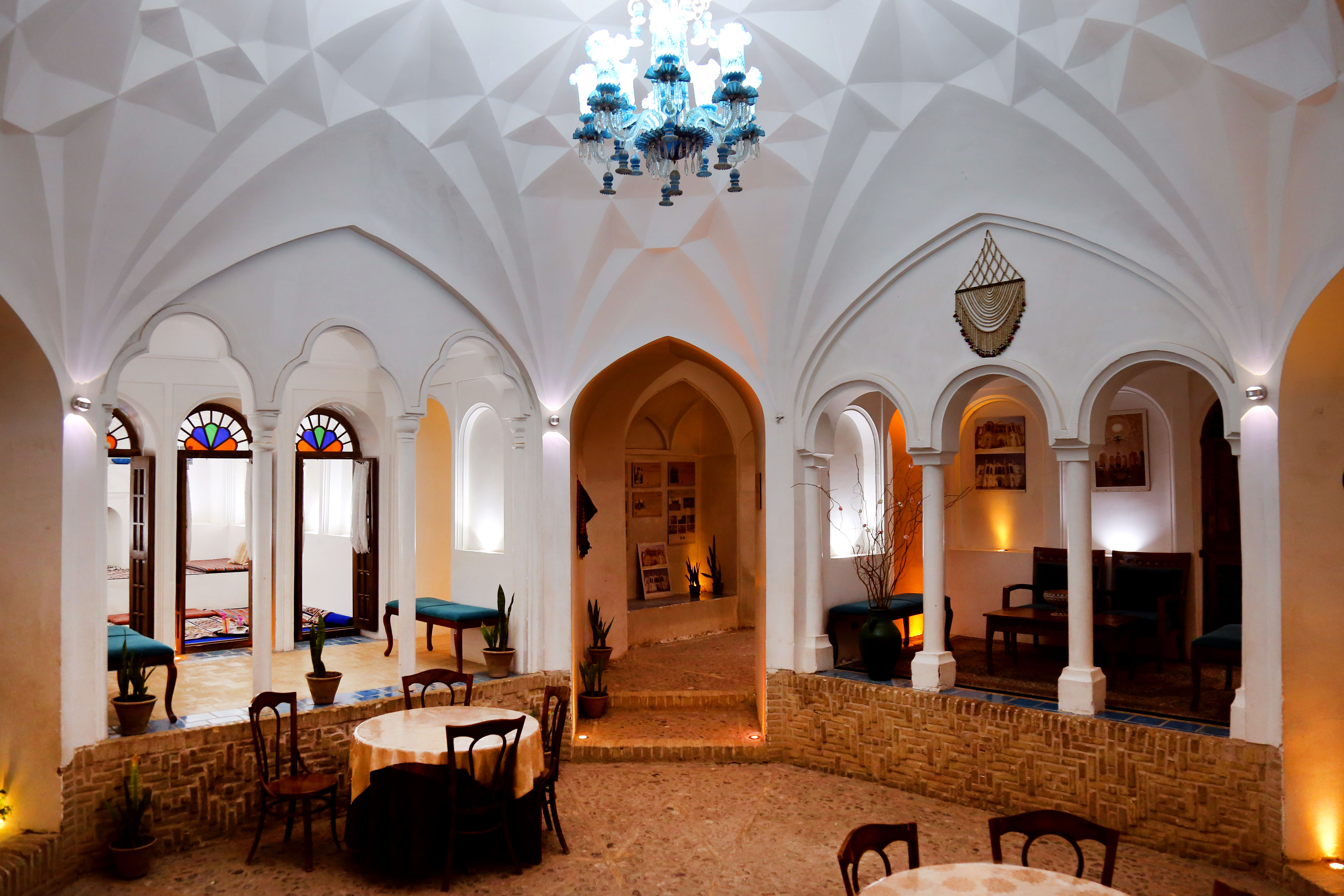
The hashti of Fath Abad mansion, 2022

It was listed among the national heritage sites of Iran with the number 7284 on 1 February 2003.

== Gallery ==
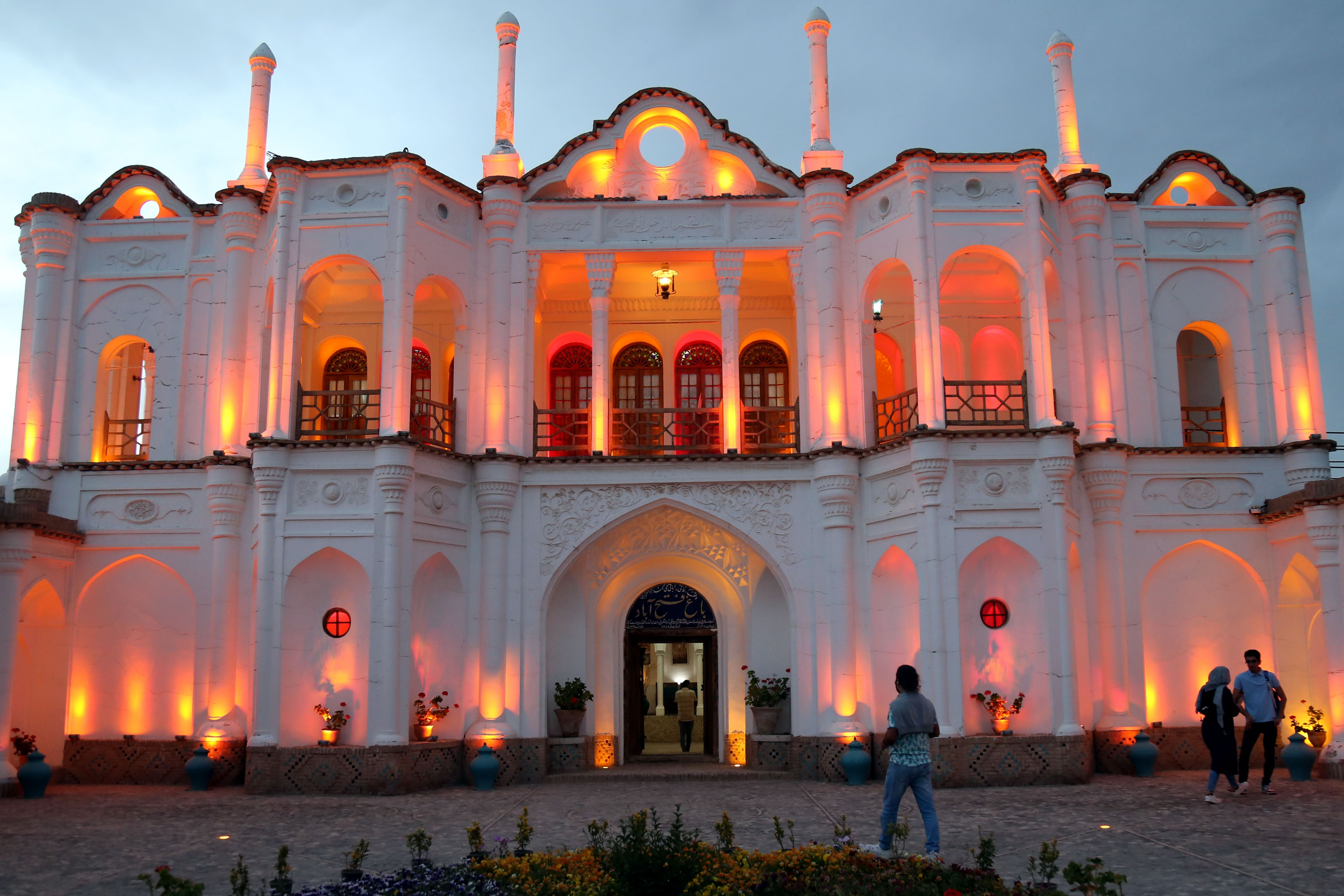
Fath Abad Garden, 2022

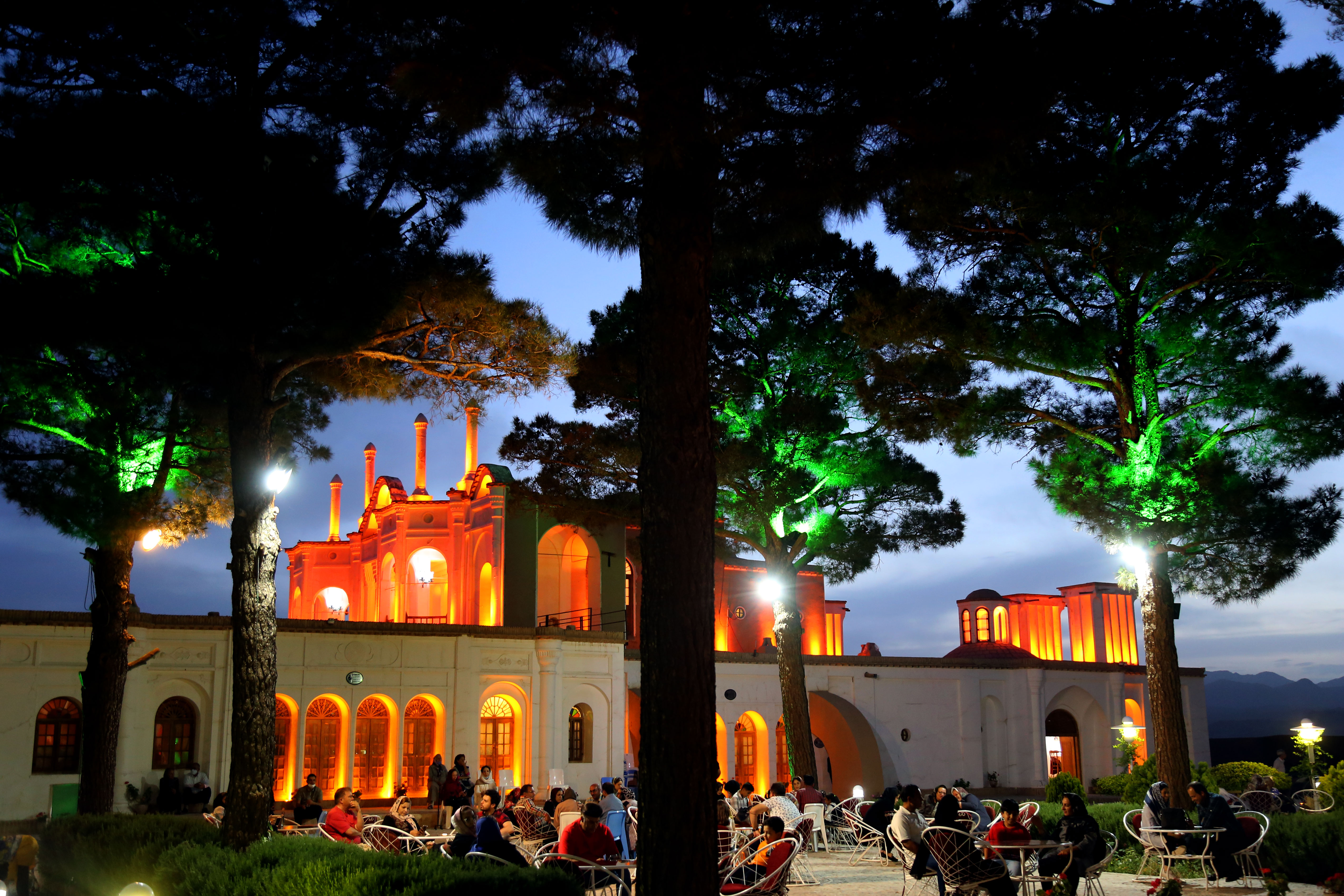
Fath Abad Garden, 2022

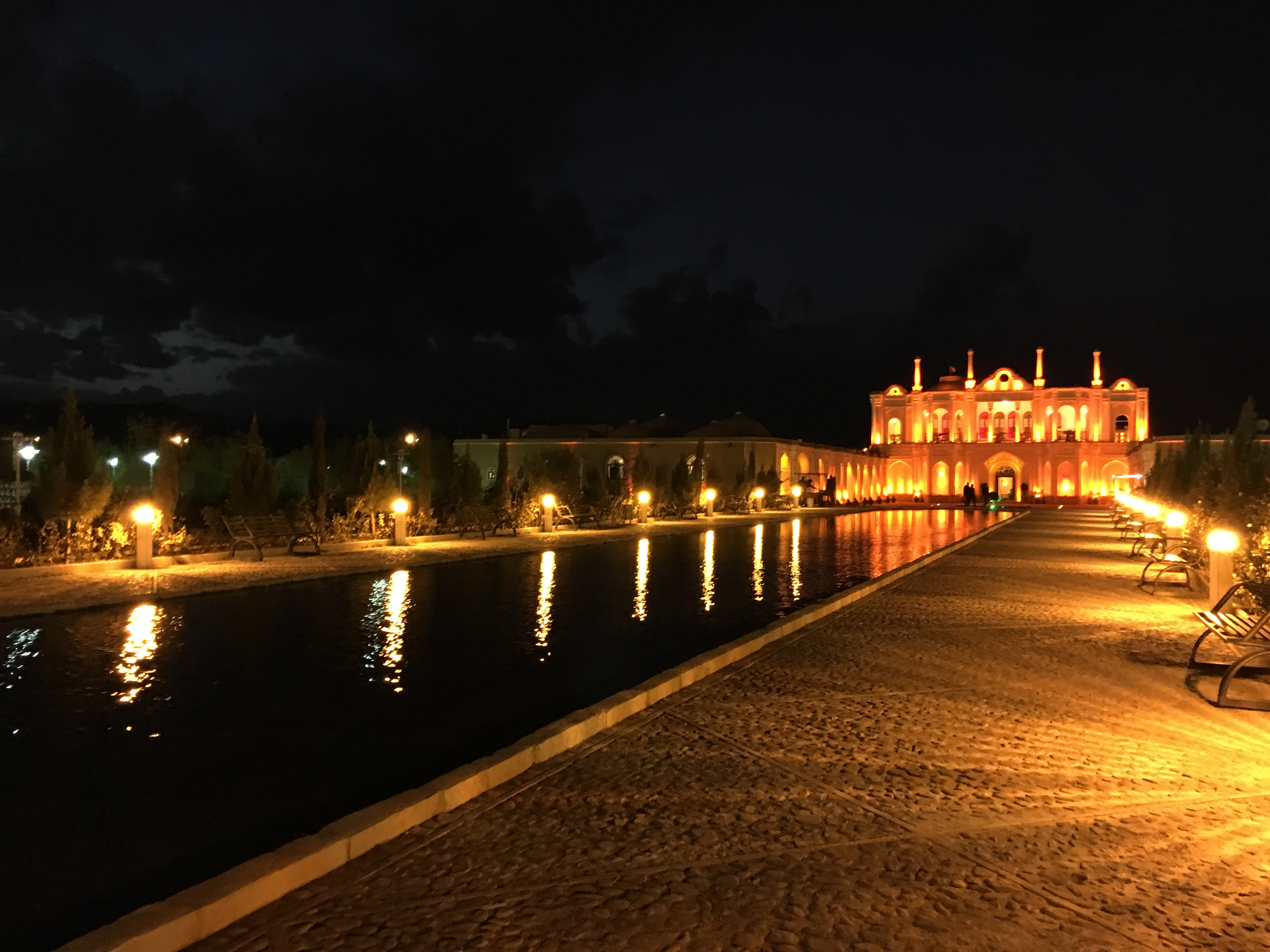
Fath Abad Garden, 2016

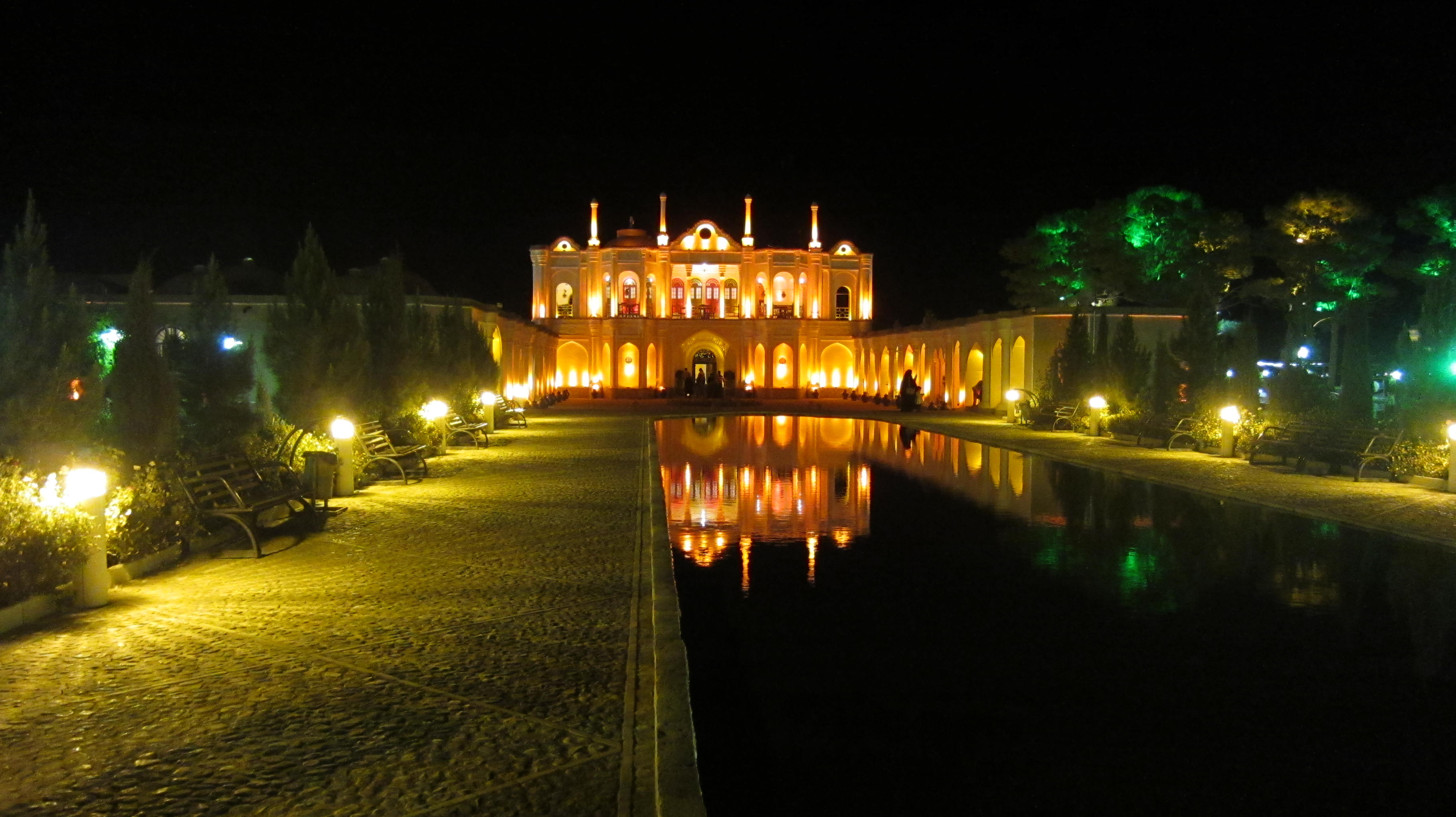
Fath Abad Garden, 2018

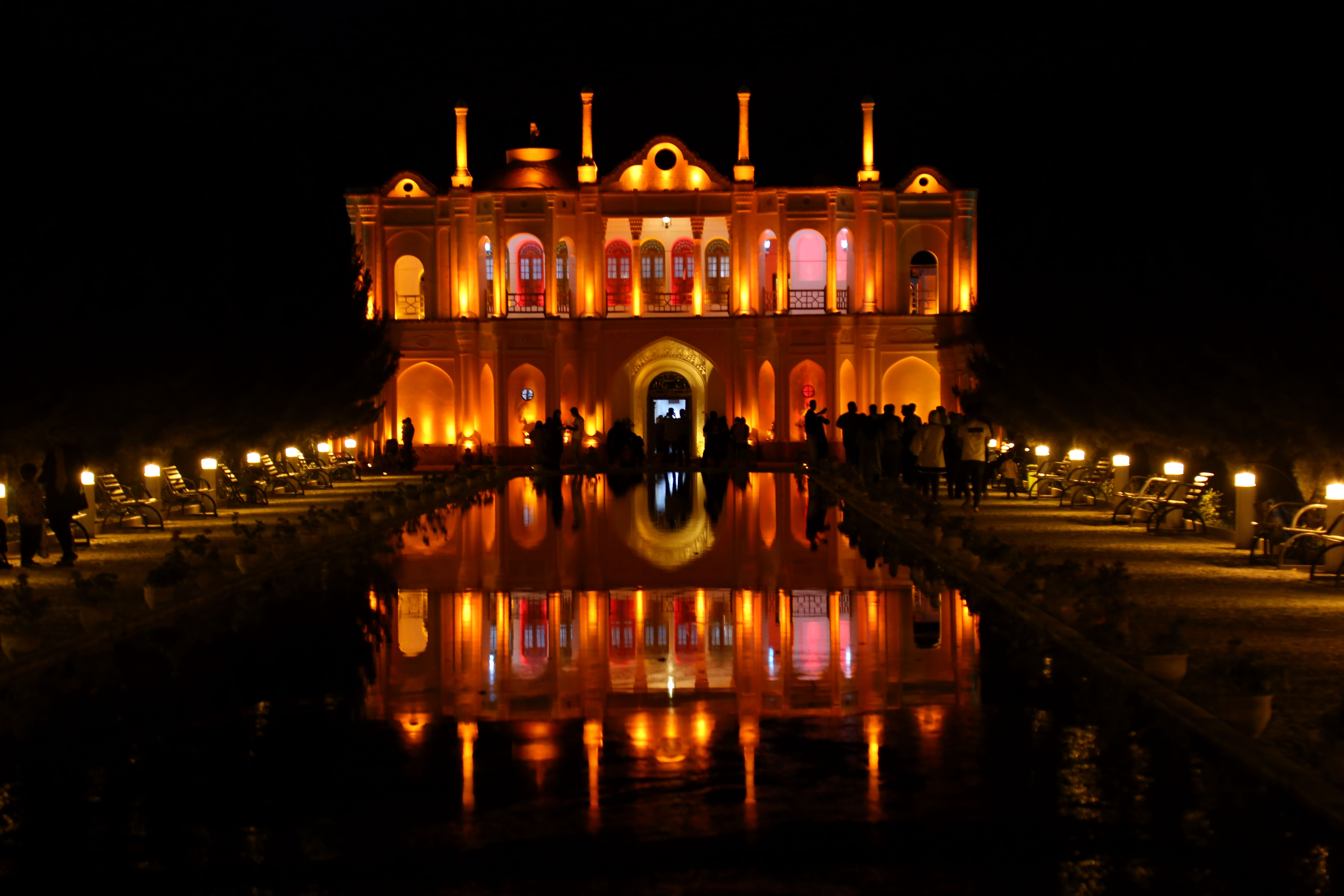
Fath Abad Garden, 2022

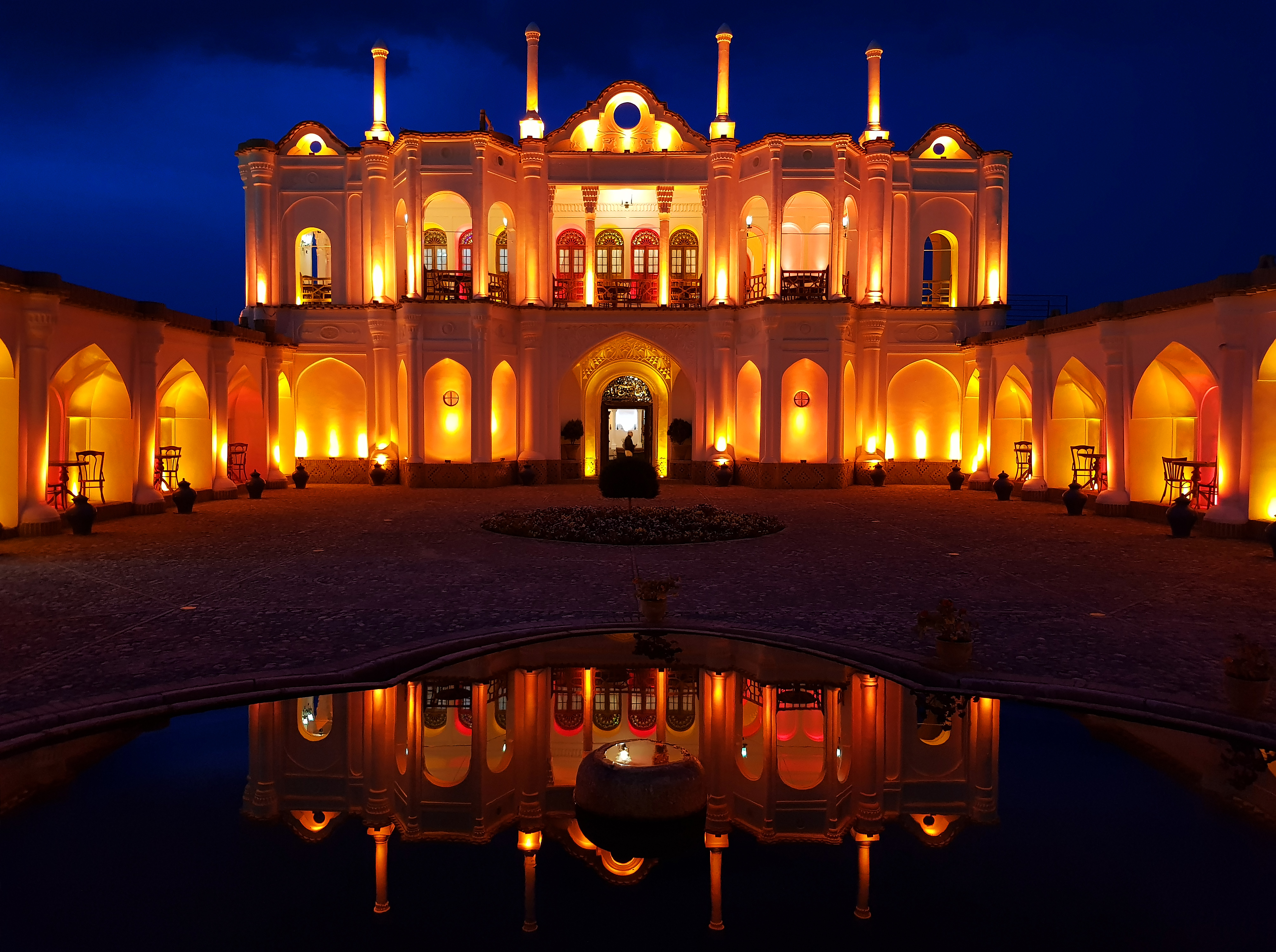
Fath Abad Garden, 2018

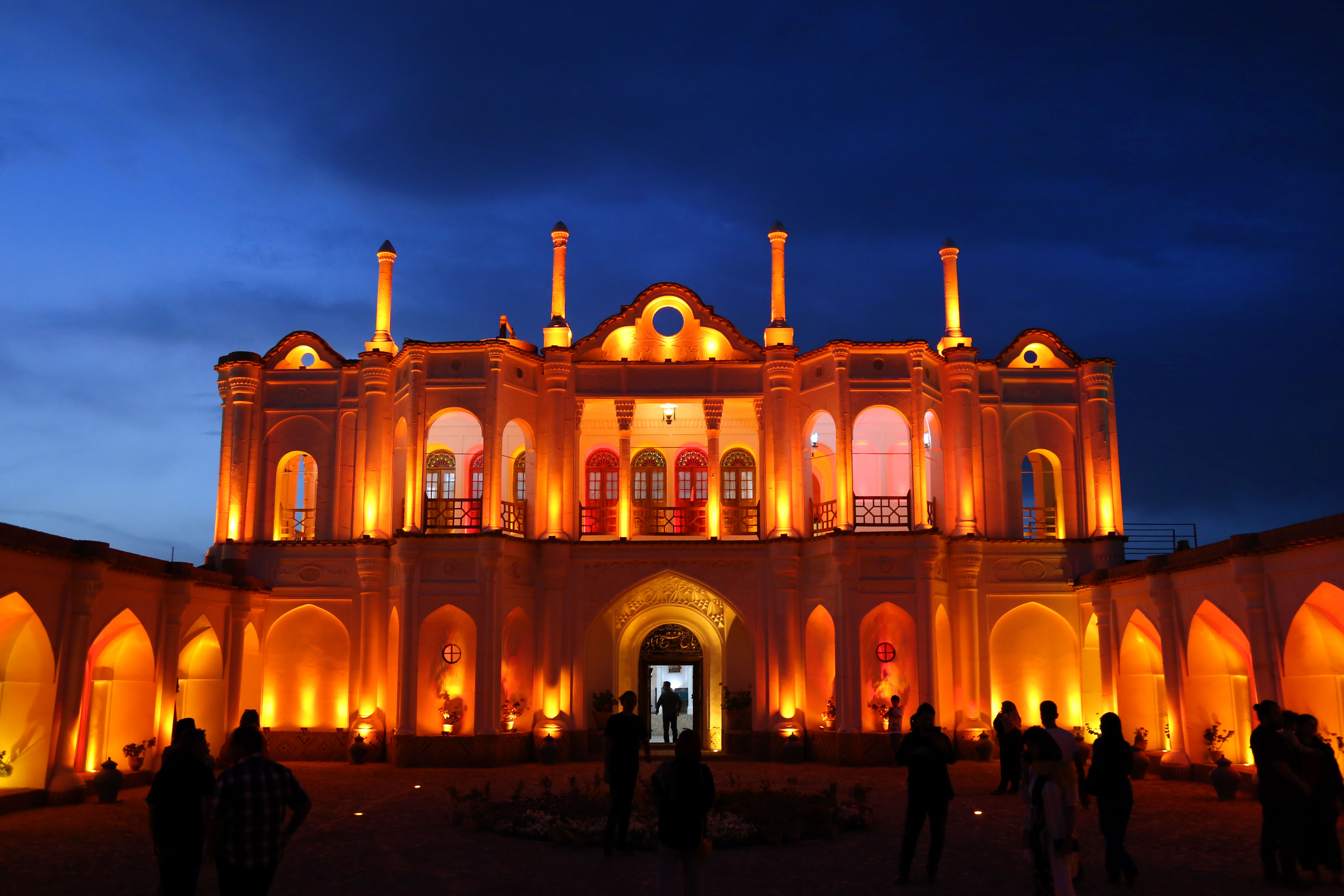
Fath Abad Garden, 2022

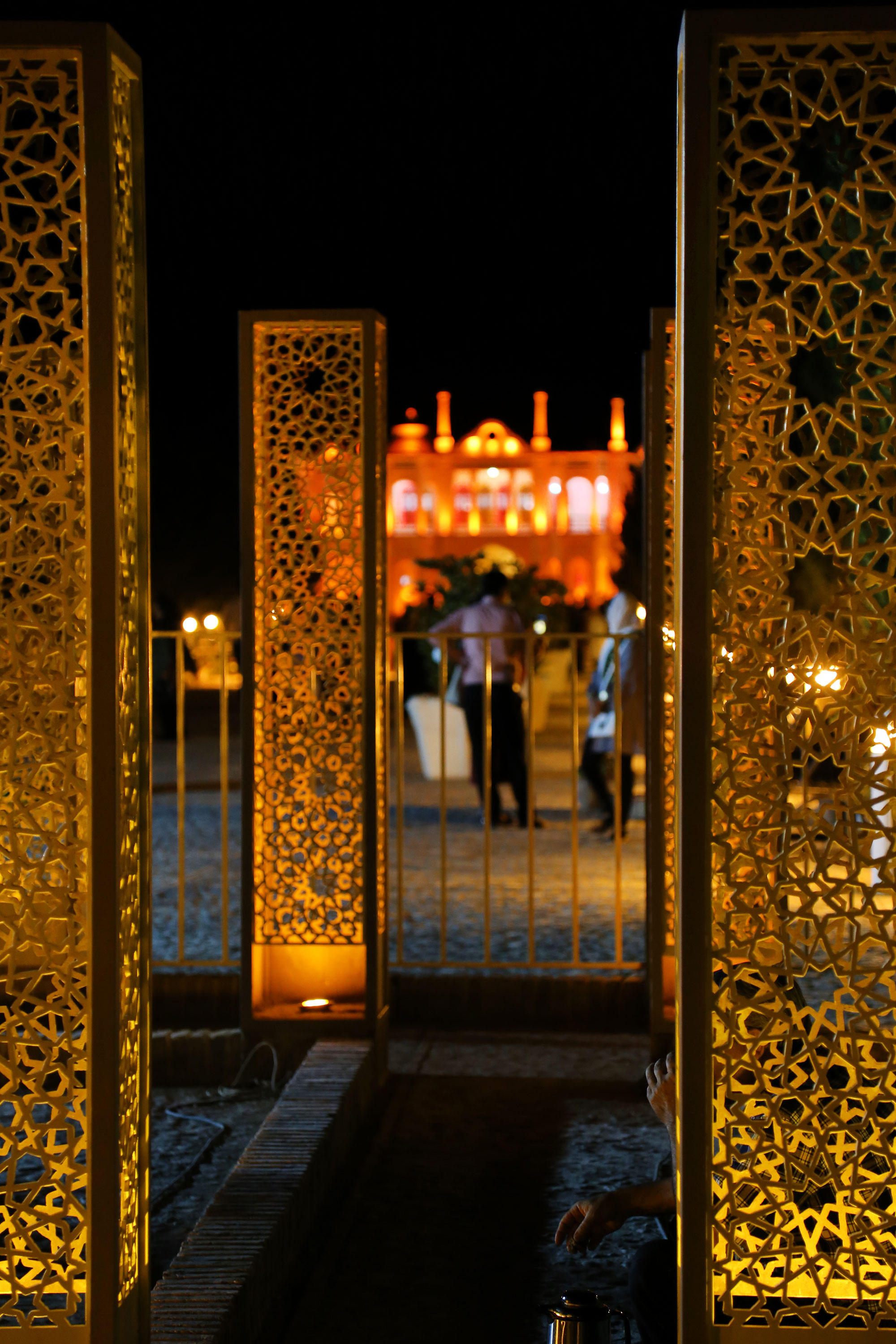
Fath Abad Garden, 2022
