= Deh-e Hasanali =

Deh-e Hasanali or Deh-e Hasan Ali (Persian: ده حسنعلي) may refer to:

- Deh-e Hasan Ali, Kerman
- Deh-e Hasanali, Lorestan
