= Jushan, Kerman =

Village in Kerman province, Iran

Jushan Persian: جوشان
- Village
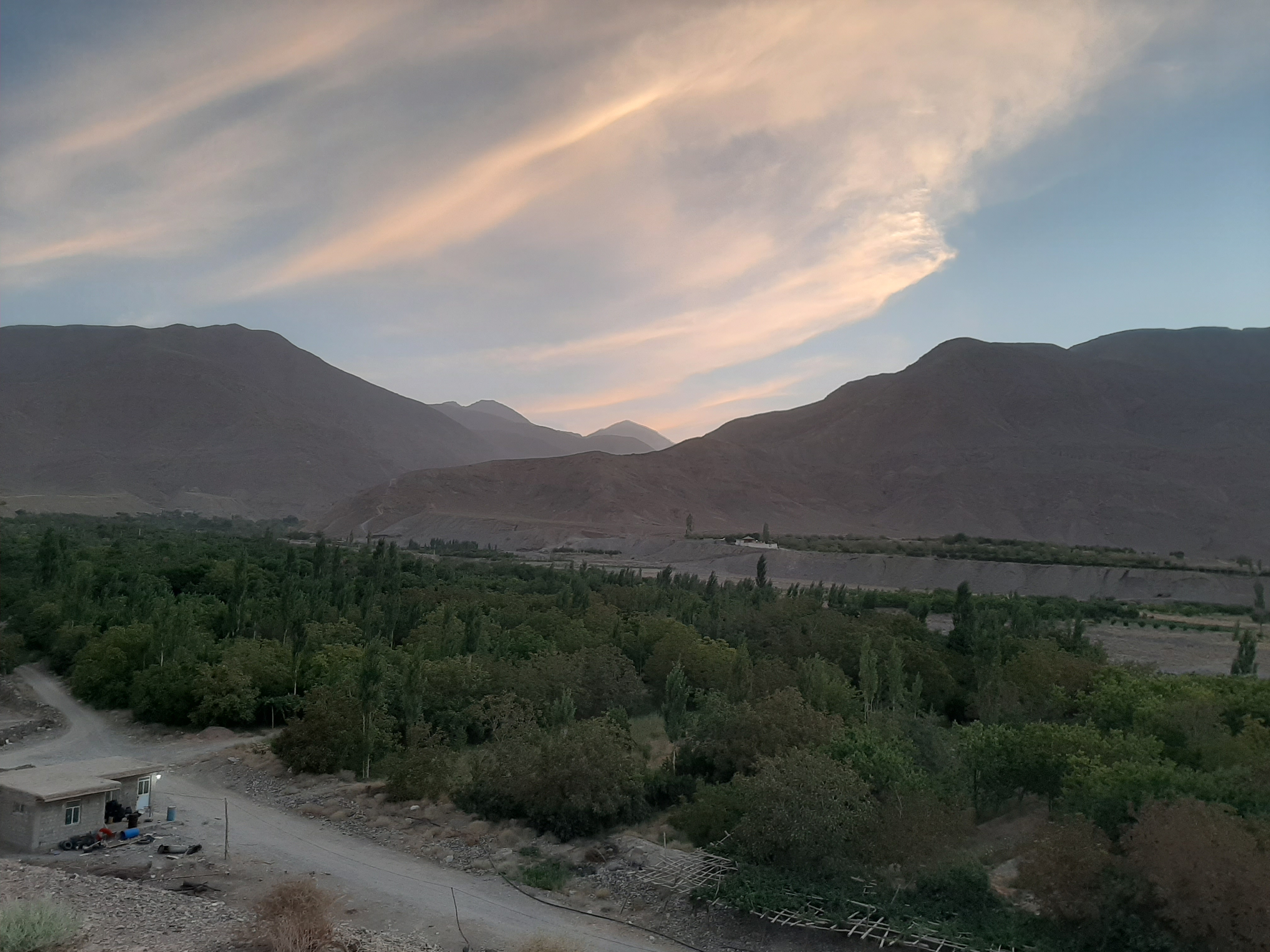
- Jushan

- Location within Iran
- Coordinates: 30°07′13″N 57°36′17″E
- Country: Iran
- Province: Kerman
- County: Kerman
- District: Golbaf
- Rural District: Jushan

Population (2016)
  - Total: 1,444
- Time zone: UTC+3:30 (IRST)

Jushan (Persian: جوشان) (Note: Also romanized as Jowshan and Jowshān; also known as Jūishān and Juyi Shān) is a village in, and the capital of, Jushan Rural District of Golbaf District, Kerman County, Kerman province, Iran.

== Demographics ==
=== Population ===
At the time of the 2006 National Census, the village's population was 1,420 in 326 households. The following census in 2011 counted 913 people in 284 households. The 2016 census measured the population of the village as 1,444 people in 451 households. It was the most populous village in its rural district.
