= Ardeshir Castle =

Castle in Kerman Province, Iran

- قلعه اردشیر
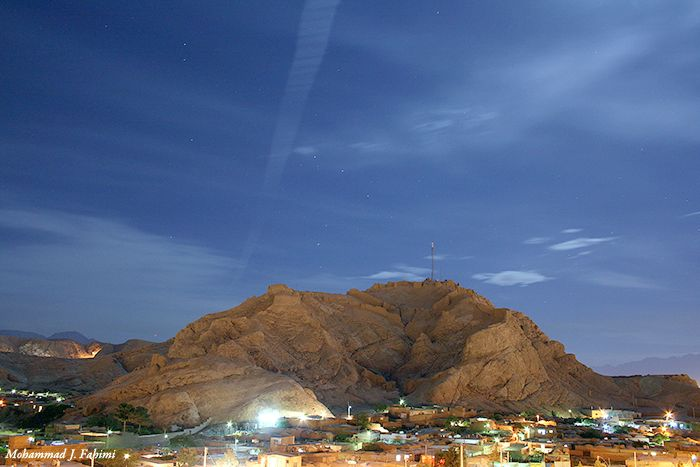

- Location within Iran

General information
- Type: Castle
- Location: Kerman, Iran
- Coordinates: 30°17′19″N 57°06′02″E
- Renovation cost

Iran National Heritage List
- Official name: Ardashir Castle
- Type: Ruins
- Designated: 1966
- Reference no.: 524
- Conservation organization: Cultural Heritage, Handicrafts and Tourism Organization of Iran

Ardeshir Castle (Persian: قلعه اردشیر) is a historical castle located in Kerman County in Kerman Province, The longevity of this fortress dates back to the Sasanian Empire.
