= Ganj Ali Khan Castle =

Castle in Kerman Province, Iran

Coordinates: 30°17′42.9″N 57°17′24.1″E

Ganj Ali Khan castle
- قلعه گنجعلیخان
- Interactive map of the Ganj Ali Khan castle area

General information
- Type: Castle
- Location: Kerman County, Iran

Ganj Ali Khan castle (Persian: قلعه گنجعلیخان) is a historical castle located in Kerman County in Kerman Province, The longevity of this fortress dates back to the Safavid dynasty.
