= Bowj =

Bowj بوج
- Village
- Location within Iran
- Coordinates: 30°22′41″N 56°41′51″E
- Country: Iran
- Province: Kerman
- County: Kerman
- Bakhsh: Central
- Rural District: Ekhtiarabad

Population (2006)
  - Total: 132
- Time zone: UTC+3:30 (IRST)

Bowj (Persian: بوج, also Romanized as Būj; also known as Borj, Bowi, and Būzh) is a village in Ekhtiarabad Rural District, in the Central District of Kerman County, Kerman Province, Iran. At the 2006 census, its population was 132, in 32 families.
