= Hashti =

Iranian architectural element

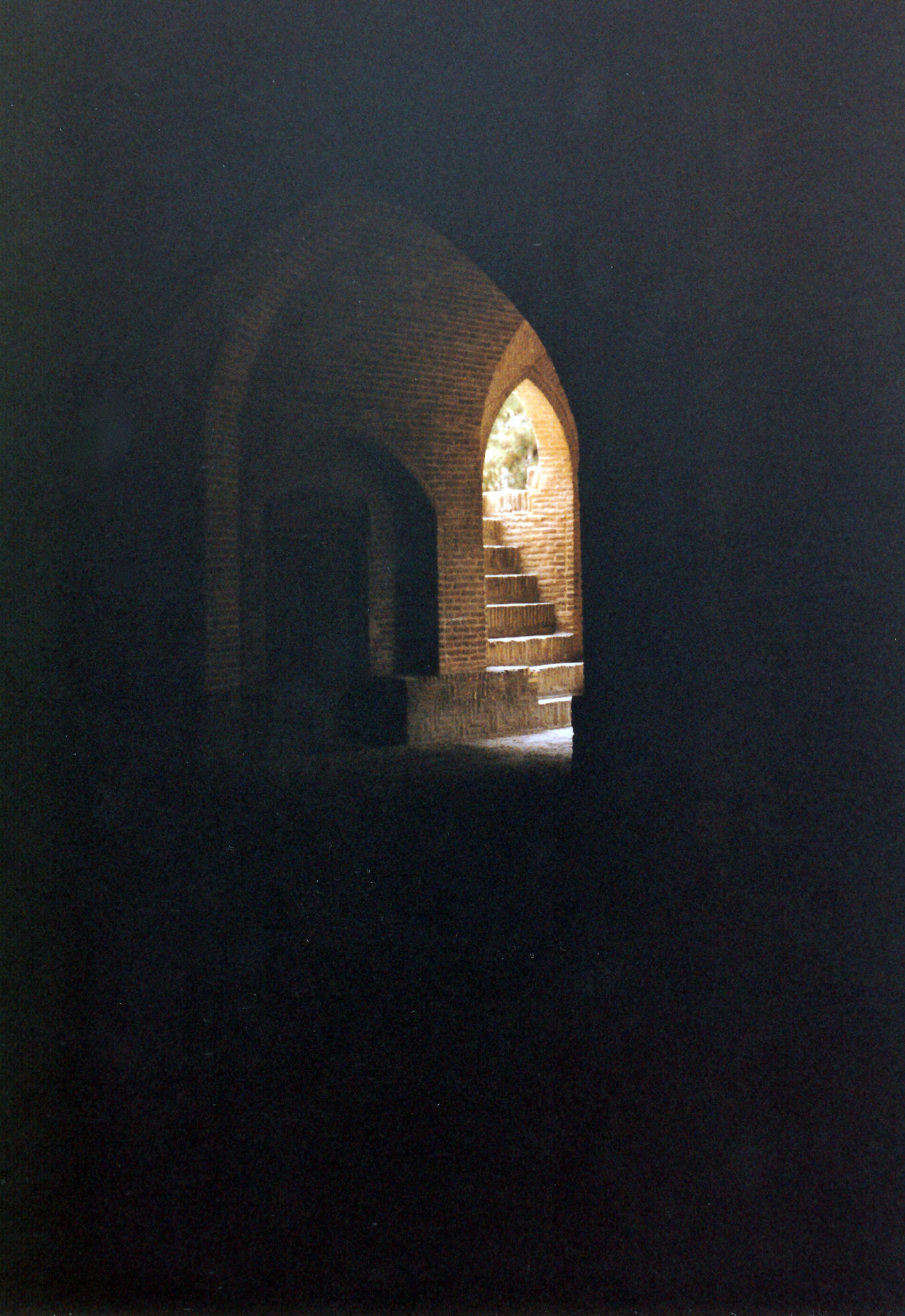
Hashti at the Shah Mosque of Semnan leading to curved spaces.

Hashti (Persian: هشتی), or Dalan-e voroudi, in most traditional houses and buildings in Iran, is the space behind the sar-dar (doorway). The term, which is derived from the Iranian word hasht or eight, refers to its design as an octagonal space. However, hashtis are constructed in many different shapes such as hexagonal, square and rectangular designs.

In more luxurious homes, the hashti has more ornamentation and a seating area. After the hashti, a series of curved and narrow spaces called "rahro" follow, which usually lead to the home's courtyard. In formal buildings such as citadels and shrines, this space can lead to an arched colonnade that forms a ceremonial passageway. In a mosque, the hashti is designed so as to guide the visitor through purification before prayer. The hashti in Isfahan's Shah Mosque (Imam Mosque) is an example of this. It leads to the mosque and is constructed next to the Pishkhan, which serves as the entryway that invites people into the building.

The hashti is considered a mediatory space between the gate and the interior spaces of a building. When approached from its relationship with the doorway, the hashti is seen as part of the oscillation between participation and distance, activity, and passivity, and detail and whole, among other related perspectives.

== Gallery ==
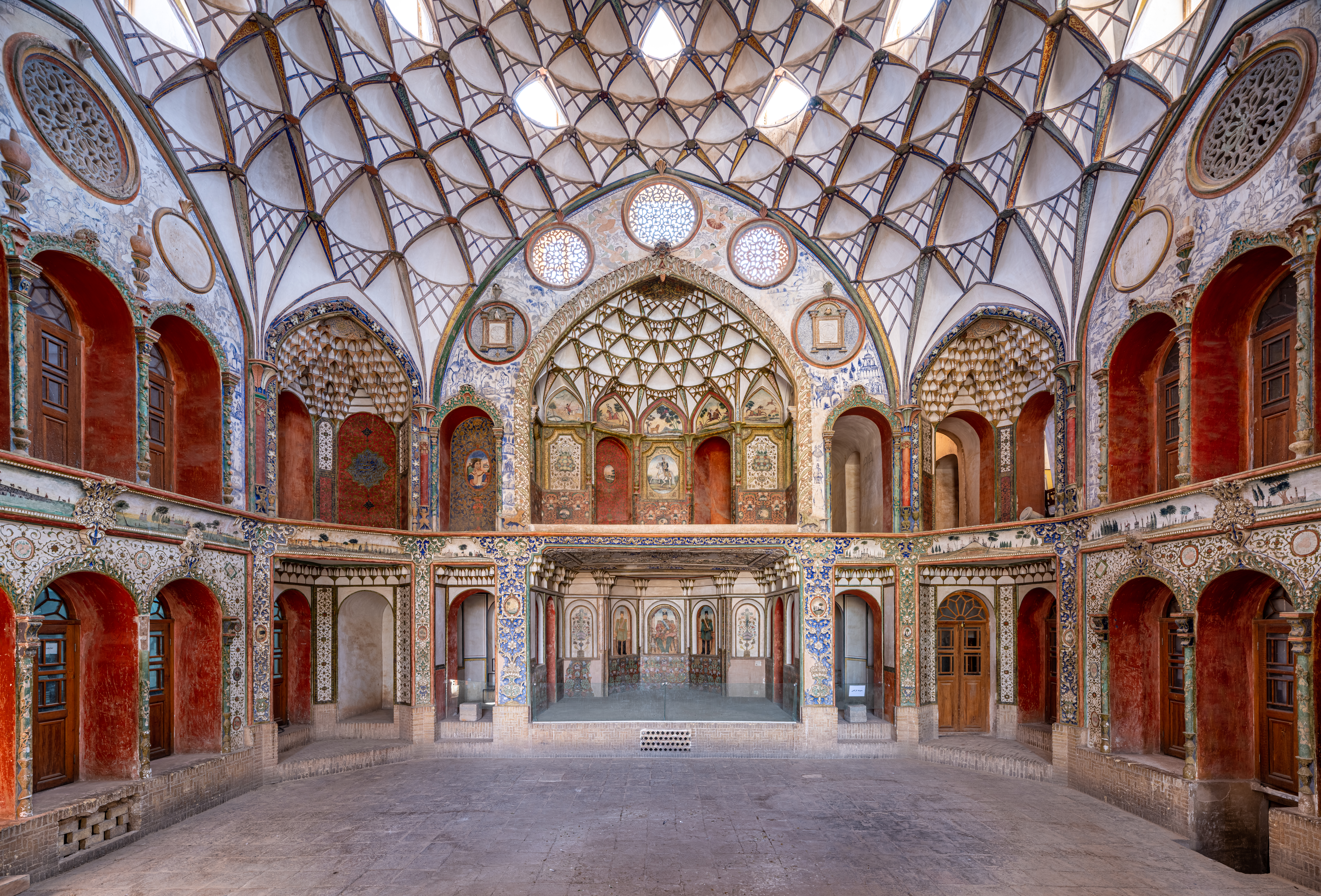
Hashti at Borujerdi House in Kashan

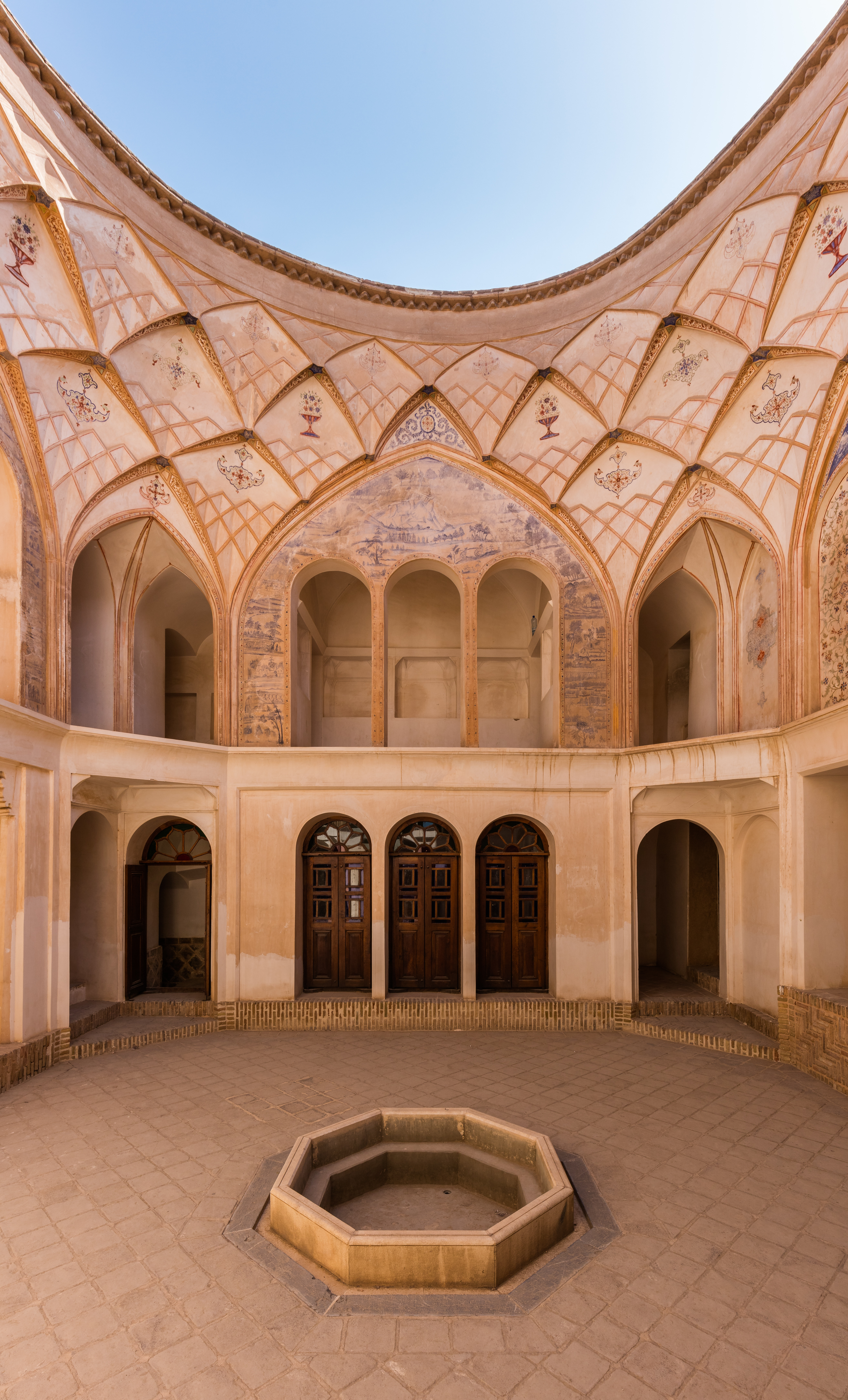
Hashti at Tabatabai House in Kashan

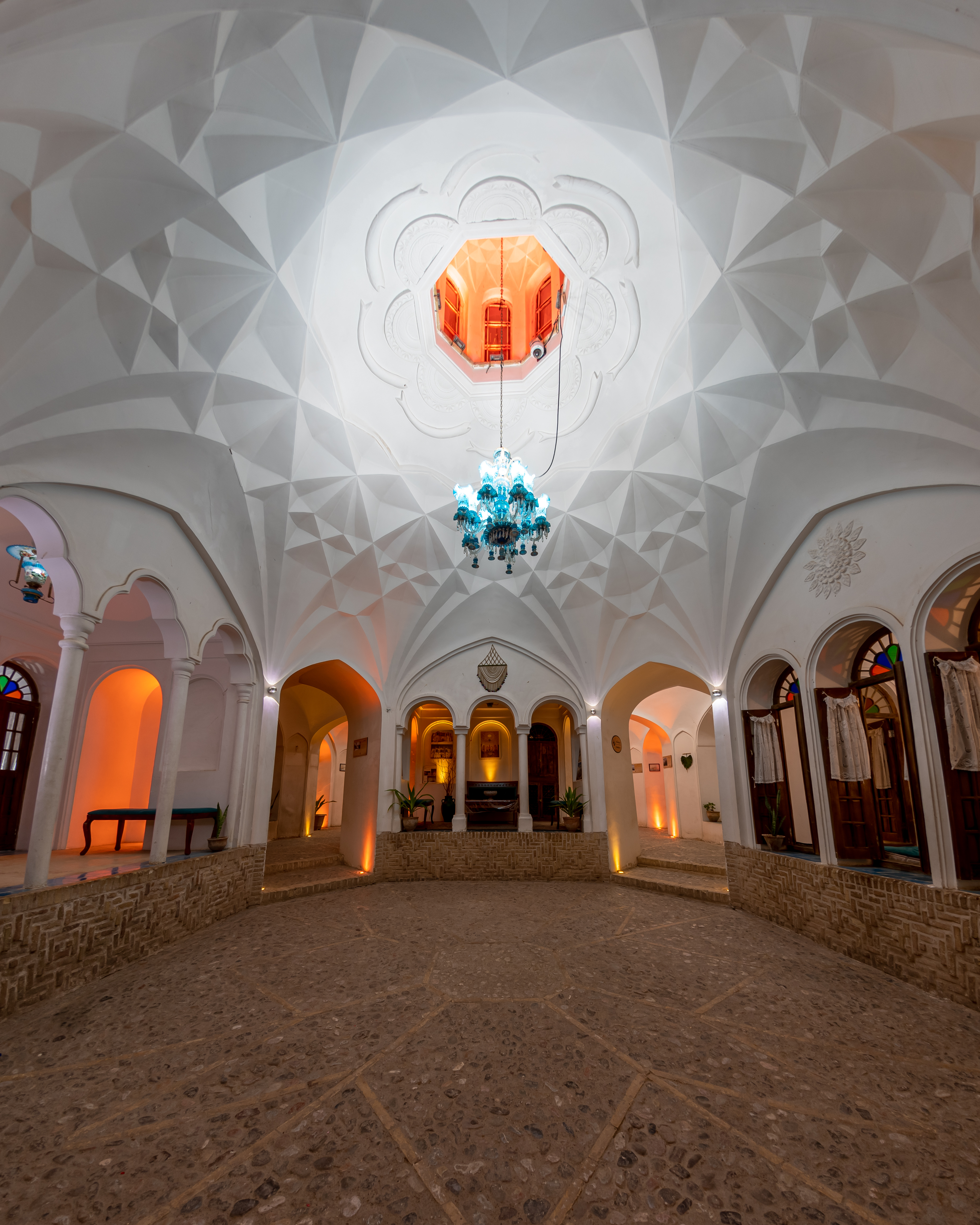
Hashti at Fath Abad Garden in Ekhtiarabad
