= Golbaf =

City in Kerman province, Iran

Golbaf Persian: گلباف
- City
- Location within Iran
- Coordinates: 29°52′58″N 57°43′56″E
- Country: Iran
- Province: Kerman
- County: Kerman
- District: Golbaf

Population (2016)
  - Total: 9,205
- Time zone: UTC+3:30 (IRST)

Golbaf (Persian: گلباف) (Note: Also romanized as Golbāf; also known as Gowk) is a city in, and the capital of, Golbaf District of Kerman County, Kerman province, Iran.

== Demographics ==
=== Population ===
At the time of the 2006 National Census, the city's population was 8,341 in 2,039 households. The following census in 2011 counted 8,828 people in 2,328 households. The 2016 census measured the population of the city as 9,205 people in 2,869 households.
