= Sar Asiab-e Bala, Kerman =

Sar Asiab-e Bala سراسياب بالا
- Village
- Location within Iran
- Coordinates: 30°16′26″N 57°08′13″E
- Country: Iran
- Province: Kerman
- County: Kerman
- Bakhsh: Central
- Rural District: Derakhtengan

Population (2006)
  - Total: 67
- Time zone: UTC+3:30 (IRST)
  - Summer (DST): UTC+4:30 (IRDT)

Sar Asiab-e Bala (Persian: سراسياب بالا, also Romanized as Sar Āsīāb-e Bālā' also known as Sar Āsīāb, Sar Āsīāb-e Farsangī, Sar Āsīāb Farsangī, Sar Āsīyāb Farsangī, and Sar Āsyāb) is a village in Derakhtengan Rural District, in the Central District of Kerman County, Kerman Province, Iran. At the 2006 census, its population was 67, in 17 families.
