= Baghin, Iran =

City in Kerman province, Iran

Baghin Persian: باغين
- City
- Location within Iran
- Coordinates: 30°11′02″N 56°48′27″E
- Country: Iran
- Province: Kerman
- County: Kerman
- District: Central

Population (2016)
  - Total: 10,407
- Time zone: UTC+3:30 (IRST)

Baghin (Persian: باغين) (Note: Also romanized as Bāghīn and Bagin; also known as Gachin) is a city in the Central District of Kerman County, Kerman province, Iran, serving as the administrative center for Baghin Rural District.

== Demographics ==
=== Population ===
At the time of the 2006 National Census, the city's population was 7,616 in 1,903 households. The following census in 2011 counted 8,176 people in 2,198 households. The 2016 census measured the population of the city as 10,407 people in 3,533 households.
