= Zangiabad =

City in Kerman province, Iran

Zangiabad Persian: زنگي آباد
- City
- Location within Iran
- Coordinates: 30°24′28″N 56°54′55″E
- Country: Iran
- Province: Kerman
- County: Kerman
- District: Central

Population (2016)
  - Total: 8,568
- Time zone: UTC+3:30 (IRST)

Zangiabad (Persian: زنگي آباد) (Note: Also romanized as Zangīābād) is a city in the Central District of Kerman County, Kerman province, Iran, serving as the administrative center for Zangiabad Rural District.

== Demographics ==
=== Population ===
At the time of the 2006 National Census, the city's population was 6,666 in 1,598 households. The following census in 2011 counted 6,823 people in 1,791 households. The 2016 census measured the population of the city as 8,568 people in 2,426 households.
