= Sar Asiab-e Shesh =

Village in Kerman, Iran

Sar Asiab-e Shesh سراسياب شش
- Village
- Location within Iran
- Coordinates: 30°32′04″N 56°57′36″E
- Country: Iran
- Province: Kerman
- County: Kerman
- Bakhsh: Chatrud
- Rural District: Moezziyeh

Population (2006)
  - Total: 1,968
- Time zone: UTC+3:30 (IRST)
  - Summer (DST): UTC+4:30 (IRDT)

Sar Asiab-e Shesh (Persian: سراسياب شش, also Romanized as Sar Āsīab-e Shesh, Sar Asīab-e Shesh, and Sar Āsyāb-e Shesh; also known as Sar Āsīāb, Sar Āsīāb-e Shesh Farsangī, Sar Āsīyāb, and Sar-i-Āsiāb) is a village in Moezziyeh Rural District, Chatrud District, Kerman County, Kerman Province, Iran. At the 2006 census, its population was 1,968, in 546 families.
