= Sar Asiab-e Karreh =

Sar Asiab-e Karreh سراسياب كره
- Village
- Location within Iran
- Coordinates: 30°54′59″N 51°18′58″E
- Country: Iran
- Province: Kohgiluyeh and Boyer-Ahmad
- County: Dana
- Bakhsh: Central
- Rural District: Tut-e Nadeh

Population (2006)
  - Total: 115
- Time zone: UTC+3:30 (IRST)
  - Summer (DST): UTC+4:30 (IRDT)

Sar Asiab-e Karreh (Persian: سراسياب كره, also Romanized as Sar Āsīāb-e Karreh; also known as Sar Āsīāb) is a village in Tut-e Nadeh Rural District, in the Central District of Dana County, Kohgiluyeh and Boyer-Ahmad Province, Iran. At the 2006 census, its population was 115, in 29 families.
