= Jushan, Kurdistan =

Jushan جوشن
- Village
- Location within Iran
- Coordinates: 36°03′22″N 46°14′37″E
- Country: Iran
- Province: Kurdistan
- County: Saqqez
- Bakhsh: Sarshiv
- Rural District: Zu ol Faqr

Population (2006)
  - Total: 349
- Time zone: UTC+3:30 (IRST)
  - Summer (DST): UTC+4:30 (IRDT)

Jushan (Persian: جوشن, also Romanized as Jūshan) is a village in Zu ol Faqr Rural District, Sarshiv District, Saqqez County, Kurdistan Province, Iran. At the 2006 census, its population was 349, in 57 families. The village is populated by Kurds.
