= Sar Asiab, Roshtkhar =

Sar Asiab سراسياب
- Village
- Location within Iran
- Coordinates: 34°59′12″N 59°32′36″E
- Country: Iran
- Province: Razavi Khorasan
- County: Roshtkhar
- Bakhsh: Central
- Rural District: Roshtkhar

Population (2006)
  - Total: 296
- Time zone: UTC+3:30 (IRST)
  - Summer (DST): UTC+4:30 (IRDT)

Sar Asiab (Persian: سراسياب, also Romanized as Sar Āsīāb; also known as Garzābād va Kalāteh) is a village in Roshtkhar Rural District, in the Central District of Roshtkhar County, Razavi Khorasan Province, Iran. At the 2006 census, its population was 296, in 66 families.
