= Sar Asiab-e Pain, Razavi Khorasan =

Sar Asiab-e Pain سراسيابپايين
- Village
- Location within Iran
- Coordinates: 36°30′33″N 59°26′44″E
- Country: Iran
- Province: Razavi Khorasan
- County: Mashhad
- Bakhsh: Central
- Rural District: Tus

Population (2006)
  - Total: 38
- Time zone: UTC+3:30 (IRST)
  - Summer (DST): UTC+4:30 (IRDT)

Sar Asiab-e Pain (Persian: سراسيابپايين, also Romanized as Sar Āsīāb-e Pā’īn) is a village in Tus Rural District, in the Central District of Mashhad County, Razavi Khorasan Province, Iran. At the 2006 census, its population was 38, in 12 families.
