= Sar Asiab, South Khorasan =

Sar Asiab سراسياب
- Village
- Location within Iran
- Coordinates: 33°12′08″N 59°21′21″E
- Country: Iran
- Province: South Khorasan
- County: Birjand
- Bakhsh: Central
- Rural District: Alqurat

Population (2006)
  - Total: 17
- Time zone: UTC+3:30 (IRST)
  - Summer (DST): UTC+4:30 (IRDT)

Sar Asiab (Persian: سراسياب, also Romanized as Sar Āsīāb and Sar Āsyāb) is a village in Alqurat Rural District, in the Central District of Birjand County, South Khorasan Province, Iran. At the 2006 census, its population was 17, in 7 families.
