= Sar Asiab, Sahneh =

Sar Asiab سراسياب
- Village
- Location within Iran
- Coordinates: 34°26′00″N 47°39′37″E
- Country: Iran
- Province: Kermanshah
- County: Sahneh
- Bakhsh: Central
- Rural District: Sahneh

Population (2006)
  - Total: 189
- Time zone: UTC+3:30 (IRST)

Sar Asiab (Persian: سراسياب, also Romanized as Sar Āsīāb and Sarāsīāb) is a village in Sahneh Rural District, in the Central District of Sahneh County, Kermanshah Province, Iran. At the 2006 census, its population was 189, in 37 families.
