= Zamanabad, Saveh =

Zamanabad زمان اباد
- Village
- Location within Iran
- Coordinates: 35°01′03″N 50°04′20″E
- Country: Iran
- Province: Markazi
- County: Saveh
- Bakhsh: Central
- Rural District: Shahsavan Kandi

Population (2006)
  - Total: 17
- Time zone: UTC+3:30 (IRST)
  - Summer (DST): UTC+4:30 (IRDT)

Zamanabad (Persian: زمان اباد, also Romanized as Zamānābād) is a village in Shahsavan Kandi Rural District, in the Central District of Saveh County, Markazi Province, Iran. At the 2006 census, its population was 17, in 9 families.
