= Sar Asiab-e Ajam =

Sar Asiab-e Ajam سراسياب اجم
- Village
- Location within Iran
- Coordinates: 31°15′32″N 50°40′03″E
- Country: Iran
- Province: Kohgiluyeh and Boyer-Ahmad
- County: Kohgiluyeh
- Bakhsh: Dishmok
- Rural District: Ajam

Population (2006)
  - Total: 33
- Time zone: UTC+3:30 (IRST)
  - Summer (DST): UTC+4:30 (IRDT)

Sar Asiab-e Ajam (Persian: سراسياب اجم, also Romanized as Sar Āsīāb-e Ājam; also known as Sar Āsīāb, Sar Asiyab, Sar Āsyāb, and Tang-e Sar Āsīāb) is a village in Ajam Rural District, Dishmok District, Kohgiluyeh County, Kohgiluyeh and Boyer-Ahmad Province, Iran. At the 2006 census, its population was 33, in 6 families.
