= Baghin Rural District =

Rural district in Kerman province, Iran

Baghin Rural District Persian: دهستان باغين
- Rural District
- Location within Iran
- Coordinates: 30°11′04″N 56°34′31″E
- Country: Iran
- Province: Kerman
- County: Kerman
- District: Central
- Capital: Baghin

Population (2016)
  - Total: 4,279
- Time zone: UTC+3:30 (IRST)

Baghin Rural District (Persian: دهستان باغين) is in the Central District of Kerman County, Kerman province, Iran. It is administered from the city of Baghin.

== Demographics ==
=== Population ===
At the time of the 2006 National Census, the rural district's population was 4,867 in 1,173 households. There were 4,652 inhabitants in 1,127 households at the following census of 2011. The 2016 census measured the population of the rural district as 4,279 in 1,127 households. The most populous of its 79 villages was Robat, with 1,597 people.
