= Pish Osta =

Pish Osta پيش استا
- Village
- Location within Iran
- Coordinates: 30°17′12″N 55°24′50″E
- Country: Iran
- Province: Kerman
- County: Shahr-e Babak
- Bakhsh: Central
- Rural District: Pa Qaleh

Population (2006)
  - Total: 113
- Time zone: UTC+3:30 (IRST)
  - Summer (DST): UTC+4:30 (IRDT)

Pish Osta (Persian: پيش استا, also Romanized as Pīsh Ostā; also known as Kūh-e Pīshostā, Pīshāsīāb, Pīsh Asīāb, Pīsh Āsyāb, Pīsh Ostād, Sar Āsīāb, Sar-e Āsīāb, and Sar-i-Āsīāb) is a village in Pa Qaleh Rural District, in the Central District of Shahr-e Babak County, Kerman Province, Iran. At the 2006 census, its population was 113, in 36 families.
