= Zamanabad, West Azerbaijan =

Zamanabad زمان اباد
- Village
- Location within Iran
- Coordinates: 36°51′37″N 46°22′37″E
- Country: Iran
- Province: West Azerbaijan
- County: Shahin Dezh
- Bakhsh: Keshavarz
- Rural District: Keshavarz

Population (2006)
  - Total: 134
- Time zone: UTC+3:30 (IRST)
  - Summer (DST): UTC+4:30 (IRDT)

Zamanabad (Persian: زمان اباد, also Romanized as Zamānābād) is a village in Keshavarz Rural District, Keshavarz District, Shahin Dezh County, West Azerbaijan Province, Iran. At the 2006 census, its population was 134, in 36 families.
