= Sar Asiab, Harsin =

Village in Kermanshah, Iran

Sar Asiab سراسياب
- Village
- Location within Iran
- Coordinates: 34°06′42″N 47°27′51″E
- Country: Iran
- Province: Kermanshah
- County: Harsin
- Bakhsh: Central
- Rural District: Cheshmeh Kabud

Population (2006)
  - Total: 28
- Time zone: UTC+3:30 (IRST)
  - Summer (DST): UTC+4:30 (IRDT)

Sar Asiab (Persian: سراسياب, also Romanized as Sar Āsīāb and Sarāsīāb) is a village in Cheshmeh Kabud Rural District, in the Central District of Harsin County, Kermanshah Province, Iran. At the 2006 census, its population was 28, in 4 families.
