= Zamanabad, Nahavand =

Zamanabad زمان‌آباد
- Village
- Country: Iran
- Province: Hamadan
- County: Nahavand
- Bakhsh: Central
- Rural District: Shaban

Population (2006)
  - Total: 264
- Time zone: UTC+3:30 (IRST)
  - Summer (DST): UTC+4:30 (IRDT)

Zamanabad (Persian: زمان‌آباد, also Romanized as Zamānābād) is a village in Shaban Rural District, in the Central District of Nahavand County, Hamadan Province, Iran. At the 2006 census, its population was 264, in 76 families.
