= Zamanabad, Baft =

Zamanabad زمان اباد
- Village
- Location within Iran
- Coordinates: 29°06′19″N 56°47′06″E
- Country: Iran
- Province: Kerman
- County: Baft
- Bakhsh: Central
- Rural District: Bezenjan

Population (2006)
  - Total: 259
- Time zone: UTC+3:30 (IRST)
  - Summer (DST): UTC+4:30 (IRDT)

Zamanabad (Persian: زمان اباد, also Romanized as Zamānābād) is a village in Bezenjan Rural District, in the Central District of Baft County, Kerman Province, Iran. At the 2006 census, its population was 259, in 66 families.
