= Buj =

Coordinates: 48°06′N 21°39′E

- Interactive map of Buj
- Country: Hungary
- County: Szabolcs-Szatmár-Bereg

Area
  - Total: 32.76 km^{2} (12.65 sq mi)

Population (2015)
  - Total: 2,287
  - Density: 69.8/km^{2} (181/sq mi)
- Time zone: UTC+1 (CET)
  - Summer (DST): UTC+2 (CEST)
- Postal code: 4483
- Area code: 42

Location of Szabolcs-Szatmar-Bereg county in Hungary

Buj is a village in Szabolcs-Szatmár-Bereg county, in the Northern Great Plain region of eastern Hungary.

== Geography ==
It covers an area of 32.76 km^{2} (13 sq mi) and has a population of 2,287 people (2015).
