= Sar Asiab, Dalahu =

Sar Asiab سراسياب
- Village
- Location within Iran
- Coordinates: 34°25′40″N 46°24′41″E
- Country: Iran
- Province: Kermanshah
- County: Dalahu
- Bakhsh: Gahvareh
- Rural District: Gurani

Population (2006)
  - Total: 31
- Time zone: UTC+3:30 (IRST)
  - Summer (DST): UTC+4:30 (IRDT)

Sar Asiab (Persian: سراسياب, also Romanized as Sar Asīyāb, Sar Āsīāb, and Sar Aseyāb) is a village in Gurani Rural District, Gahvareh District, Dalahu County, Kermanshah Province, Iran. At the 2006 census, its population was 31, in 8 families.
