= Keshit Rural District =

Rural district in Kerman province, Iran

Keshit Rural District Persian: دهستان كشيت
- Rural District
- Location within Iran
- Coordinates: 29°47′N 58°05′E
- Country: Iran
- Province: Kerman
- County: Kerman
- District: Golbaf
- Capital: Keshit

Population (2016)
  - Total: 2,312
- Time zone: UTC+3:30 (IRST)

Keshit Rural District (Persian: دهستان كشيت) is in Golbaf District of Kerman County, Kerman province, Iran. Its capital is the village of Keshit.

== Demographics ==
=== Population ===
At the time of the 2006 National Census, the rural district's population was 2,055 in 481 households. There were 2,077 inhabitants in 554 households at the following census of 2011. The 2016 census measured the population of the rural district as 2,312 in 653 households. The most populous of its six villages was Keshit, with 1,249 people.
