= Zangiabad Rural District =

Rural district in Kerman province, Iran

Zangiabad Rural District Persian: دهستان زنگي آباد
- Rural District
- Location within Iran
- Coordinates: 30°24′19″N 57°00′01″E
- Country: Iran
- Province: Kerman
- County: Kerman
- District: Central
- Capital: Zangiabad

Population (2016)
  - Total: 14,371
- Time zone: UTC+3:30 (IRST)

Zangiabad Rural District (Persian: دهستان زنگي آباد) is in the Central District of Kerman County, Kerman province, Iran. It is administered from the city of Zangiabad.

== Demographics ==
=== Population ===
At the time of the 2006 National Census, the rural district's population was 11,438 in 2,660 households. There were 13,372 inhabitants in 3,541 households at the following census of 2011. The 2016 census measured the population of the rural district as 14,371 in 3,982 households. The most populous of its 81 villages was Sharafabad, with 8,570 people.
