= Sar Asiab-e Bala, Razavi Khorasan =

Village in Razavi Khorasan, Iran

Sar Asiab-e Bala سراسياب بالا
- Village
- Location within Iran
- Coordinates: 36°30′38″N 59°28′01″E
- Country: Iran
- Province: Razavi Khorasan
- County: Mashhad
- Bakhsh: Central
- Rural District: Darzab

Population (2006)
  - Total: 45
- Time zone: UTC+3:30 (IRST)
  - Summer (DST): UTC+4:30 (IRDT)

Sar Asiab-e Bala (Persian: سراسياب بالا, also Romanized as Sar Āsīāb-e Bālā) is a village in Darzab Rural District, in the Central District of Mashhad County, Razavi Khorasan Province, Iran. At the 2006 census, its population was 45, in 14 families.
