= Bovaj =

Bovaj بواج
- Village
- Location within Iran
- Coordinates: 33°10′33″N 59°13′07″E
- Country: Iran
- Province: South Khorasan
- County: Birjand
- Bakhsh: Central
- Rural District: Fasharud

Population (2006)
  - Total: 55
- Time zone: UTC+3:30 (IRST)
  - Summer (DST): UTC+4:30 (IRDT)

Bovaj (Persian: بواج, also Romanized as Bovāj and Bauaj; also known as Buj) is a village in Fasharud Rural District, in the Central District of Birjand County, South Khorasan Province, Iran. At the 2006 census, its population was 55, in 18 families.
