= Sar Asiab-e Pain, Fars =

Sar Asiab-e Pain سراسياب پائين
- Village
- Location within Iran
- Coordinates: 30°09′24″N 51°35′07″E
- Country: Iran
- Province: Fars
- County: Mamasani
- Bakhsh: Central
- Rural District: Javid-e Mahuri

Population (2006)
  - Total: 25
- Time zone: UTC+3:30 (IRST)
  - Summer (DST): UTC+4:30 (IRDT)

Sar Asiab-e Pain (Persian: سراسياب پائين, also Romanized as Sar Āsīāb-e Pā’īn; also known as Sar Āsīāb-e Soflá) is a village in Javid-e Mahuri Rural District, in the Central District of Mamasani County, Fars province, Iran. At the 2006 census, its population was 25, in 6 families.
