= Sar Asiab-e Bala, Fars =

Sar Asiab-e Bala سراسياب بالا
- Village
- Location within Iran
- Coordinates: 30°10′56″N 51°36′46″E
- Country: Iran
- Province: Fars
- County: Mamasani
- Bakhsh: Central
- Rural District: Javid-e Mahuri

Population (2006)
  - Total: 502
- Time zone: UTC+3:30 (IRST)
  - Summer (DST): UTC+4:30 (IRDT)

Sar Asiab-e Bala (Persian: سراسياب بالا, also Romanized as Sar Āsīāb-e Bālā; also known as Sar Āsīāb) is a village in Javid-e Mahuri Rural District, in the Central District of Mamasani County, Fars province, Iran. At the 2006 census, its population was 502, in 104 families.
