= Ekhtiarabad =

City in Kerman province, Iran

Ekhtiarabad Persian: اختيارآباد
- City
- Location within Iran
- Coordinates: 30°19′37″N 56°55′13″E
- Country: Iran
- Province: Kerman
- County: Kerman
- District: Central

Population (2016)
  - Total: 9,840
- Time zone: UTC+3:30 (IRST)

Ekhtiarabad (Persian: اختيارآباد) (Note: Also romanized as Ekhteyārābād, Ekhtīārābād, Ekhtīyār Ābād, Ikhtiārābād, and Ikhtrārābād) is a city in the Central District of Kerman County, Kerman province, Iran, serving as the administrative center for Ekhtiarabad Rural District.

== Demographics ==
=== Population ===
At the time of the 2006 National Census, the city's population was 7,513 in 1,827 households. The following census in 2011 counted 8,746 people in 2,363 households. The 2016 census measured the population of the city as 9,840 people in 2,814 households.
