= Ekhtiarabad Rural District =

Rural district in Kerman province, Iran

Ekhtiarabad Rural District Persian: دهستان اختيارآباد
- Rural District
- Location within Iran
- Coordinates: 30°17′50″N 56°54′20″E
- Country: Iran
- Province: Kerman
- County: Kerman
- District: Central
- Capital: Ekhtiarabad

Population (2016)
  - Total: 25,407
- Time zone: UTC+3:30 (IRST)

Ekhtiarabad Rural District (Persian: دهستان اختيارآباد) is in the Central District of Kerman County, Kerman province, Iran. It is administered from the city of Ekhtiarabad.

== Demographics ==
=== Population ===
At the time of the 2006 National Census, the rural district's population was 13,974 in 3,565 households. There were 25,391 inhabitants in 6,962 households at the following census of 2011. The 2016 census measured the population of the rural district as 25,407 in 7,550 households. The most populous of its 151 villages was Rustai-ye Chahardeh Masum, with 9,954 people.
