= Sar Asiab-e Farsangi Rural District =

Rural district in Kerman province, Iran

Sar Asiab-e Farsangi Rural District Persian: دهستان سرآسياب فرسنگي
- Rural District
- Location within Iran
- Coordinates: 30°14′00″N 57°16′33″E
- Country: Iran
- Province: Kerman
- County: Kerman
- District: Central

Population (2016)
  - Total: 1,935
- Time zone: UTC+3:30 (IRST)

Sar Asiab-e Farsangi Rural District (Persian: دهستان سرآسياب فرسنگي) is in the Central District of Kerman County, Kerman province, Iran. Its capital was the village of Sar Asiab-e Farsangi until the village merged with the city of Kerman.

== Demographics ==
=== Population ===
At the time of the 2006 National Census, the rural district's population was 1,631 in 415 households. There were 1,593 inhabitants in 462 households at the following census of 2011. The 2016 census measured the population of the rural district as 1,935 in 605 households. The most populous of its 73 villages was Hoseynabad-e Khan, with 619 people.
