= Jushan Rural District =

Rural district in Kerman province, Iran

Jushan Rural District Persian: دهستان جوشان
- Rural District
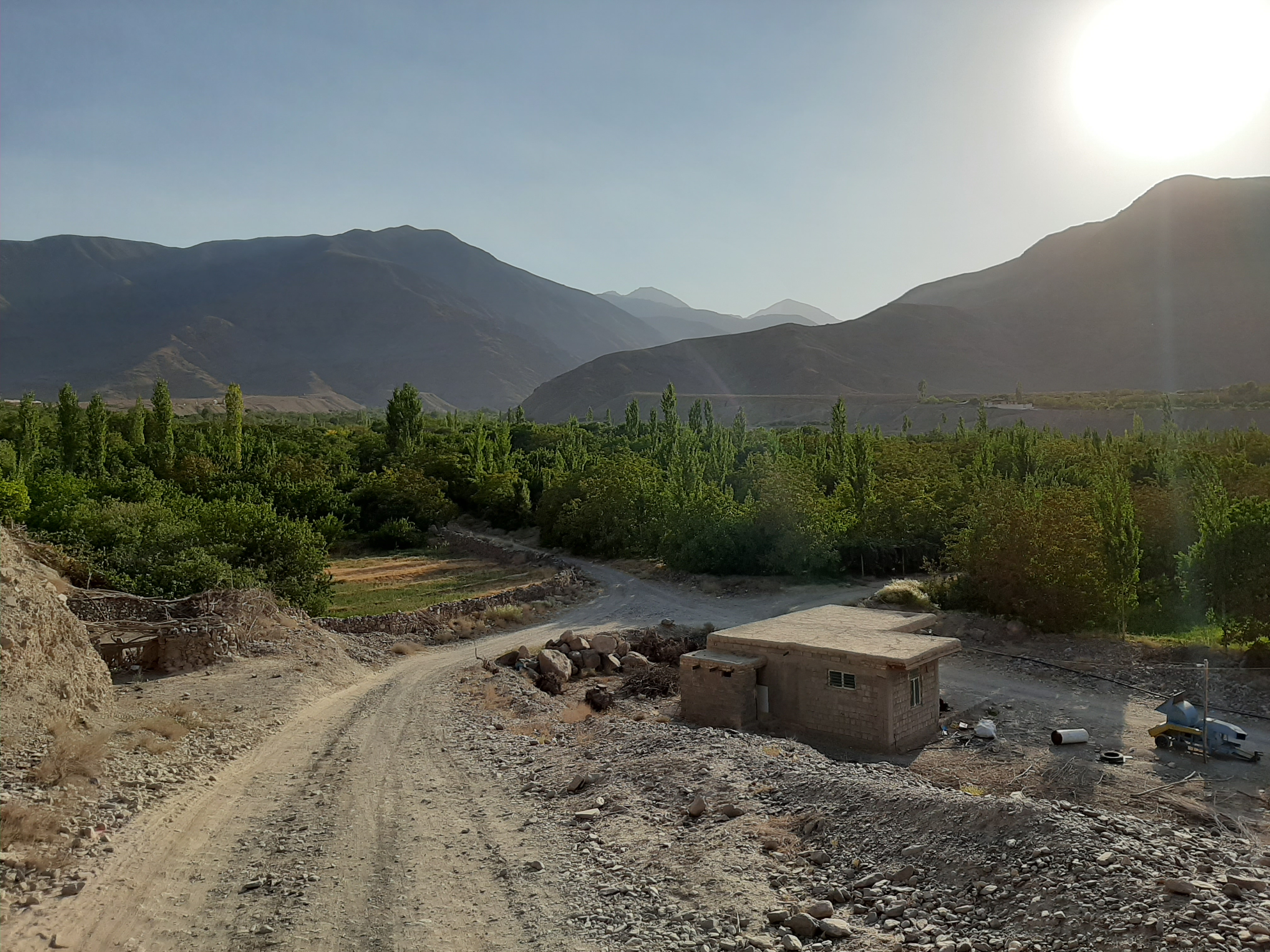
- Jushan

- Location within Iran
- Coordinates: 29°55′20″N 57°43′14″E
- Country: Iran
- Province: Kerman
- County: Kerman
- District: Golbaf
- Capital: Jushan

Population (2016)
  - Total: 2,956
- Time zone: UTC+3:30 (IRST)

Jushan Rural District (Persian: دهستان جوشان) is in Golbaf District of Kerman County, Kerman province, Iran. Its capital is the village of Jushan.

== Demographics ==
=== Population ===
At the time of the 2006 National Census, the rural district's population was 2,583 in 597 households. There were 2,007 inhabitants in 589 households at the following census of 2011. The 2016 census measured the population of the rural district as 2,956 in 917 households. The most populous of its 35 villages was Jushan, with 1,444 people.
