= Golbaf District =

District in Kerman province, Iran

Golbaf District Persian: بخش گلباف
- District
- Location within Iran
- Coordinates: 29°46′16″N 58°09′33″E
- Country: Iran
- Province: Kerman
- County: Kerman
- Capital: Golbaf

Population (2016)
  - Total: 14,473
- Time zone: UTC+3:30 (IRST)

Golbaf District (Persian: بخش گلباف) is in Kerman County, Kerman province, Iran. Its capital is the city of Golbaf.

== Demographics ==
=== Population ===
At the time of the 2006 National Census, the district's population was 12,979 in 3,117 households. The following census in 2011 counted 12,912 people in 3,471 households. The 2016 census measured the population of the district as 14,473 inhabitants in 4,439 households.

=== Administrative divisions ===
Golbaf District Population
Administrative Divisions	2006	2011	2016
Jushan RD	2,583	2,007	2,956
Keshit RD	2,055	2,077	2,312
Golbaf (city)	8,341	8,828	9,205
Total	12,979	12,912	14,473
RD = Rural District
