= Derakhtengan Rural District =

Rural district in Kerman province, Iran

Derakhtengan Rural District Persian: دهستان درختنگان
- Rural District
- Location within Iran
- Coordinates: 30°30′57″N 57°16′36″E
- Country: Iran
- Province: Kerman
- County: Kerman
- District: Central
- Capital: Deh-e Lulu

Population (2016)
  - Total: 12,662
- Time zone: UTC+3:30 (IRST)

Derakhtengan Rural District (Persian: دهستان درختنگان) is in the Central District of Kerman County, Kerman province, Iran. Its capital is the village of Deh-e Lulu.

== Demographics ==
=== Population ===
At the time of the 2006 National Census, the rural district's population was 6,847 in 1,868 households. There were 9,383 inhabitants in 2,802 households at the following census of 2011. The 2016 census measured the population of the rural district as 12,662 in 3,726 households. The most populous of its 108 villages was Saidi, with 8,626 people.
