= Central District (Kerman County) =

District in Kerman province, Iran

Central District (Kerman County) Persian: بخش مرکزی شهرستان کرمان
- District
- Location within Iran
- Coordinates: 30°21′40″N 56°54′08″E
- Country: Iran
- Province: Kerman
- County: Kerman
- Capital: Kerman

Population (2016)
  - Total: 625,187
- Time zone: UTC+3:30 (IRST)

The Central District of Kerman County (Persian: بخش مرکزی شهرستان کرمان) is in Kerman province, Iran. Its capital is the city of Kerman.

== Demographics ==
=== Population ===
At the time of the 2006 National Census, the district's population was 557,236 in 142,815 households. The following census in 2011 counted 612,577 people in 169,168 households. The 2016 census measured the population of the district as 625,187 inhabitants in 188,440 households.

=== Administrative divisions ===
Central District (Kerman County) Population
| Administrative Divisions | 2006 | 2011 | 2016 |
|---|---|---|---|
| Baghin RD | 4,867 | 4,652 | 4,279 |
| Derakhtengan RD | 6,847 | 9,383 | 12,662 |
| Ekhtiarabad RD | 13,974 | 25,391 | 25,407 |
| Sar Asiab-e Farsangi RD | 1,631 | 1,593 | 1,935 |
| Zangiabad RD | 11,438 | 13,372 | 14,371 |
| Baghin (city) | 7,616 | 8,176 | 10,407 |
| Ekhtiarabad (city) | 7,513 | 8,746 | 9,840 |
| Kerman (city) | 496,684 | 534,441 | 537,718 |
| Zangiabad (city) | 6,666 | 6,823 | 8,568 |
| Total | 557,236 | 612,577 | 625,187 |
RD = Rural District
