= Kerman County =

County in Kerman province, Iran

Kerman County Persian: شهرستان کرمان
- County
- Location of Kerman County in Kerman province (top right, yellow)

- Location of Kerman province in Iran
- Coordinates: 30°29′N 57°57′E
- Country: Iran
- Province: Kerman
- Capital: Kerman
- Districts: Central, Chatrud, Golbaf, Mahan, Rayen, Shahdad

Population (2016)
  - Total: 738,724
- Time zone: UTC+3:30 (IRST)

Kerman County (Persian: شهرستان کرمان) is in Kerman province, Iran. Its capital is the city of Kerman. It is the largest county in the province by area.

== Demographics ==
=== Population ===
At the time of the 2006 National Census, the county's population was 654,052 in 166,740 households. The following census in 2011 counted 722,484 people in 199,138 households. The 2016 census measured the population of the county as 738,724 in 222,356 households.

=== Administrative divisions ===
Kerman County's population history and administrative structure over three consecutive censuses are shown in the following table.

Kerman County Population
Administrative Divisions	2006	2011	2016
Central District	557,236	612,577	625,187
Baghin RD	4,867	4,652	4,279
Derakhtengan RD	6,847	9,383	12,662
Ekhtiarabad RD	13,974	25,391	25,407
Sar Asiab-e Farsangi RD	1,631	1,593	1,935
Zangiabad RD	11,438	13,372	14,371
Baghin (city)	7,616	8,176	10,407
Ekhtiarabad (city)	7,513	8,746	9,840
Kerman (city)	496,684	534,441	537,718
Zangiabad (city)	6,666	6,823	8,568
Chatrud District	24,678	26,961	31,183
Kavirat RD	8,737	10,885	13,216
Moezziyeh RD	6,669	7,087	8,047
Chatrud (city)	5,660	5,344	5,860
Kazemabad (city)	3,612	3,645	4,060
Golbaf District	12,979	12,912	14,473
Jushan RD	2,583	2,007	2,956
Keshit RD	2,055	2,077	2,312
Golbaf (city)	8,341	8,828	9,205
Mahan District	29,923	31,319	33,521
Mahan RD	3,364	3,560	4,008
Qanatghestan RD	2,449	2,925	2,553
Jupar (city)	3,830	3,937	3,607
Mahan (city)	16,787	17,178	19,423
Mohiabad (city)	3,493	3,719	3,930
Rayen District	13,903	18,050	15,672
Hoseynabad-e Goruh RD	2,085	3,274	2,588
Rayen RD	2,195	3,770	2,798
Rayen (city)	9,623	11,006	10,286
Shahdad District	15,333	20,665	18,651
Anduhjerd RD	915	1,309	1,313
Siroch RD	2,600	3,549	2,190
Takab RD	4,868	6,276	5,890
Anduhjerd (city)	2,853	3,589	4,041
Shahdad (city)	4,097	5,942	5,217
Total	654,052	722,484	738,724
RD = Rural District

== See also ==
Media related to Kerman County at Wikimedia Commons
