= Hojjatabad =

Hojjatabad or Hojatabad (Persian: حجت‌آباد) may refer to:

== Ardabil Province ==
- Hojjatabad, Ardabil, a village in Germi County

== Fars Province ==
- Hojjatabad, Darab, a village in Darab County
- Hojjatabad, Fars, a village in Mamasani County

== Hormozgan Province ==
- Hojjatabad, Bashagard, a village in Bashagard County
- Hojjatabad, Minab, a village in Minab County
- Hojjatabad, Rudan, a village in Rudan County

== Isfahan Province ==
- Hojjatabad, Chadegan, a village in Chadegan County
- Hojjatabad, Tiran and Karvan, a village in Tiran and Karvan County

== Kerman Province ==
- Hojjatabad, Anar, a village in Anar County
- Hojjatabad, Anbarabad, a village in Anbarabad County
- Hojjatabad, Jebalbarez-e Jonubi, a village in Anbarabad County
- Hojjatabad, Kahnuj, a village in Kahnuj County
- Hojjatabad, Ekhtiarabad, a village in Kerman County
- Hojjatabad, Mahan, a village in Kerman County
- Hojjatabad, Shahdad, a village in Kerman County
- Hojjatabad, Zangiabad, a village in Kerman County
- Hojjatabad, Narmashir, a village in Narmashir County
- Hojjatabad, Ravar, a village in Ravar County
- Hojjatabad, Rigan, a village in Rigan County
- Hojjatabad-e Sardi, a village in Rudbar-e Jonubi County
- Hojjatabad, Sharifabad, a village in Sirjan County

== Kermanshah Province ==
- Hojjatabad, Kermanshah, a village in Sahneh County
- Hojjatabad-e Olya, Kermanshah, a village in Kermanshah County
- Hojjatabad-e Sofla, Kermanshah, a village in Kermanshah County

== Razavi Khorasan Province ==
- Hojjatabad, Fariman, a village in Fariman County
- Hojjatabad, Joghatai, a village in Joghatai County
- Hojjatabad, Khoshab, a village in Khoshab County
- Hojjatabad, Mashhad, a village in Mashhad County

== South Khorasan Province ==
- Hojjatabad, Eresk, a village in Boshruyeh County
- Hojjatabad, Nehbandan, a village in Nehbandan County
- Hojjatabad, Sarayan, a village in Sarayan County
- Hojjatabad, Sarbisheh, a village in Sarbisheh County

== Yazd Province ==
- Hojjatabad-e Sofla, Yazd, a village in Meybod County
- Hojjatabad-e Olya, Yazd, a village in Saduq County
- Hojjatabad, Garizat, a village in Taft County
- Hojjatabad, Nasrabad, a village in Taft County
- Hojjatabad, Yazd, a village in Yazd County
