= Kahnuj (disambiguation) =

Kahnuj is a city in Kerman Province, Iran.

Kahnuj (Persian: كهنوج) may also refer to:

== Hormozgan Province ==
- Kahnuj, Ahmadi, Hormozgan Province
- Kahnuj, Fareghan, Hormozgan Province
- Kahnuj-e Bozorg, Hormozgan Province

== Kerman Province ==
- Kahnuj
- Kahnuj, Baft, Kerman Province
- Kahnuj, Bam, Kerman Province
- Kahnuj, Jiroft, Kerman Province
- Kahnuj, Mahan, Kerman Province
- Kahnuj, Zangiabad, Kerman Province
- Kahnuj-e Moezabad, Kerman Province
- Kahnuj-e Shahrokhi, Kerman Province
- Kahnuj, Rabor, Kerman Province
- Kahnuj, Ravar, Kerman Province
- Kahnuj, Pa Qaleh, Shahr-e Babak County, Kerman Province
- Kahnuj, Hotkan, Zarand County, Kerman Province
- Kahnuj, Sarbanan, Zarand County, Kerman Province
- Kahnuj County, in Kerman Province

== Yazd Province ==
- Kahnuj, Behabad, in Behabad County
- Kahnuj, Asfyj, in Behabad County

== See also ==
- Kannauj, a city in Uttar Pradesh, India
  - Kannauj (Lok Sabha constituency)
  - Kannauj (Assembly constituency)
