= Beheshtabad =

Beheshtabad (Persian: بهشت اباد) may refer to:

- Beheshtabad, Chaharmahal and Bakhtiari
- Beheshtabad, Fars
- Beheshtabad, Gilan
- Beheshtabad, Kerman
- Beheshtabad, Kohgiluyeh and Boyer-Ahmad
- Beheshtabad, Semnan
- Beheshtabad, Bampur, Sistan and Baluchestan Province
- Beheshtabad-e Sharif, Bampur County, Sistan and Baluchestan Province
- Beheshtabad, Dalgan, Sistan and Baluchestan Province
- Beheshtabad, Khash, Sistan and Baluchestan Province
- Beheshtabad, former name of Eslamiyeh, a city in South Khorasan Province
- Beheshtabad, Boshruyeh, South Khorasan Province
- Beheshtabad, Tabas, South Khorasan Province
- Beheshtabad, Yazd
