= Ashrafabad =

Ashrafabad (Persian: اشرف اباد) may refer to:

- Ashrafabad, East Azerbaijan, a village in Bostanabad County, East Azerbaijan Province, Iran
- Ashrafabad, Ilam, a village in Darreh Shahr County, Ilam Province, Iran
- Ashrafabad, Kerman, a village in Anar County, Kerman Province, Iran
- Ashrafabad, Kermanshah, a village in Sahneh County, Kermanshah Province, Iran
- Ashrafabad, Kurdistan, a village in Bijar County, Kurdistan Province, Iran
- Ashrafabad, Azna, a village in Azna County, Lorestan Province, Iran
- Ashrafabad, Delfan, a village in Delfan County, Lorestan Province, Iran
- Ashrafabad, Mazandaran, a village in Amol County, Mazandaran Province, Iran
- Ashrafabad, Tehran, a village in Rey County, Tehran Province, Iran
