= Bonestan =

Bonestan or Banestan or Benestan (Persian: بنستان) may refer to:

- Bonestan, Jebalbarez, Jiroft County, Kerman Province
- Banestan, Boyer-Ahmad, Kohgiluyeh and Boyer-Ahmad Province
- Banestan, Dana, Kohgiluyeh and Boyer-Ahmad Province
- Banestan, Behabad, Yazd Province
- Bonestan, Taft, Yazd Province
- Banestan Rural District, in Yazd Province
