= Torab =

Torab (Persian: تراب) may refer to:

- Torab, Kerman
- Torab, Kermanshah
- Torab, Kohgiluyeh and Boyer-Ahmad
- Torab-e Olya, Kohgiluyeh and Boyer-Ahmad Province
- Torab-e Sofla, Kohgiluyeh and Boyer-Ahmad Province
- Torab-e Vosta, Kohgiluyeh and Boyer-Ahmad Province
