= Kahnow =

Kahnow or Kahnu or Kahnoo or Kahanow (Persian: كهنو) may refer to:

- Kahnow, Fars
- Kahnu, Kerman
- Kahnu, Zangiabad, Kerman Province
- Kahnow, Shahr-e Babak, Kerman Province
- Kahnu, Sistan and Baluchestan
- Kahnow, South Khorasan
