= Estakhruiyeh =

Estakhruiyeh or Estakhruyeh (Persian: استخروئيه) may refer to:

- Estakhruiyeh, Arzuiyeh, Kerman Province
- Estakhruiyeh, Baft, Kerman Province
- Estakhruiyeh, Kerman, Kerman Province
- Estakhruyeh, Yazd
