= Asfij =

Asfij or Esfij or Asfyj (Persian: اسفيج) may refer to:

- Asfich, in South Khorasan
- Asfij, South Khorasan
- Asfyj, Yazd
- Asfyj District, in Yazd Province
- Asfyj Rural District, in Yazd Province
