= Jamshidabad, Kerman =

Jamshidabad جمشيد اباد
- Village
- Location within Iran
- Coordinates: 30°49′15″N 55°21′33″E
- Country: Iran
- Province: Kerman
- County: Anar
- Bakhsh: Central
- Rural District: Hoseynabad

Population (2006)
  - Total: 180
- Time zone: UTC+3:30 (IRST)
  - Summer (DST): UTC+4:30 (IRDT)

Jamshidabad (Persian: جمشيد اباد, also Romanized as Jamshīdābād) is a village in Hoseynabad Rural District, in the Central District of Anar County, Kerman Province, Iran. At the 2006 census, its population was 180, in 50 families.
