= Aliabad-e Hasan =

Village in Kerman province, Iran

Aliabad-e Hasan Persian: علي ابادحسن
- Village
- Location within Iran
- Coordinates: 30°52′17″N 55°19′08″E
- Country: Iran
- Province: Kerman
- County: Anar
- District: Anar
- Rural District: Hoseynabad

Population (2016)
  - Total: 280
- Time zone: UTC+3:30 (IRST)

Aliabad-e Hasan (Persian: علي ابادحسن) (Note: Also romanized as ‘Alīābād-e Ḩasan; also known as ‘Alīābād and ‘Alīābād-e Āqā Ḩasan) is a village in Hoseynabad Rural District of Anar District, Anar County, Kerman province, Iran.

== Demographics ==
=== Population ===
At the time of the 2006 National Census, the village's population was 341 in 78 households, when it was in Rafsanjan County. The following census in 2011 counted 315 people in 85 households, by which time the district had been separated from the county in the establishment of Anar County. The 2016 census measured the population of the village as 280 people in 83 households.
