= Nosratabad, Anar =

Nosratabad نصرت آباد
- Village
- Location within Iran
- Coordinates: 30°47′40″N 55°19′31″E
- Country: Iran
- Province: Kerman
- County: Anar
- Bakhsh: Central
- Rural District: Hoseynabad

Population (2006)
  - Total: 151
- Time zone: UTC+3:30 (IRST)
  - Summer (DST): UTC+4:30 (IRDT)

Nosratabad (Persian: نصرت آباد, also Romanized as Noşratābād) is a village in Hoseynabad Rural District, in the Central District of Anar County, Kerman Province, Iran. At the 2006 census, its population was 151, in 38 families.
