= Deh Rais =

Deh Rais ده رييس
- Village
- Location within Iran
- Coordinates: 30°51′08″N 55°17′19″E
- Country: Iran
- Province: Kerman
- County: Anar
- Bakhsh: Central
- Rural District: Hoseynabad

Population (2006)
  - Total: 1,107
- Time zone: UTC+3:30 (IRST)
  - Summer (DST): UTC+4:30 (IRDT)

Deh Rais (Persian: ده رييس, also Romanized as Deh Ra’īs) is a village in Hoseynabad Rural District, in the Central District of Anar County, Kerman Province, Iran. At the 2006 census, its population was 1,107, in 257 families.
