= Khaleqabad, Anar =

Khaleqabad خالق اباد
- Village
- Location within Iran
- Coordinates: 30°53′20″N 55°18′18″E
- Country: Iran
- Province: Kerman
- County: Anar
- Bakhsh: Central
- Rural District: Hoseynabad

Population (2006)
  - Total: 29
- Time zone: UTC+3:30 (IRST)
  - Summer (DST): UTC+4:30 (IRDT)

Khaleqabad (Persian: خالق اباد, also Romanized as Khāleqābād; also known as Khāliqābād) is a village in Hoseynabad Rural District, in the Central District of Anar County, Kerman Province, Iran. At the 2006 census, its population was 29, in 7 families.
