= Ahmadabad, Behabad =

Village in Yazd province, Iran

Ahmadabad Persian: احمداباد
- Village
- Location within Iran
- Coordinates: 31°57′10″N 55°57′58″E
- Country: Iran
- Province: Yazd
- County: Behabad
- District: Central
- Rural District: Jolgeh

Population (2016)
  - Total: 1,260
- Time zone: UTC+3:30 (IRST)

Ahmadabad (Persian: احمداباد) (Note: Also romanized as Aḩmadābād) is a village in, and the capital of, Jolgeh Rural District of the Central District of Behabad County, Yazd province, Iran.

== Demographics ==
=== Population ===
At the time of the 2006 National Census, the village's population was 1,085 in 249 households, when it was in the former Behabad District of Bafq County. The following census in 2011 counted 1,131 people in 323 households, by which time the district had been separated from the county in the establishment of Behabad County. The rural district was transferred to the new Central District. The 2016 census measured the population of the village as 1,260 people in 390 households. It was the most populous village in its rural district.
