= Golestan, Anar =

Golestan گلستان
- Village
- Location within Iran
- Coordinates: 30°48′03″N 55°20′26″E
- Country: Iran
- Province: Kerman
- County: Anar
- Bakhsh: Central
- Rural District: Hoseynabad

Population (2006)
  - Total: 320
- Time zone: UTC+3:30 (IRST)
  - Summer (DST): UTC+4:30 (IRDT)

Golestan (Persian: گلستان, also Romanized as Golestān) is a village in Hoseynabad Rural District, in the Central District of Anar County, Kerman Province, Iran. As per the 2006 census, its population was 320, with 88 families.
