= Jalaliyeh-ye Hajeri =

Jalaliyeh-ye Hajeri جلاليه هجري
- Village
- Location within Iran
- Coordinates: 30°47′19″N 55°18′49″E
- Country: Iran
- Province: Kerman
- County: Anar
- Bakhsh: Central
- Rural District: Hoseynabad

Population (2006)
  - Total: 77
- Time zone: UTC+3:30 (IRST)
  - Summer (DST): UTC+4:30 (IRDT)

Jalaliyeh-ye Hajeri (Persian: جلاليه هجري, also romanized as Jalālīyeh-ye Hajerī; also known as Jalālīyeh) is a village in Hoseynabad Rural District, in the Central District of Anar County, Kerman Province, Iran. At the 2006 census, its population was 77, in 18 families.
