= Aminabad, Anar =

Aminabad امين اباد
- Village
- Location within Iran
- Coordinates: 30°51′30″N 55°20′51″E
- Country: Iran
- Province: Kerman
- County: Anar
- Bakhsh: Central
- Rural District: Hoseynabad

Population (2006)
  - Total: 39
- Time zone: UTC+3:30 (IRST)
  - Summer (DST): UTC+4:30 (IRDT)

Aminabad (Persian: امين اباد, also Romanized as Amīnābād) is a village in Hoseynabad Rural District, in the Central District of Anar County, Kerman Province, Iran. At the 2006 census, its population was 39, in 8 families.
