= Deh Ali-ye Asfyj =

Deh Ali-ye Asfyj ده علي اسفيج
- Village
- Location within Iran
- Coordinates: 31°40′49″N 56°12′08″E
- Country: Iran
- Province: Yazd
- County: Behabad
- Bakhsh: Asfyj
- Rural District: Asfyj

Population (2006)
  - Total: 98
- Time zone: UTC+3:30 (IRST)
  - Summer (DST): UTC+4:30 (IRDT)

Deh Ali-ye Asfyj (Persian: ده علي اسفيج, also Romanized as Deh ‘Alī-ye Āsfyj; also known as Deh ‘Alī and Deh-e ‘Alī) is a village in Asfyj Rural District, Asfyj District, Behabad County, Yazd Province, Iran. At the 2006 census, its population was 98, in 23 families.
