= Asadabad, Anar =

Asadabad اسداباد
- Village
- Location within Iran
- Coordinates: 30°51′51″N 55°19′39″E
- Country: Iran
- Province: Kerman
- County: Anar
- Bakhsh: Central
- Rural District: Hoseynabad

Population (2006)
  - Total: 190
- Time zone: UTC+3:30 (IRST)
  - Summer (DST): UTC+4:30 (IRDT)

Asadabad (Persian: اسداباد, also Romanized as Asadābād; also known as Asadābād-e Mahdavī) is a village in Hoseynabad Rural District, in the Central District of Anar County, Kerman Province, Iran. At the 2006 census, its population was 190, in 40 families.
