= Deh Askar =

Deh Askar ده عسكر
- Village
- Location within Iran
- Coordinates: 31°44′11″N 56°11′58″E
- Country: Iran
- Province: Yazd
- County: Behabad
- Bakhsh: Asfyj
- Rural District: Asfyj

Population (2006)
  - Total: 18
- Time zone: UTC+3:30 (IRST)
  - Summer (DST): UTC+4:30 (IRDT)

Deh Askar (Persian: ده عسكر, also Romanized as Deh ‘Askar; also known as Deh-e ‘Asgar) is a village in Asfyj Rural District, Asfyj District, Behabad County, Yazd Province, Iran. At the 2006 census, its population was 18, in 7 families.
