= Hoseynabad-e Deh Askar =

Hoseynabad-e Deh Askar حسين ابادده عسكر
- Village
- Location within Iran
- Coordinates: 31°43′45″N 56°12′02″E
- Country: Iran
- Province: Yazd
- County: Behabad
- Bakhsh: Asfyj
- Rural District: Asfyj

Population (2006)
  - Total: 169
- Time zone: UTC+3:30 (IRST)
  - Summer (DST): UTC+4:30 (IRDT)

Hoseynabad-e Deh Askar (Persian: حسين ابادده عسكر, also Romanized as Ḩoseynābād-e Deh ‘Askar; also known as Ḩoseynābād) is a village in Asfyj Rural District, Asfyj District, Behabad County, Yazd Province, Iran. At the 2006 census, its population was 169, in 42 families.
