= Ahmadabad-e Atayi =

Ahmadabad-e Atayi احمدابادعطائي
- Village
- Location within Iran
- Coordinates: 30°45′58″N 55°19′05″E
- Country: Iran
- Province: Kerman
- County: Anar
- Bakhsh: Central
- Rural District: Hoseynabad

Population (2006)
  - Total: 33
- Time zone: UTC+3:30 (IRST)
  - Summer (DST): UTC+4:30 (IRDT)

Ahmadabad-e Atayi (Persian: احمدابادعطائي, also Romanized as Aḩmadābād-e ʿAṭāyī; also known as Aḩmadābād) is a village in Hoseynabad Rural District, in the Central District of Anar County, Kerman Province, Iran. At the 2006 census, its population was 33, in 9 families.
