= Ferdowsiyeh, Yazd =

Ferdowsiyeh فردوسيه
- Village
- Location within Iran
- Coordinates: 31°38′40″N 56°19′58″E
- Country: Iran
- Province: Yazd
- County: Behabad
- Bakhsh: Asfyj
- Rural District: Asfyj

Population (2006)
  - Total: 20
- Time zone: UTC+3:30 (IRST)
  - Summer (DST): UTC+4:30 (IRDT)

Ferdowsiyeh (Persian: فردوسيه, also Romanized as Ferdowsīyeh) is a village in Asfyj Rural District, Asfyj District, Behabad County, Yazd Province, Iran. At the 2006 census, its population was 20, in 4 families.
