= Ashrafabad, Kerman =

Ashrafabad اشرف اباد
- Village
- Location within Iran
- Coordinates: 30°47′07″N 55°23′27″E
- Country: Iran
- Province: Kerman
- County: Anar
- Bakhsh: Central
- Rural District: Bayaz

Population (2006)
  - Total: 26
- Time zone: UTC+3:30 (IRST)

Ashrafabad (Persian: اشرف اباد, also romanized as Ashrafābād) is a village in Bayaz Rural District, in the Central District of Anar County, Kerman Province, Iran. At the 2006 census, its population was 26, in 4 families.
