= Arij =

Arij اريج
- Village
- Location within Iran
- Coordinates: 31°43′55″N 56°12′01″E
- Country: Iran
- Province: Yazd
- County: Behabad
- Bakhsh: Asfyj
- Rural District: Asfyj

Population (2006)
  - Total: 97
- Time zone: UTC+3:30 (IRST)
  - Summer (DST): UTC+4:30 (IRDT)

Arij (Persian: اريج, also Romanized as Ārīj) is a village in Asfyj Rural District, Asfyj District, Behabad County, Yazd Province, Iran. At the 2006 census, its population was 97, in 29 families.
