= Kahnuj, Asfyj =

Kahnuj كهنوج
- Village
- Location within Iran
- Coordinates: 31°39′55″N 56°06′04″E
- Country: Iran
- Province: Yazd
- County: Behabad
- Bakhsh: Asfyj
- Rural District: Asfyj

Population (2006)
  - Total: 125
- Time zone: UTC+3:30 (IRST)
  - Summer (DST): UTC+4:30 (IRDT)

Kahnuj (Persian: كهنوج, also Romanized as Kahnūj; also known as Kenuj and Patakīgān) is a village in Asfyj Rural District, Asfyj District, Behabad County, Yazd Province, Iran. At the 2006 census, its population was 125, in 34 families.
