= Deh Heydar, Kerman =

Deh Heydar ده حيدر
- Village
- Country: Iran
- Province: Kerman
- County: Anar
- Bakhsh: Central
- Rural District: Hoseynabad

Population (2006)
  - Total: 44
- Time zone: UTC+3:30 (IRST)
  - Summer (DST): UTC+4:30 (IRDT)

Deh Heydar (Persian: ده حيدر, also Romanized as Deh Ḩeydar) is a village in Hoseynabad Rural District, in the Central District of Anar County, Kerman Province, Iran. At the 2006 census, its population was 44, in 8 families.
