= Buiabad =

Buiabad بوئي اباد
- Village
- Location within Iran
- Coordinates: 31°51′53″N 55°49′13″E
- Country: Iran
- Province: Yazd
- County: Behabad
- Bakhsh: Central
- Rural District: Jolgeh

Population (2006)
  - Total: 54
- Time zone: UTC+3:30 (IRST)
  - Summer (DST): UTC+4:30 (IRDT)

Buiabad (Persian: بوئي اباد, also Romanized as Bū’īābād; also known as Būnīābād) is a village in Jolgeh Rural District, in the Central District of Behabad County, Yazd Province, Iran. At the 2006 census, its population was 54, in 12 families.
