= Deh-e Heydar =

Deh-e Heydar or Deh Heydar or Deh Heidar (Persian: ده حيدر) may refer to:

- Deh-e Heydar, Hamadan
- Deh Heydar, Isfahan
- Deh Heydar, Kerman
