= Golshan, Anar =

Village in Kerman province, Iran

Golshan Persian: گلشن
- Village
- Location within Iran
- Coordinates: 30°46′44″N 55°19′32″E
- Country: Iran
- Province: Kerman
- County: Anar
- District: Anar
- Rural District: Hoseynabad

Population (2016)
  - Total: 2,744
- Time zone: UTC+3:30 (IRST)

Golshan (Persian: گلشن) is a village in Hoseynabad Rural District of Anar District, Anar County, Kerman province, Iran.

== Demographics ==
=== Population ===
At the time of the 2006 National Census, the village's population was 2,240 in 542 households, when it was in Rafsanjan County. The following census in 2011 counted 2,425 people in 667 households, by which time the district had been separated from the county in the establishment of Anar County. The 2016 census measured the population of the village as 2,744 people in 782 households. It was the most populous village in its rural district.
