= Hojjatabad, Anar =

Hojjatabad حجت‌آباد
- Village
- Location within Iran
- Coordinates: 30°40′30″N 55°32′40″E
- Country: Iran
- Province: Kerman
- County: Anar
- Bakhsh: Central
- Rural District: Bayaz

Population (2006)
  - Total: 723
- Time zone: UTC+3:30 (IRST)
  - Summer (DST): UTC+4:30 (IRDT)

Hojjatabad (Persian: حجت‌آباد, also Romanized as Ḩojjatābād) is a village in Bayaz Rural District, in the Central District of Anar County, Kerman Province, Iran. At the 2006 census, its population was 723, in 177 families.
