= Behdan, Yazd =

Behdan بهدان
- Village
- Location within Iran
- Coordinates: 31°45′16″N 56°00′07″E
- Country: Iran
- Province: Yazd
- County: Behabad
- Bakhsh: Central
- Rural District: Banestan

Population (2006)
  - Total: 45
- Time zone: UTC+3:30 (IRST)
  - Summer (DST): UTC+4:30 (IRDT)

Behdan (Persian: بهدان, also Romanized as Behdān) is a village in Banestan Rural District, in the Central District of Behabad County, Yazd Province, Iran. At the 2006 census, its population was 45, in 12 families.
