= Lotfabad, Anar =

Village in Kerman province, Iran

Lotfabad Persian: لطفاباد
- Village
- Location within Iran
- Coordinates: 30°39′36″N 55°32′29″E
- Country: Iran
- Province: Kerman
- County: Anar
- District: Anar
- Rural District: Bayaz

Population (2016)
  - Total: 1,914
- Time zone: UTC+3:30 (IRST)

Lotfabad (Persian: لطفاباد) (Note: Also romanized as Loṭfābād) is a village in, and the capital of, Bayaz Rural District of Anar District, Anar County, Kerman province, Iran.

== Demographics ==
=== Population ===
At the time of the 2006 National Census, the village's population was 1,717 in 442 households, when it was in Rafsanjan County. The following census in 2011 counted 1,879 people in 510 households, by which time the district had been separated from the county in the establishment of Anar County. The 2016 census measured the population of the village as 1,914 people in 575 households.
