= Torab, Kerman =

Torab تراب
- Village
- Location within Iran
- Coordinates: 30°53′28″N 55°16′45″E
- Country: Iran
- Province: Kerman
- County: Anar
- Bakhsh: Central
- Rural District: Hoseynabad

Population (2006)
  - Total: 382
- Time zone: UTC+3:30 (IRST)
  - Summer (DST): UTC+4:30 (IRDT)

Torab (Persian: تراب, also Romanized as Torāb; also known as Torābābād) is a village in Hoseynabad Rural District, in the Central District of Anar County, Kerman Province, Iran. At the 2006 census, its population was 382, in 99 families.
