= Qorbanabad =

Qorbanabad (Persian: قربان اباد) may refer to:

- Qorbanabad, Fars
- Qorbanabad, Golestan
- Qorbanabad, Minudasht, Golestan Province
- Qorbanabad, Kerman
- Qorbanabad, Dargaz, Razavi Khorasan Province
