= Estakhruyeh, Yazd =

Estakhruyeh استخروييه
- Village
- Location within Iran
- Coordinates: 31°45′42″N 55°58′50″E
- Country: Iran
- Province: Yazd
- County: Behabad
- Bakhsh: Central
- Rural District: Banestan

Population (2006)
  - Total: 19
- Time zone: UTC+3:30 (IRST)
  - Summer (DST): UTC+4:30 (IRDT)

Estakhruyeh (Persian: استخروييه, also Romanized as Estakhrūyeh; also known as Eşţabl Qū, Estalkhū, and Eşţal Qū) is a village in Banestan Rural District, in the Central District of Behabad County, Yazd Province, Iran. At the 2006 census, its population was 19, in 9 families.
