= Beheshtabad, Yazd =

Beheshtabad بهشت اباد
- Village
- Location within Iran
- Coordinates: 31°39′56″N 56°05′45″E
- Country: Iran
- Province: Yazd
- County: Behabad
- Bakhsh: Central
- Rural District: Banestan

Population (2006)
  - Total: 21
- Time zone: UTC+3:30 (IRST)
  - Summer (DST): UTC+4:30 (IRDT)

Beheshtabad (Persian: بهشت اباد, also Romanized as Beheshtābād) is a village in Banestan Rural District, in the Central District of Behabad County, Yazd Province, Iran. At the 2006 census, its population was 21, in 6 families.
