= Shamabad, Kerman =

Shahm Abad شاهم اباد
- Village
- Location within Iran
- Coordinates: 30°41′03″N 55°31′00″E
- Country: Iran
- Province: Kerman
- County: Anar
- Bakhsh: Central
- Rural District: Bayaz

Population (2006)
  - Total: 954
- Time zone: UTC+3:30 (IRST)
  - Summer (DST): UTC+4:30 (IRDT)

Shahmabad (Persian: شاهم اباد, also Romanized as Shāmābād; also known as Shāhamābād, Shāhemābād, and Emāmīyeh) is a village in Bayaz Rural District, in the Central District of Anar County, Kerman Province, Iran. At the 2006 census, its population was 954, in 238 families.
