= Behdan =

Behdan (Persian: بهدان) may refer to:

- Behdan, Gilan
- Behdan, South Khorasan
- Behdan, Yazd
