= Didarak =

Didarak (Persian: ديدرك) may refer to:

- Didarak, Kerman
- Didarak, Yazd
