= Fazlabad-e Sofla =

Fazlabad-e Sofla فضل ابادسفلي
- Village
- Location within Iran
- Coordinates: 31°51′42″N 55°55′45″E
- Country: Iran
- Province: Yazd
- County: Behabad
- Bakhsh: Central
- Rural District: Jolgeh

Population (2006)
  - Total: 69
- Time zone: UTC+3:30 (IRST)
  - Summer (DST): UTC+4:30 (IRDT)

Fazlabad-e Sofla (Persian: فضل ابادسفلي, also Romanized as Faẕlābād-e Soflá; also known as Fallāḩābād-e Pā’īn and Fallāḩābād Pā’īn) is a village in Jolgeh Rural District, in the Central District of Behabad County, Yazd Province, Iran. At the 2006 census, its population was 69, in 24 families.
