= Hojjatabad-e Olya =

Hojjatabad-e Olya (Persian: حجت ابادعليا) may refer to:

- Hojjatabad-e Olya, Kermanshah
- Hojjatabad-e Olya, Yazd
