= Asfyj, Yazd =

Village in Yazd province, Iran

Asfyj Persian: اسفيج
- Village
- Location within Iran
- Coordinates: 31°40′18″N 56°12′53″E
- Country: Iran
- Province: Yazd
- County: Behabad
- District: Asfyj
- Rural District: Asfyj

Population (2016)
  - Total: 619
- Time zone: UTC+3:30 (IRST)

Asfyj (Persian: اسفيج) (Note: Also romanized as Asfij, Āsfīj, Āsfyj, and Esfīj; also known as Āsfīch, Aspish, and Esfīch) is a village in Asfyj Rural District of Asfyj District, Behabad County, Yazd province, Iran, serving as capital of both the district and the rural district.

== Demographics ==
=== Population ===
At the time of the 2006 National Census, the village's population was 654 in 154 households, when it was in the former Behabad District of Bafq County. The following census in 2011 counted 739 people in 197 households, by which time the district had been separated from the county in the establishment of Behabad County. The rural district was transferred to the new Asfyj District. The 2016 census measured the population of the village as 619 people in 203 households. It was the most populous village in its rural district.
