= Banestan, Behabad =

Village in Yazd province, Iran

Banestan Persian: بنستان
- Village
- Location within Iran
- Coordinates: 31°43′43″N 56°04′02″E
- Country: Iran
- Province: Yazd
- County: Behabad
- District: Asfyj
- Rural District: Banestan

Population (2016)
  - Total: 706
- Time zone: UTC+3:30 (IRST)

Banestan (Persian: بنستان) (Note: Also romanized as Banestān) is a village in, and the capital of, Banestan Rural District of Asfyj District of Behabad County, Yazd province, Iran.

== Demographics ==
=== Population ===
At the time of the 2006 National Census, the village's population was 318 in 90 households, when it was in the former Behabad District of Bafq County. The following census in 2011 counted 736 people in 252 households, by which time the district had been separated from the county in the establishment of Behabad County. The rural district was transferred to the new Asfyj District. The 2016 census measured the population of the village as 706 people in 231 households. It was the most populous village in its rural district.
