= Tarb =

Tarb may refer to:

- Tarb, Iran, a village in Kohgiluyeh and Boyer-Ahmad Province, Iran
- A character in Tokyo Mew Mew; see List of Tokyo Mew Mew characters
