= ARIJ =

ARIJ can refer to:

- Applied Research Institute–Jerusalem, a Palestinian NGO
- Arab Reporters for Investigative Journalism, a Jordan-based journalism organisation
- Arij, a village in Iran
