= Fallahabad =

Fallahabad (Persian: فلاح اباد) may refer to:

- Fallahabad, Gilan
- Fallahabad, Razavi Khorasan
- Fallahabad-e Pain, Yazd Province
