= Bayaz =

Village in Kerman province, Iran

Bayaz Persian: بياض
- Village
- Location within Iran
- Coordinates: 30°42′09″N 55°26′38″E
- Country: Iran
- Province: Kerman
- County: Anar
- District: Anar
- Rural District: Bayaz

Population (2016)
  - Total: 3,869
- Time zone: UTC+3:30 (IRST)

Bayaz (Persian: بياض) (Note: Also romanized as Bayāẕ and Beyāẕ) is a village in Bayaz Rural District of Anar District, Anar County, Kerman province, Iran.

== Demographics ==
=== Population ===
At the time of the 2006 National Census, the village's population was 3,403 in 802 households, when it was in Rafsanjan County. The following census in 2011 counted 4,489 people in 1,145 households, by which time the district had been separated from the county in the establishment of Anar County. The 2016 census measured the population of the village as 3,869 people in 1,090 households. It was the most populous village in its rural district.
