= Beyaz =

Beyaz may refer to:

== People ==
- Beyazıt Öztürk (born 1969), also known as Beyaz, Turkish entertainer, the host of the epynumous show
- Eren Beyaz (born 1985), Turkish basketball player
- Fatma Beyaz, Turkish volleyball player
- Ömer Faruk Beyaz, Turkish footballer

== Other ==
- Beyaz, Iran, a village in Kerman Province, Iran
- Beyaz Show, Turkish talk show
- Beyaz (drug), an oral contraceptive

== See also ==
- Bayaz
