= Boniabad =

Boniabad or Boneyabad or Beneyabad or Bonyabad or Buniabad or Baniabad (Persian: بنياباد) may refer to various places in Iran:

- Bonyabad, Ardabil
- Boneyabad, Khvaf, Razavi Khorasan Province
- Boniabad, South Khorasan
- Boniabad, Darmian, South Khorasan Province
- Bonyabad, Zirkuh, South Khorasan Province
- Buniabad, Yazd
