= Shamabad =

Shamabad (Persian: شم اباد) may refer to:

- Shamabad, Kerman
- Shamabad, Razavi Khorasan
