= Aminshahr =

City in Kerman province, Iran

Aminshahr Persian: امین‌شهر
- City
- Location within Iran
- Coordinates: 30°50′29″N 55°20′27″E
- Country: Iran
- Province: Kerman
- County: Anar
- District: Anar

Population (2016)
  - Total: 4,413
- Time zone: UTC+3:30 (IRST)

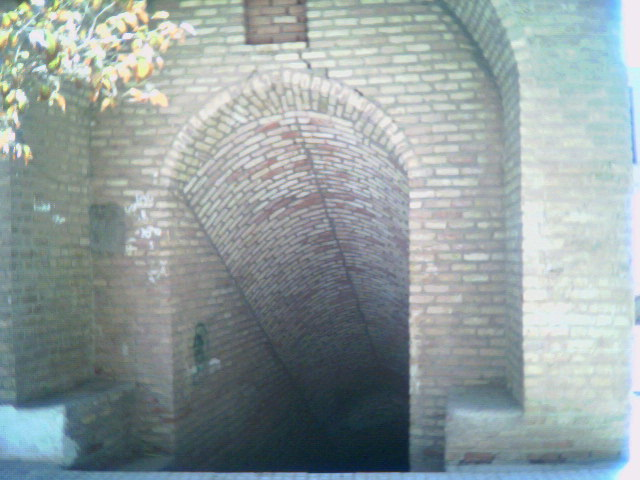
Entrance to the historic Aminshahr water reservoir

Aminshahr (Persian: امین‌شهر) (Note: Formerly Hoseynabad (حسين آباد), also romanized as Ḩoseynābād; also known as Ḩoseynābād Amīn and Husainābād) is a city in Anar District of Anar County, Kerman province, Iran, serving as the administrative center for Hoseynabad Rural District.

== Demographics ==
=== Population ===
At the time of the 2006 National Census, the city's population was 4,044 in 989 households, when it was in Rafsanjan County. The following census in 2011 counted 4,555 people in 1,220 households, by which time the district had been separated from the county in the establishment of Anar County The 2016 census measured the population of the city as 4,413 people in 1,288 households.
