= Anar, Iran =

City in Kerman province, Iran

Anar Persian: انار
- City
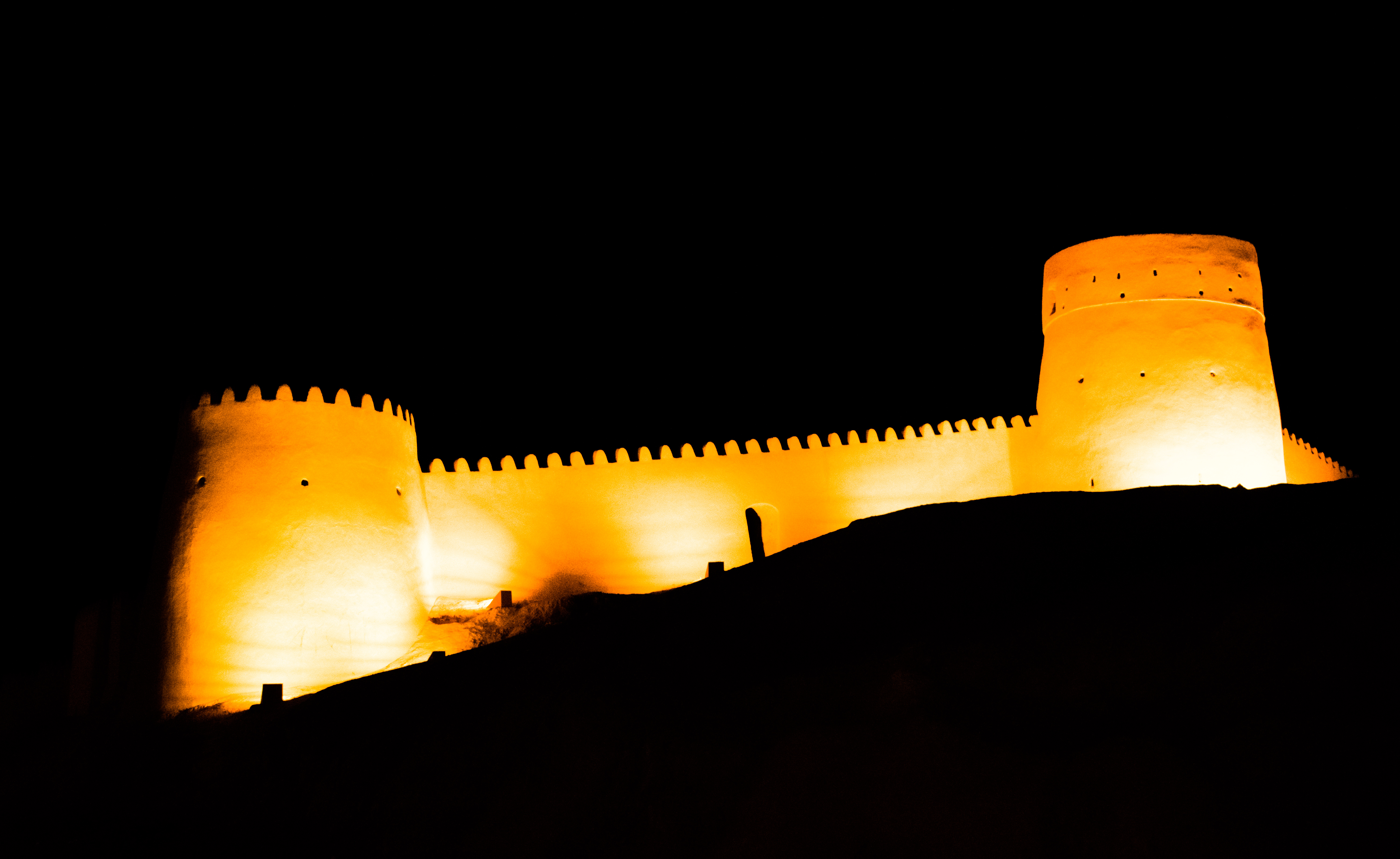
- Arg-e Anar

- Location within Iran
- Coordinates: 30°51′56″N 55°16′13″E
- Country: Iran
- Province: Kerman
- County: Anar
- District: Anar

Population (2016)
  - Total: 15,532
- Time zone: UTC+3:30 (IRST)

Anar (Persian: انار) (Note: Also romanized as Anār; anar means pomegranate) is a city in Anar District of Anar County, Kerman province, Iran, serving as capital of both the county and the district. The city contains a Sasanian era castle named Anar Castle.

== Demographics ==
=== Population ===
At the time of the 2006 National Census, the city's population was 12,791 in 3,227 households, when it was in Rafsanjan County. The following census in 2011 counted 13,089 people in 3,660 households, by which time the district had been separated from the county in the establishment of Anar County. The 2016 census measured the population of the city as 15,532 people in 4,660 households.
