= Anar Castle =

Iranian national heritage site

Coordinates: 30.8719°N 55.2704°E

- ارگ انار
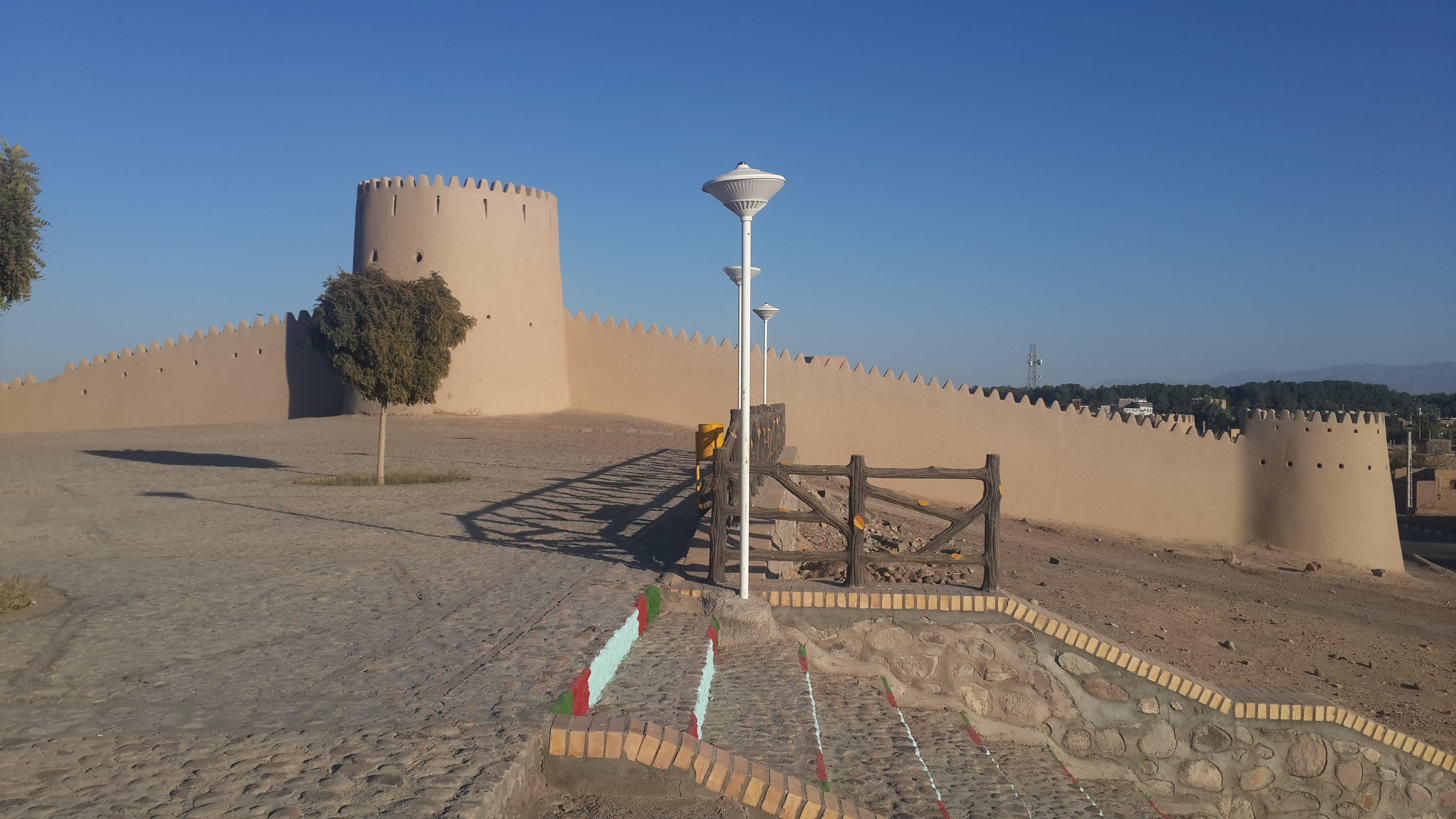
- Interactive map of the Anar Castle area

General information
- Location: Anar, Iran

Anar Castle (Persian: ارگ انار) is a Sasanian castle in Anar, Kerman province, Iran. It is 11,179 square meters large and has 8 towers.

== History ==
The castle was built during the Sasanian era and was later repaired during the Safavid era and used again.

The castle's interior used to contain buildings that sometimes had 3 floors, but these were all demolished in 1981–82 since they were used as shelter by drug addicts.

It was listed among the national heritage sites of Iran with the number 30343 on 6 February 2011.

== Gallery ==
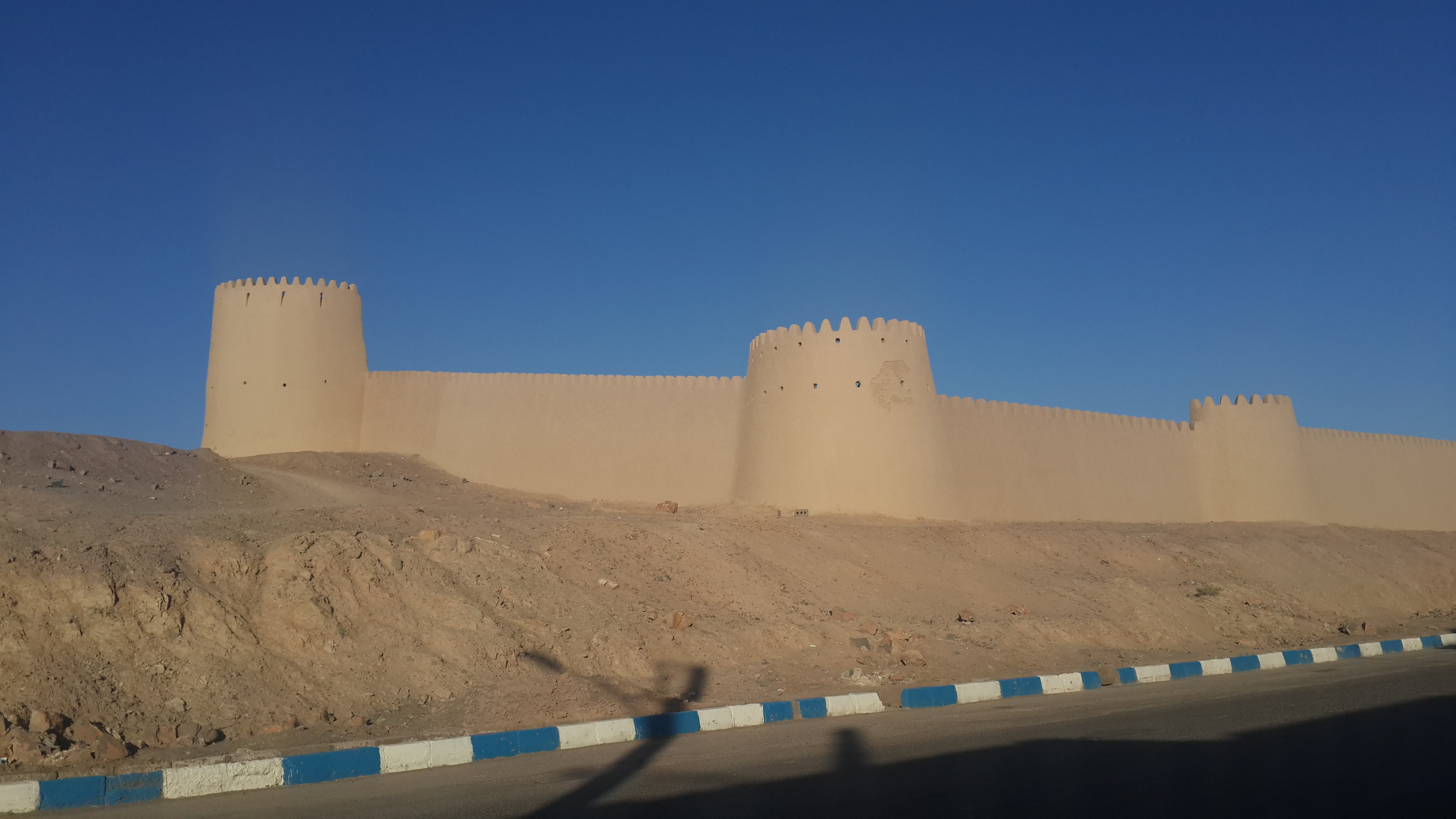

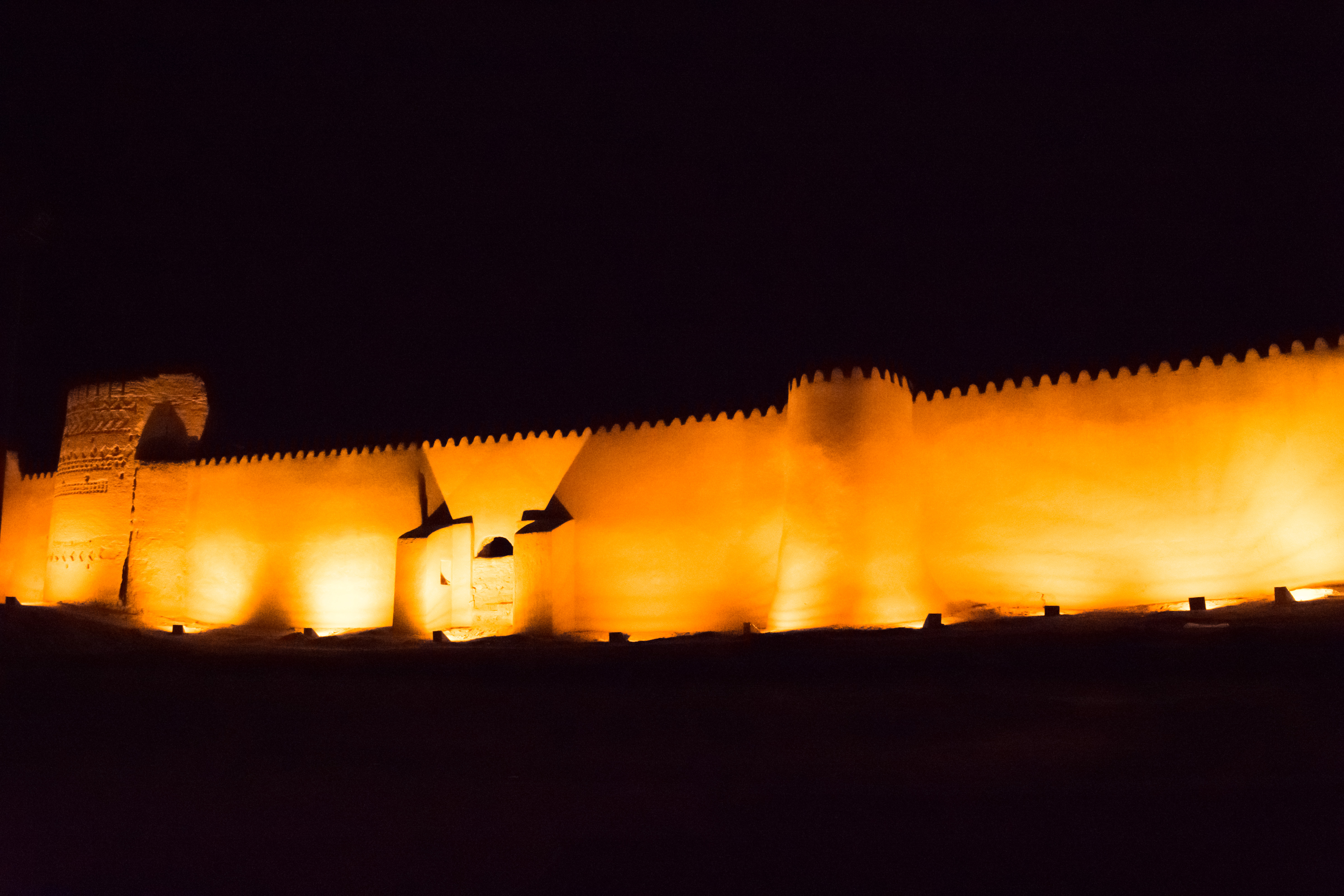

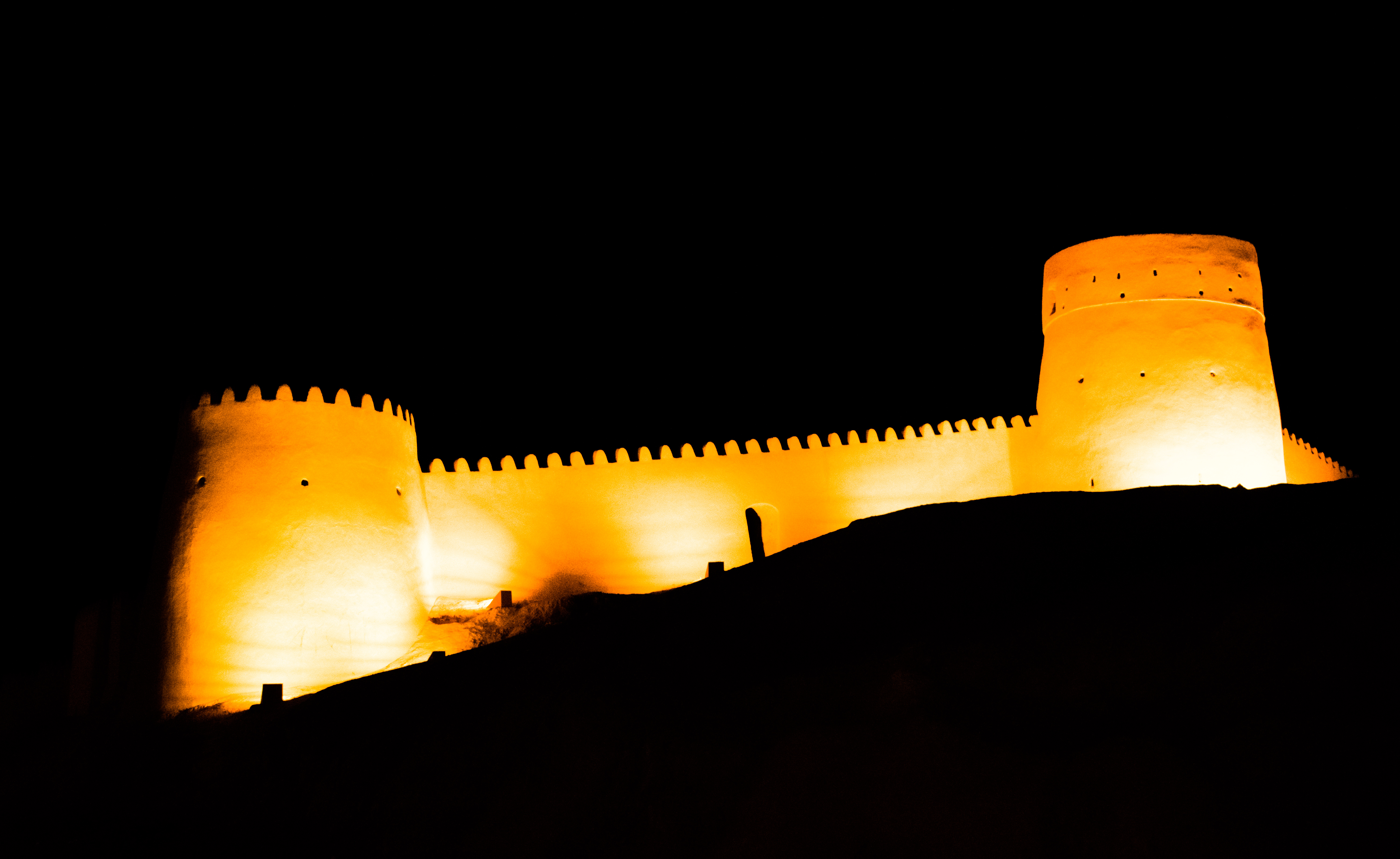

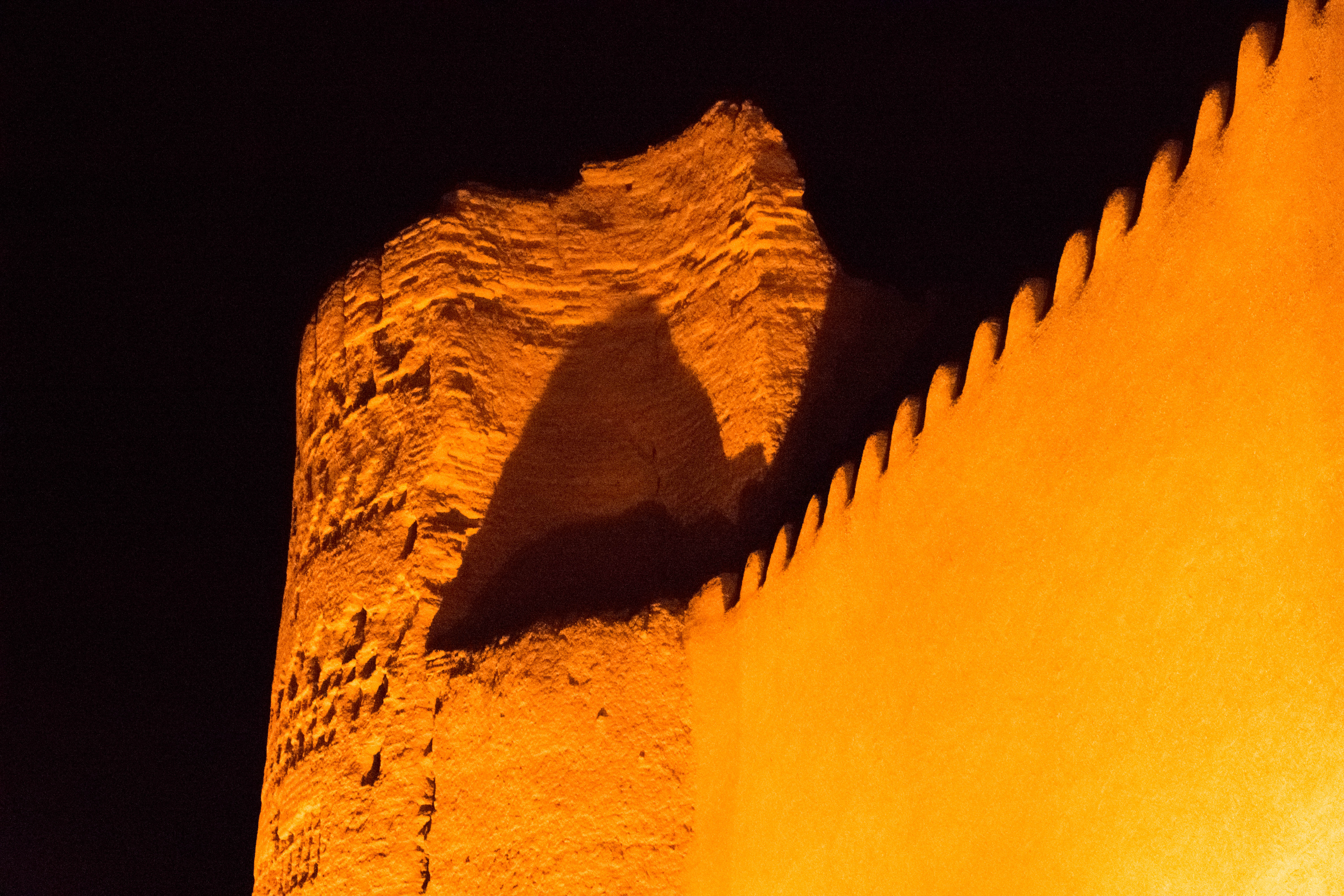

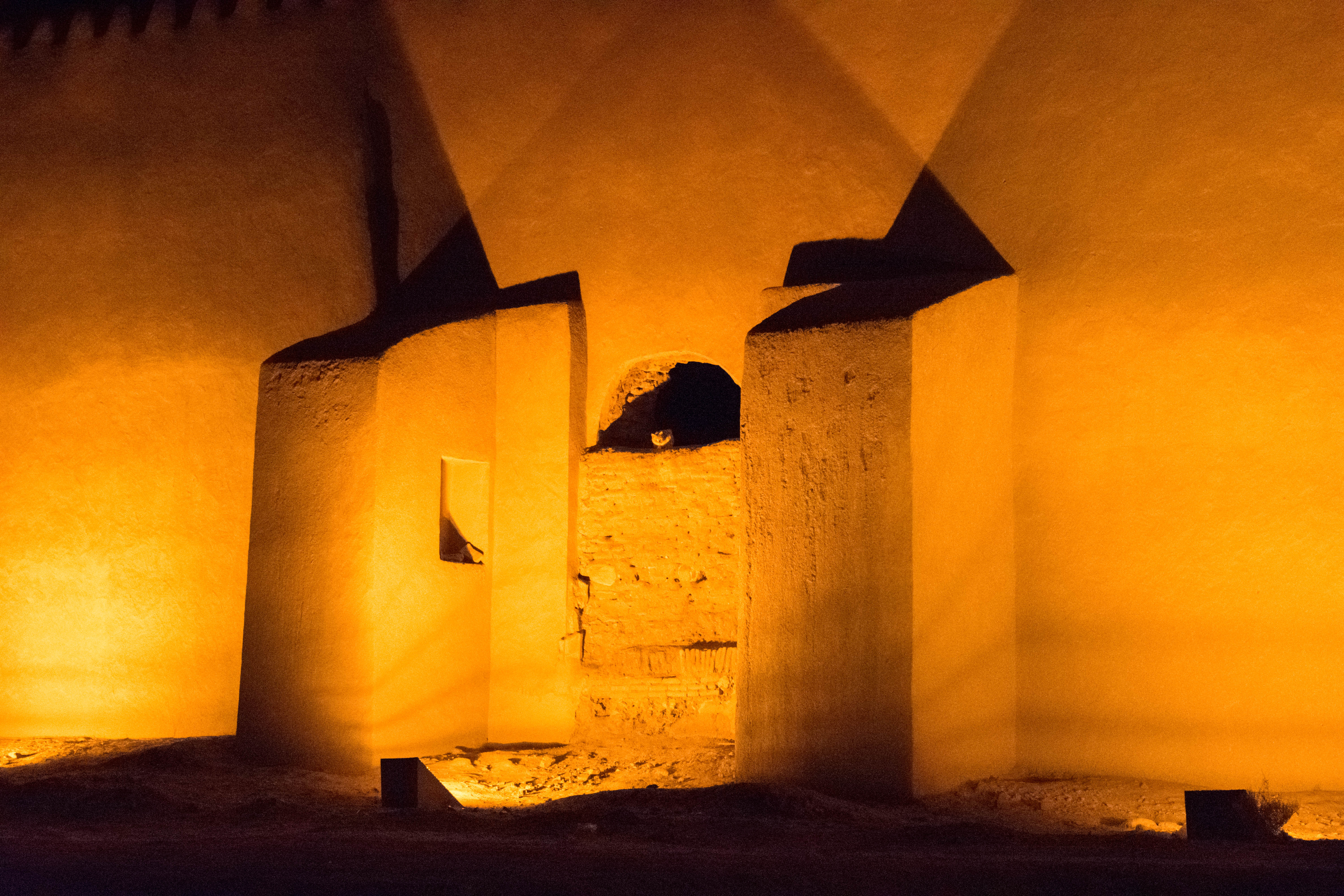

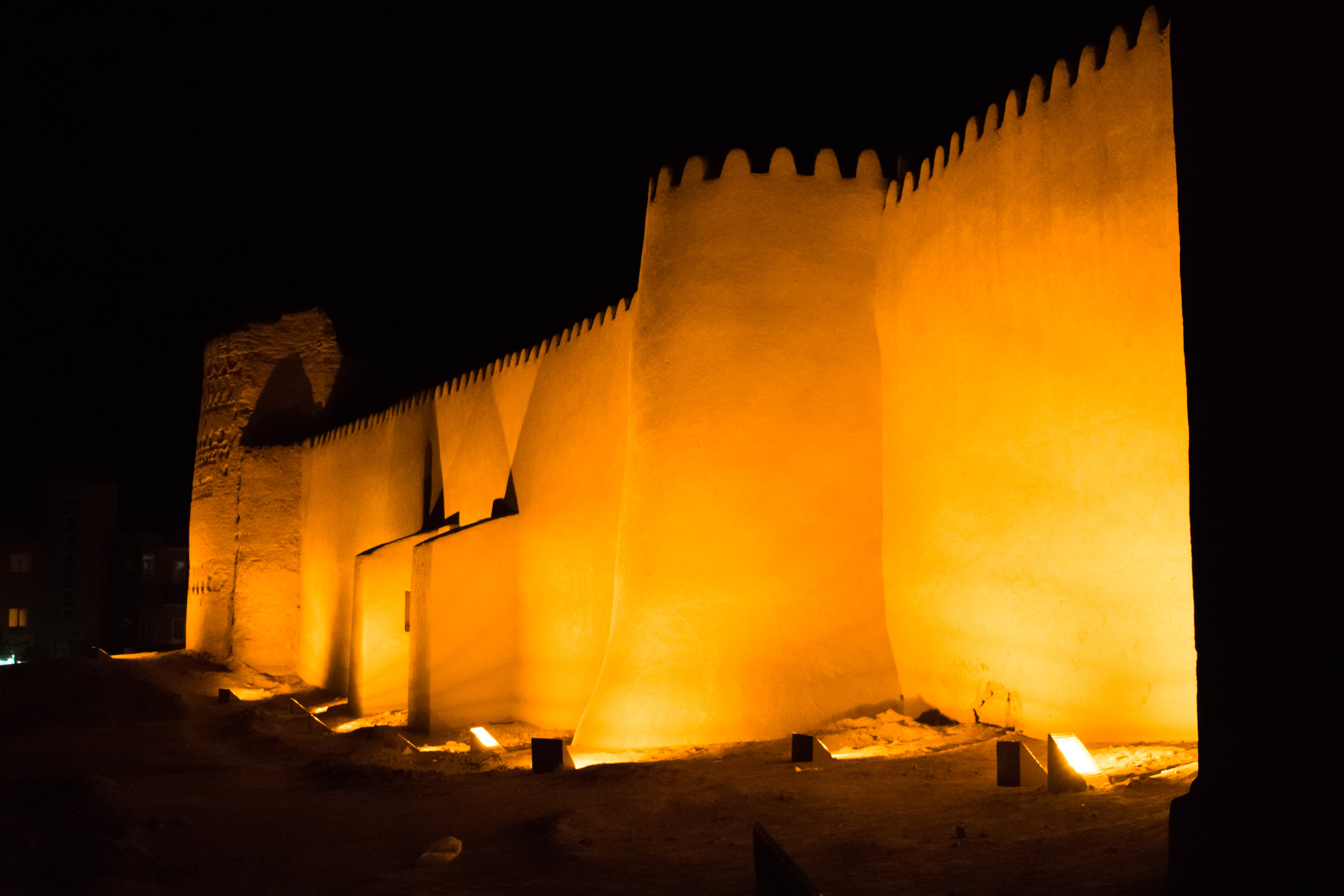
