= Abdullah Yazdi =

Mullā ʿAbdullāh Yazdī
- ملا عبد الله یزدی

Personal life
- Died: 1573
- Era: Safavid Iran
- Region: Iran
- Main interest(s): Logic (Manṭiq), Islamic philosophy, Jurisprudence (Fiqh)
- Notable work: Ḥāshiya (gloss) on Tahdhīb al-Manṭiq wa’l-Kalām by Al-Taftazani

Religious life
- Religion: Islam

Muslim leader
- Influenced by: Al-Taftazani
- Influenced: Students across Iran, Central Asia, and the Indian subcontinent (within Dars-i-Nizāmī curricula)

Mulla Abdullah Yazdi (also known as Mulla Abdullah Bahabadi Yazdi; died 1573) was a Persian scholar, logician, jurist (faqih), and scholar of the Safavid period. remembered primarily for his gloss (ḥāshiya) on Al-Taftazani's Tahdhīb al-Manṭiq wa’l-Kalām (“The Refinement of Logic and Theology”). His works circulated widely in Iran, Central Asia, and the Indian subcontinent, and his commentaries became part of the scholastic curricula of both Shiʿite and Sunni traditions especially within the Dars-i-Nizami framework.

Born in Bahabad, near Yazd, he died in 1573 (981 AH), with his final resting place at the Mosque of Ali in Najaf.

Regarded as a leading figure in Islamic logic and jurisprudence, Yazdi was institutionally recognized by the Safavid rulers. He served as manager and treasurer of the Imam Ali Shrine, a role later inherited by his descendants.

== Scholarly contributions ==
- Sharḥ Tahdhīb al-Manṭiq: Yazdi’s most famous contribution is a commentary (ḥāshiya) on Al-Taftazani's Tahdhīb al-Manṭiq wa-l-Kalām. This minor commentary on logic, which became a fundamental text in Shia and even Sunni schools for centuries. Despite its brevity, it garnered high acclaim: scholars noted that “Mulla Abdullah’s margin in logic was an exceptional and extraordinary work... mastery over logical thoughts” and that “many margins are written on his margins”.

== Intellectual influence and recognition ==
His commentaries were studied widely in Central Asia, as reflected in sources like Firdaws al-iqbāl, the Khorezmian chronicle that mentions him among notable scholars of the region.

His works were still part of the Shi’ite scholastic curriculum in nineteenth-century madrasas in Iran and India. Students from India traveled to Iran to study rational sciences under teachers influenced by Yazdi and his contemporaries.

Notably, Baha al-Din al-Amili (1547–1621), the celebrated scholar of Safavid Iran, is said to have studied under Yazdi.

Modern scholarly and religious circles continue to honor his legacy. For example, in May 2025, in Iran an international conference entitled The Logical Thoughts of Mullah Abdullah Yazdi: Comparative Analysis, Innovations, and Influence in the Tradition of Islamic Logic was held. Noor Farghan Institute has listed the thoughts of Yazdi as a research priority for the doctoral and master's education on his intellectual thought.
