= Kahnuj-e Moezabad =

Kahnuj-e Moezabad كهنوج معزاباد
- Village
- Location within Iran
- Coordinates: 30°35′51″N 56°59′07″E
- Country: Iran
- Province: Kerman
- County: Kerman
- Bakhsh: Chatrud
- Rural District: Moezziyeh

Population (2006)
  - Total: 199
- Time zone: UTC+3:30 (IRST)
  - Summer (DST): UTC+4:30 (IRDT)

Kahnuj-e Moezabad (Persian: كهنوج معزاباد, also Romanized as Kahnūj-e Mo‘ezābād and Kahnoojé Mo‘ez Abad) is a village in Moezziyeh Rural District, Chatrud District, Kerman County, Kerman Province, Iran. At the 2006 census, its population was 199, in 49 families.
