= Kahnuj Sadat =

Kahnuj Sadat كهنوج سادات
- Village
- Location within Iran
- Coordinates: 29°16′04″N 57°12′50″E
- Country: Iran
- Province: Kerman
- County: Jiroft
- Bakhsh: Sarduiyeh
- Rural District: Sarduiyeh

Population (2006)
  - Total: 421
- Time zone: UTC+3:30 (IRST)
  - Summer (DST): UTC+4:30 (IRDT)

Kahnuj Sadat (Persian: كهنوج سادات, also Romanized as Kahnūj Sādāt; also known as Kahnūj) is a village in Sarduiyeh Rural District, Sarduiyeh District, Jiroft County, Kerman Province, Iran. At the 2006 census, its population was 421, in 89 families.
