= Beheshtabad, Fars =

Beheshtabad بهشتاباد
- Village
- Location within Iran
- Coordinates: 30°01′48″N 52°26′07″E
- Country: Iran
- Province: Fars
- County: Sepidan
- Bakhsh: Beyza
- Rural District: Beyza

Population (2006)
  - Total: 104
- Time zone: UTC+3:30 (IRST)
  - Summer (DST): UTC+4:30 (IRDT)

Beheshtabad (Persian: بهشتاباد, also Romanized as Beheshtābād) is a village in Beyza Rural District, Beyza District, Sepidan County, Fars province, Iran. At the 2006 census, its population was 104, in 26 families.
