= Kahnuj, Sarbanan =

Kahnuj كهنوج
- Village
- Location within Iran
- Coordinates: 30°53′35″N 56°42′02″E
- Country: Iran
- Province: Kerman
- County: Zarand
- Bakhsh: Central
- Rural District: Sarbanan

Population (2006)
  - Total: 297
- Time zone: UTC+3:30 (IRST)
  - Summer (DST): UTC+4:30 (IRDT)

Kahnuj (Persian: كهنوج, also Romanized as Kahnūj) is a village in Sarbanan Rural District, in the Central District of Zarand County, Kerman Province, Iran. According to the 2006 census, its population was 297, in 75 families.
