= Estakhrha =

Estakhrha استخرها
- Village
- Location within Iran
- Coordinates: 28°58′55″N 56°14′41″E
- Country: Iran
- Province: Kerman
- County: Baft
- Bakhsh: Central
- Rural District: Khabar

Population (2006)
  - Total: 60
- Time zone: UTC+3:30 (IRST)
  - Summer (DST): UTC+4:30 (IRDT)

Estakhrha (Persian: استخرها, also Romanized as Estakhrhā; also known as Estakhrū’īyeh) is a village in Khabar Rural District, in the Central District of Baft County, Kerman Province, Iran. At the 2006 census, its population was 60, in 13 families.
