= Beheshtabad-e Sharif =

Beheshtabad-e Sharif بهشت ابادشريف
- Village
- Country: Iran
- Province: Sistan and Baluchestan
- County: Bampur
- Bakhsh: Central
- Rural District: Bampur-e Gharbi

Population (2006)
  - Total: 88
- Time zone: UTC+3:30 (IRST)
  - Summer (DST): UTC+4:30 (IRDT)

Beheshtabad-e Sharif (Persian: بهشت ابادشريف, also Romanized as Beheshtābād-e Sharīf) is a village in Bampur-e Gharbi Rural District, Central District, Bampur County, Sistan and Baluchestan Province, Iran. At the 2006 census, its population was 88, in 20 families.
