= Torab-e Sofla =

Torab-e Sofla تراب سفلي
- Village
- Location within Iran
- Coordinates: 30°56′51″N 50°28′37″E
- Country: Iran
- Province: Kohgiluyeh and Boyer-Ahmad
- County: Kohgiluyeh
- Bakhsh: Central
- Rural District: Rak

Population (2006)
  - Total: 20
- Time zone: UTC+3:30 (IRST)
  - Summer (DST): UTC+4:30 (IRDT)

Torab-e Sofla (Persian: تراب سفلي, also Romanized as Torāb-e Soflá; also known as Torāb-e Pā’īn) is a village in Rak Rural District, in the Central District of Kohgiluyeh County, Kohgiluyeh and Boyer-Ahmad Province, Iran. At the 2006 census, its population was 20, in 6 families.
