= Beheshtiabad =

Beheshtiabad بهشتي اباد
- Village
- Location within Iran
- Coordinates: 28°15′41″N 60°34′15″E
- Country: Iran
- Province: Sistan and Baluchestan
- County: Khash
- Bakhsh: Nukabad
- Rural District: Gowhar Kuh

Population (2006)
  - Total: 157
- Time zone: UTC+3:30 (IRST)
  - Summer (DST): UTC+4:30 (IRDT)

Beheshtiabad (Persian: بهشتي اباد, also Romanized as Beheshtīābād; also known as Beheshtābād) is a village in Gowhar Kuh Rural District, Nukabad District, Khash County, Sistan and Baluchestan Province, Iran. At the 2006 census, its population was 157, in 31 families.
