= Hojjatabad, Nasrabad =

Hojjatabad حجت‌آباد
- Village
- Location within Iran
- Coordinates: 31°44′07″N 53°53′29″E
- Country: Iran
- Province: Yazd
- County: Taft
- Bakhsh: Central
- Rural District: Nasrabad

Population (2006)
  - Total: 87
- Time zone: UTC+3:30 (IRST)
  - Summer (DST): UTC+4:30 (IRDT)

Hojjatabad (Persian: حجت‌آباد, romanized: Ḩojjatābād) is a village in Nasrabad Rural District, in the Central District of Taft County, Yazd Province, Iran. At the 2006 census, its population was 87, in 27 families.
