= Torab-e Vosta =

Torab-e Vosta تراب وسطي
- Village
- Location within Iran
- Coordinates: 30°56′51″N 50°29′41″E
- Country: Iran
- Province: Kohgiluyeh and Boyer-Ahmad
- County: Kohgiluyeh
- Bakhsh: Central
- Rural District: Rak

Population (2006)
  - Total: 163
- Time zone: UTC+3:30 (IRST)
  - Summer (DST): UTC+4:30 (IRDT)

Torab-e Vosta (Persian: تراب وسطي, also Romanized as Torāb-e Vosţá) is a village in Rak Rural District, in the Central District of Kohgiluyeh County, Kohgiluyeh and Boyer-Ahmad Province, Iran.

== Population ==
At the 2006 census, its population was 163, in 41 families.
