= Ashrafabad-e Quch =

Ashrafabad-e Quch اشرف آباد قوچ
- Village
- Location within Iran
- Coordinates: 35°36′18″N 47°41′36″E
- Country: Iran
- Province: Kurdistan
- County: Bijar
- Bakhsh: Chang Almas
- Rural District: Khosrowabad

Population (2006)
  - Total: 173
- Time zone: UTC+3:30 (IRST)
  - Summer (DST): UTC+4:30 (IRDT)

Ashrafabad-e Quch (Persian: اشرف آباد قوچ, also Romanized as Ashrafābād-e Qūch; also known as Ashrafābād) is a village in Khosrowabad Rural District, Chang Almas District, Bijar County, Kurdistan province, Iran. At the 2006 census, its population was 173, in 40 families. The village is populated by Kurds.
