= Kahnuj-e Damaneh =

Kahnuj-e Damaneh كهنوج دامنه
- Village
- Location within Iran
- Coordinates: 28°57′51″N 57°54′32″E
- Country: Iran
- Province: Kerman
- County: Bam
- Bakhsh: Central
- Rural District: Deh Bakri

Population (2006)
  - Total: 17
- Time zone: UTC+3:30 (IRST)
  - Summer (DST): UTC+4:30 (IRDT)

Kahnuj-e Damaneh (Persian: كهنوج دامنه, also Romanized as Kahnūj-e Dāmaneh; also known as Kahnūj) is a village in Deh Bakri Rural District, in the Central District of Bam County, Kerman Province, Iran. At the 2006 census, its population was 17, in 4 families.
