= Kahnuj-e Shahrokhi =

Kahnuj-e Shahrokhi كهنوج شاهرخي
- Village
- Location within Iran
- Coordinates: 29°12′17″N 57°20′28″E
- Country: Iran
- Province: Kerman
- County: Jiroft
- Bakhsh: Sarduiyeh
- Rural District: Sarduiyeh

Population (2006)
  - Total: 70
- Time zone: UTC+3:30 (IRST)
  - Summer (DST): UTC+4:30 (IRDT)

Kahnuj-e Shahrokhi (Persian: كهنوج شاهرخي, also Romanized as Kahnūj-e Shāhrokhī) is a village in Sarduiyeh Rural District, Sarduiyeh District, Jiroft County, Kerman Province, Iran. At the 2006 census, its population was 70, in 11 families.
