= Hojjatabad-e Kharaji =

Hojjatabad-e Kharaji حجت‌آباد خراجی
- Village
- Location within Iran
- Coordinates: 27°24′20″N 57°14′36″E
- Country: Iran
- Province: Hormozgan
- County: Rudan
- Bakhsh: Central
- Rural District: Abnama

Population (2006)
  - Total: 929
- Time zone: UTC+3:30 (IRST)
  - Summer (DST): UTC+4:30 (IRDT)

Hojjatabad-e Kharaji (Persian: حجت‌آباد خراجی, also Romanized as Ḩojjatābād-e Kharājī; also known as Ḩojjatābād) is a village in Abnama Rural District, in the Central District of Rudan County, Hormozgan Province, Iran. At the 2006 census, its population was 929, in 194 families.
