= Estakhruiyeh, Arzuiyeh =

Estakhruiyeh استخروئيه
- Village
- Location within Iran
- Coordinates: 28°34′04″N 56°47′29″E
- Country: Iran
- Province: Kerman
- County: Arzuiyeh
- Bakhsh: Central
- Rural District: Dehsard

Population (2006)
  - Total: 74
- Time zone: UTC+3:30 (IRST)
  - Summer (DST): UTC+4:30 (IRDT)

Estakhruiyeh (Persian: استخروئيه, also Romanized as Estakhrū’īyeh; also known as Esţarkhū’īyeh) is a village in Dehsard Rural District, in the Central District of Arzuiyeh County, Kerman Province, Iran. At the 2006 census, its population was 74, in 27 families.
