= Kahnu, Sistan and Baluchestan =

Kahnu كهنو
- Village
- Location within Iran
- Coordinates: 27°29′16″N 60°49′30″E
- Country: Iran
- Province: Sistan and Baluchestan
- County: Iranshahr
- Bakhsh: Central
- Rural District: Damen

Population (2006)
  - Total: 372
- Time zone: UTC+3:30 (IRST)
  - Summer (DST): UTC+4:30 (IRDT)

Kahnu (Persian: كهنو, also Romanized as Kahnū, Kahanow, Kahnoo, and Kahnow) is a village in Damen Rural District, in the Central District of Iranshahr County, Sistan and Baluchestan Province, Iran. At the 2006 census, its population was 372, in 81 families.
