= Beheshtabad, Kohgiluyeh and Boyer-Ahmad =

Beheshtabad بهشت اباد
- Village
- Location within Iran
- Coordinates: 30°56′40″N 50°25′00″E
- Country: Iran
- Province: Kohgiluyeh and Boyer-Ahmad
- County: Landeh
- Bakhsh: Central
- Rural District: Tayebi-ye Garmsiri-ye Shomali

Population (2006)
  - Total: 43
- Time zone: UTC+3:30 (IRST)
  - Summer (DST): UTC+4:30 (IRDT)

Beheshtabad (Persian: بهشت اباد, also Romanized as Beheshtābād) is a village in Tayebi-ye Garmsiri-ye Shomali Rural District, in the Central District of Landeh County, Kohgiluyeh and Boyer-Ahmad Province, Iran. At the 2006 census, its population was 43, in 10 families.
