= Bonestan, Jebalbarez =

Bonestan بنستان
- Village
- Location within Iran
- Coordinates: 28°49′46″N 57°54′42″E
- Country: Iran
- Province: Kerman
- County: Jiroft
- Bakhsh: Jebalbarez
- Rural District: Saghder

Population (2006)
  - Total: 235
- Time zone: UTC+3:30 (IRST)
  - Summer (DST): UTC+4:30 (IRDT)

Bonestan (Persian: بنستان, also Romanized as Bonestān and Benestān; also known as Banā Bostān) is a village in Saghder Rural District, Jebalbarez District, Jiroft County, Kerman Province, Iran. At the 2006 census, its population was 235, in 71 families.
