= Kahnuj-e Bozorg =

Kahnuj-e Bozorg كهنوج بزرگ
- Village
- Location within Iran
- Coordinates: 27°55′34″N 56°41′42″E
- Country: Iran
- Province: Hormozgan
- County: Hajjiabad
- Bakhsh: Ahmadi
- Rural District: Ahmadi

Population (2006)
  - Total: 69
- Time zone: UTC+3:30 (IRST)
  - Summer (DST): UTC+4:30 (IRDT)

Kahnuj-e Bozorg (Persian: كهنوج بزرگ, also Romanized as Kahnūj-e Bozorg; also known as Kahnūj and Kahnūj-e Aḩmadkhānī) is a village in Ahmadi Rural District, Ahmadi District, Hajjiabad County, Hormozgan Province, Iran. At the 2006 census, its population was 69, in 18 families.
