= Behabad =

City in Yazd province, Iran

Behabad Persian: بهاباد
- City
- Location within Iran
- Coordinates: 31°52′14″N 56°01′31″E
- Country: Iran
- Province: Yazd
- County: Behabad
- District: Central

Population (2016)
  - Total: 9,232
- Time zone: UTC+3:30 (IRST)

Behabad (Persian: بهاباد) (Note: Also romanized as Bahābād and Behābād; also known as Būhābād and Mahābād) is a city in the Central District of Behabad County, Yazd province, Iran, and serves as capital of the county.

== Demographics ==
=== Population ===
At the time of the 2006 National Census, the city's population was 7,199 in 1,609 households, when it was capital of the former Behabad District of Bafq County. The following census in 2011 counted 7,652 people in 2,109 households, by which time the district had been separated from the county in the establishment of Behabad County. Behabad was transferred to the new Central District as the county's capital. The 2016 census measured the population of the city as 9,232 people in 2,778 households.

== Notable people ==
- Abdullah Yazdi
