= Kahnuj, Baft =

Kahnuj كهنوج
- Village
- Country: Iran
- Province: Kerman
- County: Baft
- Bakhsh: Central
- Rural District: Gughar

Population (2006)
  - Total: 19
- Time zone: UTC+3:30 (IRST)
  - Summer (DST): UTC+4:30 (IRDT)

Kahnuj (Persian: كهنوج, also Romanized as Kahnūj) is a village in Gughar Rural District, in the Central District of Baft County, Kerman Province, Iran. At the 2006 census, its population was 19, in 4 families.
