= Hojjatabad-e Sardi =

Hojjatabad-e Sardi حجت‌آباد سردی
- Village
- Location within Iran
- Coordinates: 27°51′55″N 58°14′09″E
- Country: Iran
- Province: Kerman
- County: Rudbar-e Jonubi
- Bakhsh: Central
- Rural District: Nehzatabad

Population (2006)
  - Total: 430
- Time zone: UTC+3:30 (IRST)
  - Summer (DST): UTC+4:30 (IRDT)

Hojjat Abad Village’s Board

Hojjatabad-e Sardi (Persian: حجت‌آباد سردی, also Romanized as Hojjatābād-e Sardī) is a village in Nehzatabad Rural District, in the Central District of Rudbar-e Jonubi County, Kerman Province, Iran. At the 2006 census, its population was 430, in 96 families.
