= Torab-e Olya =

Torab-e Olya تراب عليا
- Village
- Location within Iran
- Coordinates: 30°57′23″N 50°29′36″E
- Country: Iran
- Province: Kohgiluyeh and Boyer-Ahmad
- County: Landeh
- Bakhsh: Central
- Rural District: Tayebi-ye Garmsiri-ye Shomali

Population (2006)
  - Total: 214
- Time zone: UTC+3:30 (IRST)
  - Summer (DST): UTC+4:30 (IRDT)

Torab-e Olya (Persian: تراب عليا, also Romanized as Torāb-e ‘Olyā; also known as Torāb Bālā and Torāb-e Bālā) is a village in Tayebi-ye Garmsiri-ye Shomali Rural District, in the Central District of Landeh County, Kohgiluyeh and Boyer-Ahmad Province, Iran. At the 2006 census, its population was 214, in 42 families.
