= Hojjatabad, Garizat =

Hojjatabad حجت‌آباد
- Village
- Location within Iran
- Coordinates: 31°19′08″N 54°02′01″E
- Country: Iran
- Province: Yazd
- County: Taft
- Bakhsh: Nir
- Rural District: Garizat

Population (2006)
  - Total: 270
- Time zone: UTC+3:30 (IRST)
  - Summer (DST): UTC+4:30 (IRDT)

Hojjatabad (Persian: حجت‌آباد, also Romanized as Ḩojjatābād; also known as Hojjat Abad Soflá, ’ojjatābād, and ’ojjatābād-e Soflā) is a village in Garizat Rural District, Nir District, Taft County, Yazd Province, Iran. At the 2006 census, its population was 270, in 68 families.
