= Banestan-e Sadat Mahmudi =

Banestan-e Sadat Mahmudi بنستان سادات محمودي
- Village
- Location within Iran
- Coordinates: 31°04′50″N 51°13′37″E
- Country: Iran
- Province: Kohgiluyeh and Boyer-Ahmad
- County: Dana
- Bakhsh: Pataveh
- Rural District: Sadat Mahmudi

Population (2006)
  - Total: 1,204
- Time zone: UTC+3:30 (IRST)
  - Summer (DST): UTC+4:30 (IRDT)

Banestan-e Sadat Mahmudi (Persian: بنستان سادات محمودي, also Romanized as Banestān-e Sādāt Maḩmūdī; also known as Banestān and Bonestān) is a village in Sadat Mahmudi Rural District, Pataveh District, Dana County, Kohgiluyeh and Boyer-Ahmad Province, Iran. At the 2006 census, its population was 1,204, in 241 families.
