= Beheshtabad, Dalgan =

Beheshtabad بهشت اباد
- Village
- Location within Iran
- Coordinates: 27°04′22″N 59°21′23″E
- Country: Iran
- Province: Sistan and Baluchestan
- County: Dalgan
- Bakhsh: Jolgeh-ye Chah Hashem
- Rural District: Jolgeh-ye Chah Hashem

Population (2006)
  - Total: 61
- Time zone: UTC+3:30 (IRST)
  - Summer (DST): UTC+4:30 (IRDT)

Beheshtabad (Persian: بهشت اباد, also Romanized as Beheshtābād) is a village in Jolgeh-ye Chah Hashem Rural District, Jolgeh-ye Chah Hashem District, Dalgan County, Sistan and Baluchestan Province, Iran. At the 2006 census, its population was 61, in 11 families.
