= Beheshtabad, Chaharmahal and Bakhtiari =

Beheshtabad بهشت اباد
- Village
- Location within Iran
- Coordinates: 32°01′49″N 50°37′27″E
- Country: Iran
- Province: Chaharmahal and Bakhtiari
- County: Ardal
- Bakhsh: Central
- Rural District: Poshtkuh

Population (2006)
  - Total: 319
- Time zone: UTC+3:30 (IRST)
  - Summer (DST): UTC+4:30 (IRDT)

Beheshtabad (Persian: بهشت اباد, also Romanized as Beheshtābād and Bihishtābād) is a village in Poshtkuh Rural District, in the Central District of Ardal County, Chaharmahal and Bakhtiari Province, Iran. At the 2006 census, its population was 319, in 63 families. The village is populated by Lurs.
