= Kahnuj, Mahan =

Kahnu كهنو
- Village
- Location within Iran
- Coordinates: 29°59′46″N 57°14′26″E
- Country: Iran
- Province: Kerman
- County: Kerman
- Bakhsh: Mahan
- Rural District: Mahan

Population (2006)
  - Total: 89
- Time zone: UTC+3:30 (IRST)
  - Summer (DST): UTC+4:30 (IRDT)

Kahnu (Persian: كهنو, also Romanized as Kahnū) is a village in Mahan Rural District, Mahan District, Kerman County, Kerman Province, Iran. At the 2006 census, its population was 89, in 33 families.
