= Beheshtabad, Bampur =

Beheshtabad بهشت اباد
- Village
- Location within Iran
- Coordinates: 27°09′33″N 60°10′13″E
- Country: Iran
- Province: Sistan and Baluchestan
- County: Bampur
- Bakhsh: Central
- Rural District: Bampur-e Gharbi

Population (2006)
  - Total: 420
- Time zone: UTC+3:30 (IRST)
  - Summer (DST): UTC+4:30 (IRDT)

Beheshtabad (Persian: بهشت اباد, also Romanized as Beheshtābād) is a village in Bampur-e Gharbi Rural District, Central District, Bampur County, Sistan and Baluchestan Province, Iran. At the 2006 census, its population was 420, in 91 families.
