= Kahnuj, Ahmadi =

Kahnuj كهنوج
- Village
- Location within Iran
- Coordinates: 27°55′35″N 56°41′43″E
- Country: Iran
- Province: Hormozgan
- County: Hajjiabad
- Bakhsh: Ahmadi
- Rural District: Kuh Shah

Population (2006)
  - Total: 60
- Time zone: UTC+3:30 (IRST)
  - Summer (DST): UTC+4:30 (IRDT)

Kahnuj (Persian: كهنوج, also Romanized as Kahnūj) is a village in Kuh Shah Rural District, Ahmadi District, Hajjiabad County, Hormozgan Province, Iran. At the 2006 census, its population was 60, in 18 families.
