= Banestan-e Jalil =

Banestan-e Jalil بنستان جليل
- Village
- Location within Iran
- Coordinates: 30°37′21″N 51°19′21″E
- Country: Iran
- Province: Kohgiluyeh and Boyer-Ahmad
- County: Boyer-Ahmad
- Bakhsh: Central
- Rural District: Sepidar

Population (2006)
  - Total: 66
- Time zone: UTC+3:30 (IRST)
  - Summer (DST): UTC+4:30 (IRDT)

Banestan-e Jalil (Persian: بنستان جليل, also Romanized as Banestān-e Jalīl; also known as Banestān) is a village in Sepidar Rural District, in the Central District of Boyer-Ahmad County, Kohgiluyeh and Boyer-Ahmad Province, Iran. At the 2006 census, its population was 66, in 11 families.
