= Didarak, Kerman =

Didarak ديدرك
- Village
- Location within Iran
- Coordinates: 28°36′00″N 58°12′00″E
- Country: Iran
- Province: Kerman
- County: Anbarabad
- Bakhsh: Jebalbarez-e Jonubi
- Rural District: Garmsar

Population (2006)
  - Total: 23
- Time zone: UTC+3:30 (IRST)
  - Summer (DST): UTC+4:30 (IRDT)

Didarak (Persian: ديدرك, also Romanized as Dīdarak; also known as Deh Darak) is a village in Garmsar Rural District, Jebalbarez-e Jonubi District, Anbarabad County, Kerman Province, Iran. At the 2006 census, its population was 23, in 4 families.
