= Hojjatabad, Ravar =

Hojjatabad حجت‌آباد
- Village
- Location within Iran
- Coordinates: 30°50′52″N 56°26′58″E
- Country: Iran
- Province: Kerman
- County: Ravar
- Bakhsh: Central
- Rural District: Ravar

Population (2006)
  - Total: 352
- Time zone: UTC+3:30 (IRST)
  - Summer (DST): UTC+4:30 (IRDT)

Hojjatabad (Persian: حجت‌آباد, also Romanized as Ḩojjatābād; also known as Hojjat Abad Hoomeh Zarand) is a village in Ravar Rural District, in the Central District of Ravar County, Kerman Province, Iran. At the 2006 census, its population was 352, in 101 families.
