= Behdan, South Khorasan =

Behdan بهدان
- Village
- Location within Iran
- Coordinates: 32°45′03″N 59°22′32″E
- Country: Iran
- Province: South Khorasan
- County: Birjand
- Bakhsh: Central
- Rural District: Baqeran

Population (2006)
  - Total: 305
- Time zone: UTC+3:30 (IRST)
  - Summer (DST): UTC+4:30 (IRDT)

Behdan (Persian: بهدان, also Romanized as Behdān; also known as Bīdān) is a village in Baqeran Rural District, in the Central District of Birjand County, South Khorasan Province, Iran. At the 2006 census, its population was 305, in 96 families.
