= Heydarabad, Chadegan =

Heydarabad حيدراباد
- Village
- Location within Iran
- Coordinates: 32°45′21″N 50°19′50″E
- Country: Iran
- Province: Isfahan
- County: Chadegan
- Bakhsh: Chenarud
- Rural District: Chenarud-e Shomali

Population (2006)
  - Total: 67
- Time zone: UTC+3:30 (IRST)
  - Summer (DST): UTC+4:30 (IRDT)

Heydarabad (Persian: حيدراباد, also Romanized as Ḩeydarābād; also known as Deh Ḩeydar) is a village in Chenarud-e Shomali Rural District, Chenarud District, Chadegan County, Isfahan province, Iran. At the 2006 census, its population was 67, in 15 families.
