= Bonestan, Taft =

Bonestan بنستان
- Village
- Location within Iran
- Coordinates: 31°37′00″N 54°11′36″E
- Country: Iran
- Province: Yazd
- County: Taft
- Bakhsh: Central
- Rural District: Shirkuh

Population (2006)
  - Total: 10
- Time zone: UTC+3:30 (IRST)
  - Summer (DST): UTC+4:30 (IRDT)

Bonestan (Persian: بنستان, also Romanized as Bonestān; also known as Nabestān) is a village in Shirkuh Rural District, in the Central District of Taft County, Yazd Province, Iran. At the 2006 census, its population was 10, in 4 families.
