= Kahnow, South Khorasan =

Kahnow كهنو
- Village
- Location within Iran
- Coordinates: 31°27′24″N 60°22′23″E
- Country: Iran
- Province: South Khorasan
- County: Nehbandan
- Bakhsh: Central
- Rural District: Neh

Population (2006)
  - Total: 235
- Time zone: UTC+3:30 (IRST)
  - Summer (DST): UTC+4:30 (IRDT)

Kahnow (Persian: كهنو, also Romanized as Kahnow, Kahnoo, and Kahnū; also known as Kahnūk) is a village in Neh Rural District, in the Central District of Nehbandan County, South Khorasan Province, Iran. At the 2006 census, its population was 235, in 51 families.
