= Choqapukeh =

Choqapukeh چقاپوكه
- Village
- Location within Iran
- Coordinates: 33°10′18″N 47°21′44″E
- Country: Iran
- Province: Ilam
- County: Darreh Shahr
- Bakhsh: Central
- Rural District: Zarrin Dasht

Population (2006)
  - Total: 445
- Time zone: UTC+3:30 (IRST)
  - Summer (DST): UTC+4:30 (IRDT)

Choqapukeh (Persian: چقاپوكه, also Romanized as Choqāpūkeh; also known as Ashrafābād) is a village in Zarrin Dasht Rural District, in the Central District of Darreh Shahr County, Ilam Province, Iran. At the 2006 census, its population was 445, in 90 families. The village is populated by Kurds.
