= Hojjatabad-e Yazdiha =

Hojjatabad-e Yazdiha حجت‌آباد یزدی‌ها
- Village
- Location within Iran
- Coordinates: 30°16′51″N 56°30′12″E
- Country: Iran
- Province: Kerman
- County: Kerman
- Bakhsh: Central
- Rural District: Ekhtiarabad

Population (2006)
  - Total: 52
- Time zone: UTC+3:30 (IRST)
  - Summer (DST): UTC+4:30 (IRDT)

Hojjatabad-e Yazdiha (Persian: حجت‌آباد یزدی‌ها, also Romanized as Ḩojjatābād-e Yazdīhā; also known as Ḩojjatābād) is a village in Ekhtiarabad Rural District, in the Central District of Kerman County, Kerman Province, Iran. In the 2006 census, its population was 52, in 11 families.
