= Estakhruiyeh, Kerman =

Estakhruiyeh استخروييه
- Village
- Location within Iran
- Coordinates: 30°20′12″N 56°42′56″E
- Country: Iran
- Province: Kerman
- County: Kerman
- Bakhsh: Central
- Rural District: Baghin

Population (2006)
  - Total: 354
- Time zone: UTC+3:30 (IRST)
  - Summer (DST): UTC+4:30 (IRDT)
- Website: http://www.estakhruiyeh.ir/

Estakhruiyeh (Persian: استخروييه, also Romanized as Estakhrū’īyeh and Estakhroo’eyeh; also known as Estarkhū’īyeh and Ishtalkhu) is a village in Baghin Rural District, in the Central District of Kerman County, Kerman Province, Iran. At the time of the 2006 census, its population was 354, including 84 families.
