= Ashrafabad, Azna =

Ashrafabad اشرف اباد
- Village
- Location within Iran
- Coordinates: 33°23′45″N 49°31′31″E
- Country: Iran
- Province: Lorestan
- County: Azna
- Bakhsh: Central
- Rural District: Pachehlak-e Gharbi

Population (2006)
  - Total: 351
- Time zone: UTC+3:30 (IRST)
  - Summer (DST): UTC+4:30 (IRDT)

Ashrafabad (Persian: اشرف اباد, also Romanized as Ashrafābād and Ashrāfābād) is a village in Pachehlak-e Gharbi Rural District, in the Central District of Azna County, Lorestan Province, Iran. At the 2006 census, its population was 351, in 84 families.
