= Hojjatabad, Mashhad =

Hojjatabad حجت‌آباد
- Village
- Location within Iran
- Coordinates: 36°16′31″N 59°41′33″E
- Country: Iran
- Province: Razavi Khorasan
- County: Mashhad
- Bakhsh: Central
- Rural District: Kenevist

Population (2006)
  - Total: 2,375
- Time zone: UTC+3:30 (IRST)
  - Summer (DST): UTC+4:30 (IRDT)

Hojjatabad (Persian: حجت‌آباد, also Romanized as Ḩojjatābād) is a village in Kenevist Rural District, in the Central District of Mashhad County, Razavi Khorasan Province, Iran. At the 2006 census, its population was 2,375, in 557 families.
