= Hojjatabad-e Olya, Yazd =

Hojjatabad-e Olya حجت‌آباد علیا
- Village
- Location within Iran
- Coordinates: 32°09′11″N 54°04′56″E
- Country: Iran
- Province: Yazd
- County: Saduq
- Bakhsh: Central
- Rural District: Rostaq

Population (2006)
  - Total: 17
- Time zone: UTC+3:30 (IRST)
  - Summer (DST): UTC+4:30 (IRDT)

Hojjatabad-e Olya (Persian: حجت‌آباد علیا, also Romanized as Ḩojjatābād-e ‘Olyā; also known as Ḩojjatābād) is a village in Rostaq Rural District, in the Central District of Saduq County, Yazd Province, Iran. At the 2006 census, its population was 17, in 5 families.
