= Kahnuj, Pa Qaleh =

Kahnuj كهنوج
- Village
- Location within Iran
- Coordinates: 30°15′12″N 55°31′11″E
- Country: Iran
- Province: Kerman
- County: Shahr-e Babak
- Bakhsh: Central
- Rural District: Pa Qaleh

Population (2006)
  - Total: 141
- Time zone: UTC+3:30 (IRST)
  - Summer (DST): UTC+4:30 (IRDT)

Kahnuj (Persian: كهنوج, also Romanized as Kahnūj; also known as Kahnow) is a village in Pa Qaleh Rural District, in the Central District of Shahr-e Babak County, Kerman Province, Iran. At the 2006 census, its population was 141, in 36 families.
