= Kahnuh-e Modim =

Kahnuh-e Modim كهنوح مديم
- Village
- Location within Iran
- Coordinates: 30°28′12″N 56°54′52″E
- Country: Iran
- Province: Kerman
- County: Kerman
- Bakhsh: Central
- Rural District: Zangiabad

Population (2006)
  - Total: 853
- Time zone: UTC+3:30 (IRST)
  - Summer (DST): UTC+4:30 (IRDT)

Kahnuh-e Modim (Persian: كهنوح مديم, also Romanized as Kahnūḥ-e Modīm; also known as Kahnooj, Kahnū, Kahnūj, Kahnūj-e Modīm, and Kahnūj-e Mowdīm) is a village in Zangiabad Rural District, in the Central District of Kerman County, Kerman Province, Iran. At the 2006 census, its population was 853, in 194 families.
