= Hojjatabad-e Olya, Kermanshah =

Hojjatabad-e Olya حجت‌آباد علیا
- Village
- Location within Iran
- Coordinates: 34°29′00″N 47°00′07″E
- Country: Iran
- Province: Kermanshah
- County: Kermanshah
- Bakhsh: Central
- Rural District: Miyan Darband

Population (2006)
  - Total: 175
- Time zone: UTC+3:30 (IRST)
  - Summer (DST): UTC+4:30 (IRDT)

Hojjatabad-e Olya (Persian: حجت‌آباد علیا, also Romanized as Ḩojjatābād-e ‘Olyā) is a village in Miyan Darband Rural District, in the Central District of Kermanshah County, Kermanshah Province, Iran. At the 2006 census, its population was 175, in 44 families.
