= Jolgeh Rural District (Behabad County) =

Rural district in Yazd province, Iran

Jolgeh Rural District Persian: دهستان جلگه
- Rural District
- Location within Iran
- Coordinates: 32°08′24″N 56°01′27″E
- Country: Iran
- Province: Yazd
- County: Behabad
- District: Central
- Capital: Ahmadabad

Population (2016)
  - Total: 4,160
- Time zone: UTC+3:30 (IRST)

Jolgeh Rural District (Persian: دهستان جلگه) is in the Central District of Behabad County, Yazd province, Iran. Its capital is the village of Ahmadabad.

== Demographics ==
=== Population ===
At the time of the 2006 National Census, the rural district's population (as a part of the former Behabad District of Bafq County) was 3,785 in 946 households. There were 3,422 inhabitants in 1,025 households at the following census of 2011, by which time the district had been separated from the county in the establishment of Behabad County. The rural district was transferred to the new Central District. The 2016 census measured the population of the rural district as 4,160 in 1,253 households. The most populous of its 72 villages was Ahmadabad, with 1,260 people.
