= Behabad District =

Former district in Yazd province, Iran

Behabad District Persian: بخش بهاباد
- Former District
- Location within Iran
- Coordinates: 32°00′N 56°05′E
- Country: Iran
- Province: Yazd
- County: Bafq
- Capital: Behabad

Population (2006)
  - Total: 14,577
- Time zone: UTC+3:30 (IRST)

Behabad District (Persian: بخش بهاباد) is a former administrative division of Bafq County, Yazd province, Iran. Its capital was the city of Behabad.

== History ==
After the 2006 National Census, the district was separated from the county in the establishment of Behabad County.

== Demographics ==
=== Population ===
At the time of the 2006 census, the district's population was 14,577 in 3,564 households.

=== Administrative divisions ===
Behabad District Population
Administrative Divisions	2006
Asfyj RD	2,070
Banestan RD	1,523
Jolgeh RD	3,785
Behabad (city)	7,199
Total	14,577
RD = Rural District
