= Bayaz Rural District =

Rural district in Kerman province, Iran

Bayaz Rural District Persian: دهستان بياض
- Rural District
- Location within Iran
- Coordinates: 30°41′53″N 55°28′35″E
- Country: Iran
- Province: Kerman
- County: Anar
- District: Anar
- Capital: Lotfabad

Population (2016)
  - Total: 10,415
- Time zone: UTC+3:30 (IRST)

Bayaz Rural District (Persian: دهستان بياض) is in Anar District of Anar County, Kerman province, Iran. Its capital is the village of Lotfabad.

== Demographics ==
=== Population ===
At the time of the 2006 National Census, the rural district's population (as a part of Rafsanjan County) was 8,325 in 2,026 households. There were 11,436 inhabitants in 2,990 households at the following census of 2011, by which time the district had been separated from the county in the establishment of Anar County. The 2016 census measured the population of the rural district as 10,415 in 3,072 households. The most populous of its 45 villages was Bayaz, with 3,869 people.
