= Banestan Rural District =

Rural district in Yazd province, Iran

Banestan Rural District Persian: دهستان بنستان
- Rural District
- Location within Iran
- Coordinates: 31°56′04″N 56°17′43″E
- Country: Iran
- Province: Yazd
- County: Behabad
- District: Asfyj
- Capital: Banestan

Population (2016)
  - Total: 1,765
- Time zone: UTC+3:30 (IRST)

Banestan Rural District (Persian: دهستان بنستان) is in Asfyj District of Behabad County, Yazd province, Iran. Its capital is the village of Banestan.

== Demographics ==
=== Population ===
At the time of the 2006 National Census, the rural district's population (as a part of the former Behabad District of Bafq County) was 1,523 in 484 households. There were 2,130 inhabitants in 744 households at the following census of 2011, by which time the district had been separated from the county in the establishment of Behabad County. The rural district was transferred to the new Asfyj District. The 2016 census measured the population of the rural district as 1,765 in 635 households. The most populous of its 38 villages was Banestan, with 706 people.
