= Asfyj District =

District in Yazd province, Iran

Asfyj District Persian: بخش اسفیچ
- District
- Location within Iran
- Coordinates: 31°53′20″N 56°17′17″E
- Country: Iran
- Province: Yazd
- County: Behabad
- Capital: Asfyj

Population (2016)
  - Total: 3,829
- Time zone: UTC+3:30 (IRST)

Asfyj District (Persian: بخش اسفیچ) is in Behabad County, Yazd province, Iran. Its capital is the village of Asfyj.

== History ==
After the 2006 National Census, Behabad District was separated from Bafq County in the establishment of Behabad County, which was divided into two districts and three rural districts, with Behabad as its capital and only city.

== Demographics ==
=== Population ===
At the time of the 2011 census, the district's population was 4,257 people in 1,397 households. The 2016 census measured the population of the district as 3,829 inhabitants in 1,349 households.

=== Administrative divisions ===
Asfyj District Population
Administrative Divisions	2011	2016
Asfyj RD	2,127	2,064
Banestan RD	2,130	1,765
Total	4,257	3,829
RD = Rural District
