= Central District (Behabad County) =

District in Yazd province, Iran

Central District (Behabad County) Persian: بخش مرکزی شهرستان بهاباد
- District
- Location within Iran
- Coordinates: 32°08′24″N 56°01′27″E
- Country: Iran
- Province: Yazd
- County: Behabad
- Capital: Behabad

Population (2016)
  - Total: 13,392
- Time zone: UTC+3:30 (IRST)

The Central District of Behabad County (Persian: بخش مرکزی شهرستان بهاباد) is in Yazd province, Iran. Its capital is the city of Behabad.

== History ==
After the 2006 National Census, Behabad District was separated from Bafq County in the establishment of Behabad County, which was divided into two districts and three rural districts, with Behabad as its capital and only city.

== Demographics ==
=== Population ===
At the time of the 2011 census, the district's population was 11,074 people in 3,134 households. The 2016 census measured the population of the district as 13,392 inhabitants in 4,031 households.

=== Administrative divisions ===
Central District (Behabad County) Population
Administrative Divisions	2011	2016
Jolgeh RD	3,422	4,160
Behabad (city)	7,652	9,232
Total	11,074	13,392
RD = Rural District
