= Asfyj Rural District =

Rural district in Yazd province, Iran

Asfyj Rural District Persian: دهستان اسفيج
- Rural District
- Location within Iran
- Coordinates: 31°46′06″N 56°19′14″E
- Country: Iran
- Province: Yazd
- County: Behabad
- District: Asfyj
- Capital: Asfyj

Population (2016)
  - Total: 2,064
- Time zone: UTC+3:30 (IRST)

Asfyj Rural District (Persian: دهستان اسفيج) is in Asfyj District of Behabad County, Yazd province, Iran. Its capital is the village of Asfyj.

== Demographics ==
=== Population ===
At the time of the 2006 National Census, the rural district's population (as a part of the former Behabad District of Bafq County) was 2,070 in 525 households. There were 2,127 inhabitants in 653 households at the following census of 2011, by which time the district had been separated from the county in the establishment of Behabad County. The rural district was transferred to the new Asfyj District. The 2016 census measured the population of the rural district as 2,064 in 714 households. The most populous of its 61 villages was Asfyj, with 619 people.
