= Hoseynabad Rural District (Anar County) =

Rural district in Kerman province, Iran

Hoseynabad Rural District Persian: دهستان حسين آباد
- Rural District
- Location within Iran
- Coordinates: 30°54′21″N 55°11′43″E
- Country: Iran
- Province: Kerman
- County: Anar
- District: Anar
- Capital: Aminshahr

Population (2016)
  - Total: 6,537
- Time zone: UTC+3:30 (IRST)

Hoseynabad Rural District (Persian: دهستان حسين آباد) is in Anar District of Anar County, Kerman province, Iran. It is administered from the city of Aminshahr. (Note: Formerly the village of Hoseynabad)

== Demographics ==
=== Population ===
At the time of the 2006 National Census, the rural district's population (as a part of Rafsanjan County) was 6,394 in 1,561 households. There were 6,215 inhabitants in 1,707 households at the following census of 2011, by which time the district had been separated from the county in the establishment of Anar County. The 2016 census measured the population of the rural district as 6,537 in 1,898 households. The most populous of its 46 villages was Golshan, with 2,744 people.
