= Behabad County =

County in Yazd province, Iran

Bahabad County Persian: شهرستان بهاباد
- County
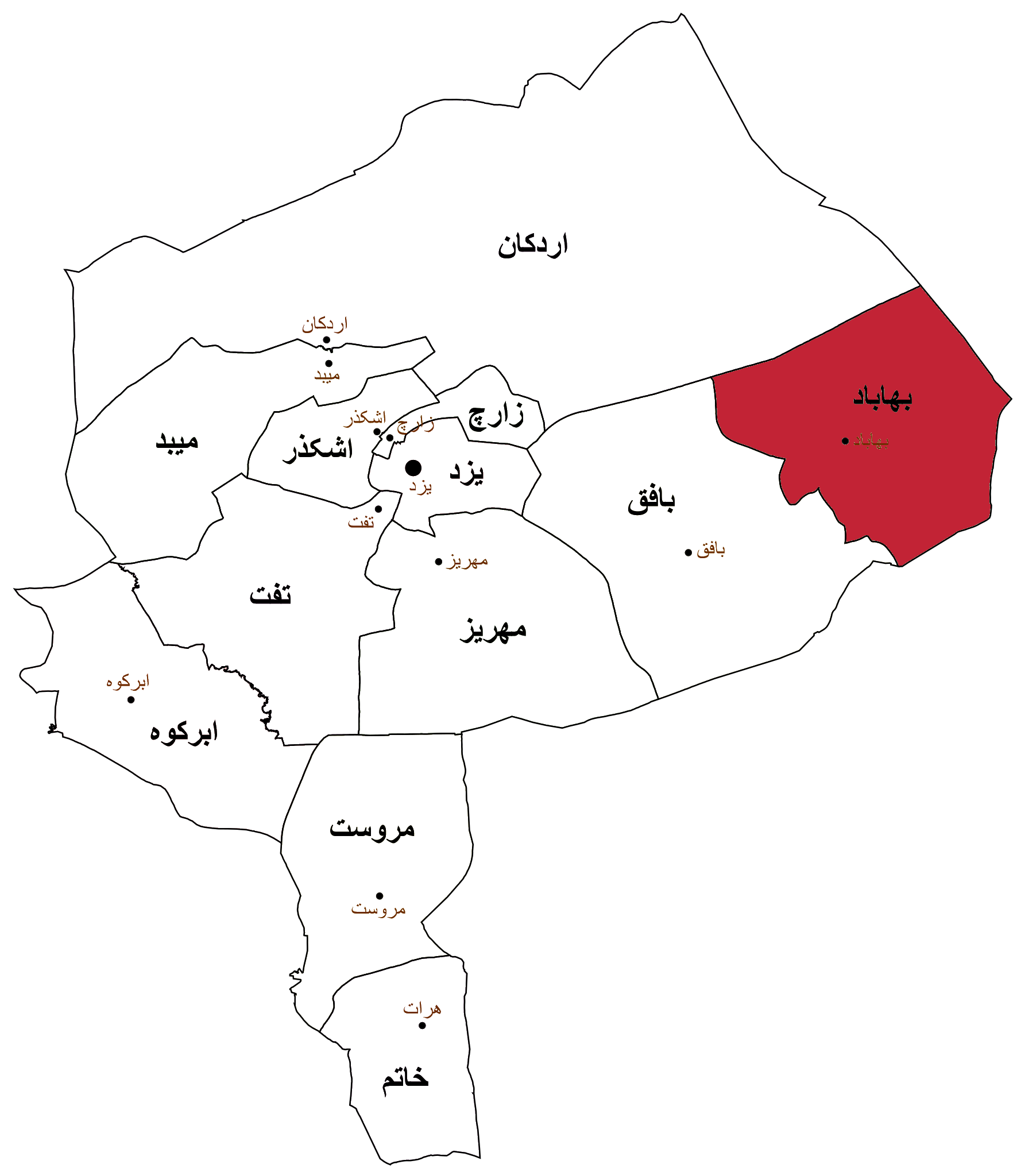
- Location of Behabad County in Yazd province

- Location of Yazd province in Iran
- Coordinates: 32°00′N 56°05′E
- Country: Iran
- Province: Yazd
- Capital: Behabad
- Districts: Central, Asfyj

Population (2016)
  - Total: 17,221
- Time zone: UTC+3:30 (IRST)

Behabad County (Persian: شهرستان بهاباد) is in Yazd province, Iran. Its capital is the city of Behabad.

== History ==
After the 2006 National Census, Behabad District was separated from Bafq County in the establishment of Behabad County, which was divided into two districts and three rural districts, with Behabad as its capital and only city.

== Demographics ==
=== Population ===
At the time of the 2011 census, the county's population was 15,331 people in 4,523 households. The 2016 census measured the population of the county as 17,221 in 5,380 households.

=== Administrative divisions ===
Behabad County's population history and administrative structure over two consecutive censuses are shown in the following table.

Behabad County Population
Administrative Divisions	2011	2016
Central District	11,074	13,392
Jolgeh RD	3,422	4,160
Behabad (city)	7,652	9,232
Asfyj District	4,257	3,829
Asfyj RD	2,127	2,064
Banestan RD	2,130	1,765
Total	15,331	17,221
RD = Rural District

== See also ==
Media related to Behabad County at Wikimedia Commons
