= Anar District =

District in Kerman province, Iran

Anar District Persian: بخش انار
- District
- Location within Iran
- Coordinates: 30°51′N 55°19′E
- Country: Iran
- Province: Kerman
- County: Anar
- Capital: Anar

Population (2016)
  - Total: 36,897
- Time zone: UTC+3:30 (IRST)

Anar District (Persian: بخش انار) is in Anar County of Kerman province, Iran. Its capital is the city of Anar.

== History ==
In 2009, the district was separated from Rafsanjan County in the establishment of Anar County, which was divided into one district and two rural districts, with Anar as its capital.

== Demographics ==
=== Population ===
At the time of the 2006 census, the district's population (as a part of Rafsanjan County) was 31,554 in 7,803 households. The following census in 2011 counted 35,295 people in 9,566 households. The 2016 census measured the population of the district as 36,897 inhabitants in 10,918 households.

=== Administrative divisions ===
Anar District Population (Note: As a part of Rafsanjan County at the 2006 census)
| Administrative Divisions | 2006 | 2011 | 2016 |
|---|---|---|---|
| Bayaz RD | 8,325 | 11,436 | 10,415 |
| Hoseynabad RD | 6,394 | 6,215 | 6,537 |
| Aminshahr (city) | 4,044 | 4,555 | 4,413 |
| Anar (city) | 12,791 | 13,089 | 15,532 |
| Total | 31,554 | 35,295 | 36,897 |
RD = Rural District
