= Anar County =

County in Kerman province, Iran

Anar County Persian: شهرستان انار
- County
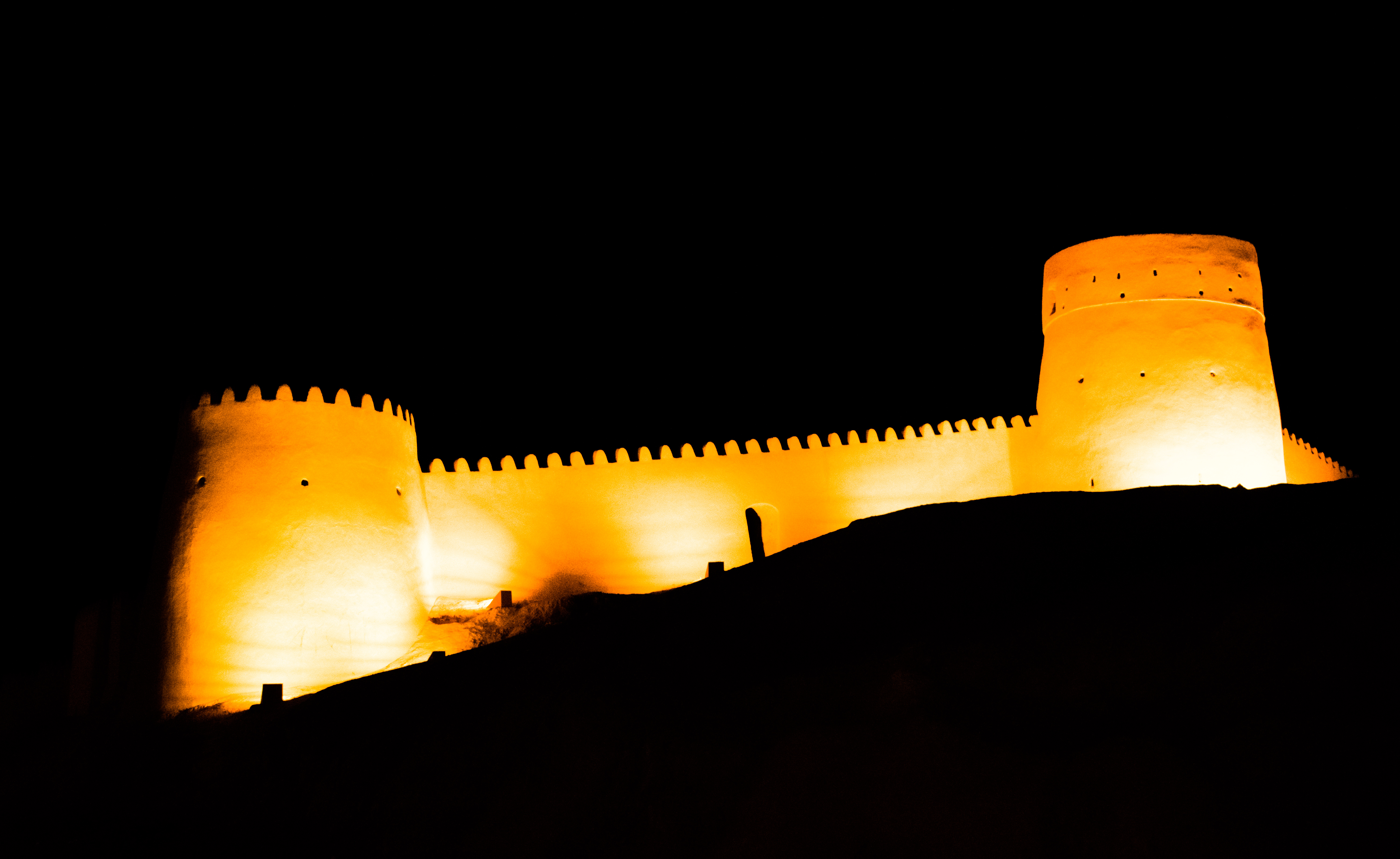
- Arg-e Anar

- Location of Anar County in Kerman province (top left, pink)

- Location of Kerman province in Iran
- Coordinates: 30°51′N 55°19′E
- Country: Iran
- Province: Kerman
- Capital: Anar
- Districts: Anar

Population (2016)
  - Total: 36,897
- Time zone: UTC+3:30 (IRST)

Anar County (Persian: شهرستان انار) is in Kerman province, Iran. Its capital is the city of Anar.

== History ==
In 2009, Anar District was separated from Rafsanjan County in the establishment of Anar County, which was divided into one district and two rural districts, with Anar as its capital.

== Demographics ==
=== Population ===
At the time of the 2011 National Census, the county's population was 35,295 in 9,566 households. The 2016 census measured the population of the county as 36,897 in 10,918 households.

=== Administrative divisions ===
Anar County's population history and administrative structure over two consecutive censuses are shown in the following table.

Anar County Population
Administrative Divisions	2011	2016
Anar District	35,295	36,897
Bayaz RD	11,436	10,415
Hoseynabad RD	6,215	6,537
Aminshahr (city)	4,555	4,413
Anar (city)	13,089	15,532
Total	35,295	36,897
RD = Rural District

== See also ==
Media related to Anar County at Wikimedia Commons
