= Gorji =

Gorji (Persian: گرجي) may refer to:

- Gorji, Yazd
- Gorji, Kermanshah
- Gorji, Kurdistan
- Gorji, Lorestan
- Gorji-ye Olya, Razavi Khorasan Province
- Gorji-ye Sofla, Razavi Khorasan Province
- Gorji, Zaveh, Razavi Khorasan Province
- Gorji, Semnan
- Gorji Rural District, in Isfahan Province
- Gorji (surname), several people
- Gorjiduz, leather craftsmen who created Georgian-style shoes in 19th century Qajar Iran
