= Khur, Iran =

Khur or Khowr or Khaur or Khvor (Persian: خور) may refer to the following locations in Iran:

- Khur, Karaj, a village in Karaj County, Alborz Province, Iran
- Khur, Savojbolagh, a village in Savojbolagh County, Alborz Province, Iran
- Khvor-e Shahabi, a village in Bushehr Province, Iran
- Khur, East Azerbaijan, a village in East Azerbaijan Province, Iran
- Khur, Fars, a city in Fars Province, Iran
- Khur, Farashband, a village in Fars Province, Iran
- Khvor-e Khiari, a village in Hormozgan Province, Iran
- Khur-e Mollu, a village in Hormozgan Province, Iran
- Khur, Isfahan, a city in Isfahan Province, Iran
- Khowr, Kerman, a village in Kerman Province, Iran
- Khur, Razavi Khorasan, a village in Razavi Khorasan Province, Iran
- Khvor-e Olya, a village in Razavi Khorasan Province, Iran
- Khvor-e Sofla, a village in Razavi Khorasan Province, Iran
- Khvor-e Vosta, a village in Razavi Khorasan Province, Iran
- Khvor, South Khorasan, a village in South Khorasan Province, Iran
- Khowr, South Khorasan, a village in South Khorasan Province, Iran
