= Qorqi =

Qorqi or Qarqi (Persian: قرقي) may refer to:

- Qarqi, Razavi Khorasan
- Qorqi-ye Olya
- Qorqi-ye Sofla
