= Gevanduk =

Gevanduk گوندوك
- Village
- Location within Iran
- Coordinates: 36°20′31″N 59°40′41″E
- Country: Iran
- Province: Razavi Khorasan
- County: Mashhad
- Bakhsh: Central
- Rural District: Tabadkan

Population (2006)
  - Total: 167
- Time zone: UTC+3:30 (IRST)
  - Summer (DST): UTC+4:30 (IRDT)

Gevanduk (Persian: گوندوك, also Romanized as Gevandūk; also known as Gandavak) is a village in Tabadkan Rural District, in the Central District of Mashhad County, Razavi Khorasan Province, Iran. At the 2006 census, its population was 167, in 36 families.

Cities, towns and places near Gevanduk include Gandavak, Deh Mozaffar and Zeyn ol `Abedin . The closest major cities include Mashhad, Neyshabur, Sabzevar and Asgabat.
