= Khin (disambiguation) =

Khin is a musical instrument of Nepal.

Khin or KHIN may also refer to:

- Khin (name)
- Khin, Iran (disambiguation), multiple places
- Khin, Kalikot, a village development committee in north-western Nepal
- KHIN, a TV station of Iowa PBS network, U.S.

== See also ==
- Khin-U, a town in Myanmar
- Khin-U Township, in Myanmar
