= Gjorgji =

Gjorgji is a Macedonian given name and may refer to:

- Gjorgji Abadžiev (1910–1963), Macedonian prosaist and publicist
- Gjorgji Čekovski (born 1979), Macedonian professional basketball player
- Gjorgji Hristov (born 1976), Macedonian football coach and former striker
- Gjorgji Ivanov (born 1960), the President of the Republic of Macedonia, in office in 2009–2019
- Gjorgji Jovanovski (born 1956), Macedonian football manager and former player
- Gjorgji Knjazev (born 1971), former Macedonian professional basketball Shooting guard
- Gjorgji Kolozov (1948–2003), Macedonian actor
- Gjorgji Markovski (born 1986), alpine skier who competed for Macedonia at the 2006 Winter Olympics
- Gjorgji Mojsov (born 1985), Macedonian footballer
- Gjorgji Pulevski (1817–1895), writer and revolutionary from Galičnik, today in the Republic of Macedonia
- Gjorgji Talevski (born 1976), former Macedonian professional basketball Power forward
- Gjorgji Tanušev (born 1991), Macedonian football midfielder playing in Serbian First League club Kolubara

== See also ==
- Gjorgji Kyçyku Stadium, a stadium in Pogradec, Albania
- Gorgi (disambiguation)
- Gorji (disambiguation)
- Jorg (disambiguation)
