= Tus =

Tus or TUS may refer to:

== Education ==
- Technological University of the Shannon, Ireland
- Tokyo University of Science, Japan

== People ==
- Anton Tus (1931–2023), Croatian general
- Christos Tusis ("Tus"; born 1986), Greek rapper

== Places ==
=== Iran ===
- Tus, Iran, a city
  - Tus citadel, a Sassanid-era citadel
- Tus Rural District
  - Tus-e Olya, a village
  - Tus-e Sofla, a village

=== United States ===
- Tampa Union Station, Florida
- Tucson International Airport, Arizona (IATA:TUS)

=== Elsewhere ===
- Río Tus, a river in Spain

== Other uses ==
- Tus (biology), the ter-binding protein
- Thales Underwater Systems, an international defence contractor
- Tuscarora language, spoken in North America (ISO 639-3:tus)
- The Unicode Standard, a text encoding standard
