= Kalateh-ye Chapar Qaleh =

Kalateh-ye Chapar Qaleh كلاته چاپارقلعه
- Village
- Country: Iran
- Province: Razavi Khorasan
- County: Mashhad
- Bakhsh: Central
- Rural District: Kenevist

Population (2006)
  - Total: 24
- Time zone: UTC+3:30 (IRST)
  - Summer (DST): UTC+4:30 (IRDT)

Kalateh-ye Chapar Qaleh (Persian: كلاته چاپارقلعه, also Romanized as Kalāteh-ye Chāpār Qal‘eh) is a village in Kenevist Rural District, in the Central District of Mashhad County, Razavi Khorasan Province, Iran. At the 2006 census, its population was 24, in 6 families.
