= Takhteh-ye Kazemabad =

Takhteh-ye Kazemabad تخته كاظم اباد
- Village
- Interactive map of Takhteh-ye Kazemabad
- Country: Iran
- Province: Razavi Khorasan
- County: Mashhad
- Bakhsh: Central
- Rural District: Tus

Population (2006)
  - Total: 224
- Time zone: UTC+3:30 (IRST)
  - Summer (DST): UTC+4:30 (IRDT)

Takhteh-ye Kazemabad (Persian: تخته كاظم اباد, also Romanized as Takhteh-ye Kāẓemābād) is a village in Tus Rural District, in the Central District of Mashhad County, Razavi Khorasan Province, Iran. At the 2006 census, its population was 224, in 59 families.
