= Khan Saadat =

Khan Saadat خان سعادت
- Village
- Location within Iran
- Coordinates: 36°31′02″N 59°21′59″E
- Country: Iran
- Province: Razavi Khorasan
- County: Mashhad
- Bakhsh: Central
- Rural District: Miyan Velayat

Population (2006)
  - Total: 346
- Time zone: UTC+3:30 (IRST)
  - Summer (DST): UTC+4:30 (IRDT)

Khan Saadat (Persian: خان سعادت, also Romanized as Khān Sa‘ādat) is a village in Miyan Velayat Rural District, in the Central District of Mashhad County, Razavi Khorasan Province, Iran. At the 2006 census, its population was 346, in 82 families.
