= Shahrdansh =

Shahrdansh شهردانش
- Village
- Interactive map of Shahrdansh
- Country: Iran
- Province: Razavi Khorasan
- County: Mashhad
- Bakhsh: Central
- Rural District: Tus

Population (2006)
  - Total: 14,839
- Time zone: UTC+3:30 (IRST)
  - Summer (DST): UTC+4:30 (IRDT)

Shahrdansh (Persian: شهردانش, also Romanized as Shahrdānsh) is a village in Tus Rural District, in the Central District of Mashhad County, Razavi Khorasan Province, Iran. At the 2006 census, its population was 14,839, in 3,745 families.
