= Gorgi =

Gorgi may refer to:

== Places ==
- Gorgi, Iran, a village in Iran
- Seyl Gorgi, a village in Iran
- Gorgi-ye Manderek, a village in Iran

== People ==
- Abdelaziz Gorgi (1928–2008), Tunisian artist
- Gorgi Coghlan, Australian television presenter
- Ǵorǵi Hristov (born 1976), footballer and coach
- Gorgi Krasovski, Georgian footballer
- Ǵorǵi Kolozov (1948–2003), Macedonian actor
- Gorgi Popstefanov (born 1987), Macedonian road racing cyclist
- Gorgi Sobhi (1884–1964) Egyptian medical professor

== See also ==
- Gurgi (disambiguation)
