= Shir Hesar, Miyan Velayat =

Shir Hesar شيرحصار
- Village
- Location within Iran
- Coordinates: 36°34′34″N 59°23′23″E
- Country: Iran
- Province: Razavi Khorasan
- County: Mashhad
- Bakhsh: Central
- Rural District: Miyan Velayat

Population (2006)
  - Total: 431
- Time zone: UTC+3:30 (IRST)
  - Summer (DST): UTC+4:30 (IRDT)

Shir Hesar (Persian: شيرحصار, also Romanized as Shīr Ḩeşār) is a village in Miyan Velayat Rural District, in the Central District of Mashhad County, Razavi Khorasan Province, Iran. At the 2006 census, its population was 431, in 102 families.
