= Panj Maneh =

Panj Maneh پنج منه
- Village
- Location within Iran
- Coordinates: 36°45′10″N 59°38′33″E
- Country: Iran
- Province: Razavi Khorasan
- County: Mashhad
- Bakhsh: Central
- Rural District: Kardeh

Population (2006)
  - Total: 36
- Time zone: UTC+3:30 (IRST)
  - Summer (DST): UTC+4:30 (IRDT)

Panj Maneh (Persian: پنج منه; also known as Panj Shanbeh) is a village in Kardeh Rural District, in the Central District of Mashhad County, Razavi Khorasan Province, Iran. At the 2006 census, its population was 36, in 7 families.
