= Qasr, Mashhad =

Qasr قصر
- Village
- Location within Iran
- Coordinates: 36°22′56″N 59°41′59″E
- Country: Iran
- Province: Razavi Khorasan
- County: Mashhad
- Bakhsh: Central
- Rural District: Tabadkan

Population (2006)
  - Total: 482
- Time zone: UTC+3:30 (IRST)
  - Summer (DST): UTC+4:30 (IRDT)

Qasr (Persian: قصر, also Romanized as Qaşr) is a village in Tabadkan Rural District, in the Central District of Mashhad County, Razavi Khorasan Province, Iran. At the 2006 census, its population was 482, in 125 families.
