= Gonabad, Mashhad =

Gonabad گن‌آباد
- Village
- Location within Iran
- Coordinates: 36°33′30″N 59°17′12″E
- Country: Iran
- Province: Razavi Khorasan
- County: Mashhad
- Bakhsh: Central
- Rural District: Miyan Velayat

Population (2006)
  - Total: 531
- Time zone: UTC+3:30 (IRST)
  - Summer (DST): UTC+4:30 (IRDT)

Gonabad (Persian: گن‌آباد, also Romanized as Gonābād; also known as Gūnābād) is a village in Miyan Velayat Rural District, in the Central District of Mashhad County, Razavi Khorasan Province, Iran. At the 2006 census, its population was 531, in 152 families.
