= Abeshki, Razavi Khorasan =

Abeshki ابشكي
- Village
- Location within Iran
- Coordinates: 36°26′06″N 59°59′45″E
- Country: Iran
- Province: Razavi Khorasan
- County: Mashhad
- Bakhsh: Central
- Rural District: Kenevist

Population (2006)
  - Total: 129
- Time zone: UTC+3:30 (IRST)
  - Summer (DST): UTC+4:30 (IRDT)

Abeshki (Persian: ابشكي, also Romanized as Ābeshkī; also known as Āvoshkī and Aveshkī) is a village in Kenevist Rural District, in the Central District of Mashhad County, Razavi Khorasan Province, Iran. At the 2006 census, its population was 129, in 32 families.

== See also ==
- List of cities, towns and villages in Razavi Khorasan Province
