= Nazerabad =

Nazerabad ناظراباد
- Village
- Location within Iran
- Coordinates: 36°26′05″N 59°29′32″E
- Country: Iran
- Province: Razavi Khorasan
- County: Mashhad
- Bakhsh: Central
- Rural District: Tus

Population (2006)
  - Total: 350
- Time zone: UTC+3:30 (IRST)
  - Summer (DST): UTC+4:30 (IRDT)

Nazerabad (Persian: ناظراباد, also Romanized as Nāz̧erābād) is a village in Tus Rural District, in the Central District of Mashhad County, Razavi Khorasan Province, Iran. At the 2006 census, its population was 350, in 81 families.
