= Avazi =

Avazi عوضي
- Village
- Location within Iran
- Coordinates: 36°21′45″N 59°38′10″E
- Country: Iran
- Province: Razavi Khorasan
- County: Mashhad
- Bakhsh: Central
- Rural District: Tabadkan

Population (2006)
  - Total: 319
- Time zone: UTC+3:30 (IRST)
  - Summer (DST): UTC+4:30 (IRDT)

Avazi (Persian: عوضي, also Romanized as ‘Avaẕī) is a village in Tabadkan Rural District, in the Central District of Mashhad County, Razavi Khorasan Province, Iran. At the 2006 census, its population was 319, in 79 families.

== See also ==
- List of cities, towns and villages in Razavi Khorasan Province
