= Qaleh Now-e Faz =

Qaleh Now-e Faz قلعه نوفاز
- Village
- Country: Iran
- Province: Razavi Khorasan
- County: Mashhad
- Bakhsh: Central
- Rural District: Tabadkan

Population (2006)
  - Total: 60
- Time zone: UTC+3:30 (IRST)
  - Summer (DST): UTC+4:30 (IRDT)

Qaleh Now-e Faz (Persian: قلعه نوفاز, also Romanized as Qal‘eh Now-e Fāz) is a village in Tabadkan Rural District, in the Central District of Mashhad County, Razavi Khorasan Province, Iran. At the 2006 census, its population was 60, in 17 families.
