= Jahiz Khaneh =

Jahiz Khaneh جهيزخانه
- Village
- Location within Iran
- Coordinates: 36°29′25″N 59°40′39″E
- Country: Iran
- Province: Razavi Khorasan
- County: Mashhad
- Bakhsh: Central
- Rural District: Tabadkan

Population (2006)
  - Total: 101
- Time zone: UTC+3:30 (IRST)
  - Summer (DST): UTC+4:30 (IRDT)

Jahiz Khaneh (Persian: جهيزخانه, also Romanized as Jahīz Khāneh; also known as Qeleh Jīz Khaneh) is a village in Tabadkan Rural District, in the Central District of Mashhad County, Razavi Khorasan Province, Iran. At the 2006 census, its population was 101, in 28 families.
