= Gol Ezqand =

Gol Ezqand گل ازقند
- Village
- Location within Iran
- Coordinates: 36°35′10″N 59°36′49″E
- Country: Iran
- Province: Razavi Khorasan
- County: Mashhad
- Bakhsh: Central
- Rural District: Darzab

Population (2006)
  - Total: 115
- Time zone: UTC+3:30 (IRST)
  - Summer (DST): UTC+4:30 (IRDT)

Gol Ezqand (Persian: گل ازقند, also Romanized as Gol Azqand) is a village in Darzab Rural District, in the Central District of Mashhad County, Razavi Khorasan Province, Iran. At the 2006 census, its population was 115, in 22 families.
