= Tabadkan =

Tabadkan (Persian: تبادكان) may refer to:

- Tabadakan, a village in Razavi Khorasan Province
- Tabadkan Rural District, an administrative subdivision of Razavi Khorasan Province
