= Dezq =

Dezq (Persian: دزق) may refer to:

- Dezq, Mashhad
- Dezq, Nishapur
- Dezg (disambiguation)
