= Jaghneh Hazrati =

Jaghneh Hazrati جغنه حضرتي
- Village
- Location within Iran
- Coordinates: 36°31′33″N 59°29′37″E
- Country: Iran
- Province: Razavi Khorasan
- County: Mashhad
- Bakhsh: Central
- Rural District: Darzab

Population (2006)
  - Total: 302
- Time zone: UTC+3:30 (IRST)
  - Summer (DST): UTC+4:30 (IRDT)

Jaghneh Hazrati (Persian: جغنه حضرتي, also Romanized as Jaghneh Ḩaẕratī; also known as Jaghneh Āstāneh and Bāgheshak) is a village in Darzab Rural District, in the Central District of Mashhad County, Razavi Khorasan Province, Iran. At the 2006 census, its population was 302, in 70 families.
