= Rud-e Khin =

Rud-e Khin رودخين
- Village
- Location within Iran
- Coordinates: 36°22′33″N 59°36′48″E
- Country: Iran
- Province: Razavi Khorasan
- County: Mashhad
- Bakhsh: Central
- Rural District: Tabadkan

Population (2006)
  - Total: 54
- Time zone: UTC+3:30 (IRST)
  - Summer (DST): UTC+4:30 (IRDT)

Rud-e Khin (Persian: رودخين, also Romanized as Rūd-e Khīn) is a village in Tabadkan Rural District, in the Central District of Mashhad County, Razavi Khorasan Province, Iran. At the 2006 census, its population was 54, in 13 families.
