= Filian =

Filian may refer to:

- Filian-e Qaem Maqam
- Filian-e Sofla
- Filian (VTuber)
