= Manzelabad, Razavi Khorasan =

Village in Razavi Khorasan province, Iran

Manzelabad Persian: منزل اباد
- Village
- Location within Iran
- Coordinates: 36°24′15″N 59°27′59″E
- Country: Iran
- Province: Razavi Khorasan
- County: Mashhad
- District: Central
- Rural District: Tus

Population (2016)
  - Total: 8,520
- Time zone: UTC+3:30 (IRST)

Manzelabad (Persian: منزل اباد) (Note: Also romanized as Manzelābād) is a village in Tus Rural District of the Central District in Mashhad County, Razavi Khorasan province, Iran.

== Demographics ==
=== Population ===
At the time of the 2006 National Census, the village's population was 2,898 in 749 households. The following census in 2011 counted 6,568 people in 1,856 households. The 2016 census measured the population of the village as 8,520 people in 2,494 households.
