= Filian-e Qaem Maqam =

Filian-e Qaem Maqam فيليان قائم مقام
- Village
- Location within Iran
- Coordinates: 36°31′33″N 59°25′23″E
- Country: Iran
- Province: Razavi Khorasan
- County: Mashhad
- Bakhsh: Central
- Rural District: Miyan Velayat

Population (2006)
  - Total: 98
- Time zone: UTC+3:30 (IRST)
  - Summer (DST): UTC+4:30 (IRDT)

Filian-e Qaem Maqam (Persian: فيليان قائم مقام, also Romanized as Fīlīān-e Qā’em Maqām and Felīān-e Qa’em Maqām; also known as Felīān-e Qa’em Maqāmī and Qa’em Maqām-e ‘Olyā) is a village in Miyan Velayat Rural District, in the Central District of Mashhad County, Razavi Khorasan Province, Iran. At the 2006 census, its population was 98, in 19 families.
