= Kalateh-ye Barfi =

Village in Razavi Khorasan province, Iran

Kalateh-ye Barfi Persian: كلاته برفي
- Village
- Location within Iran
- Coordinates: 36°27′04″N 59°28′06″E
- Country: Iran
- Province: Razavi Khorasan
- County: Mashhad
- District: Central
- Rural District: Tus

Population (2016)
  - Total: 2,916
- Time zone: UTC+3:30 (IRST)

Kalateh-ye Barfi (Persian: كلاته برفي) (Note: Also romanized as Kalāteh-ye Barfī) is a village in Tus Rural District of the Central District in Mashhad County, Razavi Khorasan province, Iran.

== Demographics ==
=== Population ===
At the time of the 2006 National Census, the village's population was 1,757 in 370 households. The following census in 2011 counted 2,496 people in 631 households. The 2016 census measured the population of the village as 2,916 people in 747 households.
