= Andad =

Village in Razavi Khorasan province, Iran

Andad Persian: انداد
- Village
- Location within Iran
- Coordinates: 36°39′00″N 59°27′29″E
- Country: Iran
- Province: Razavi Khorasan
- County: Mashhad
- District: Central
- Rural District: Darzab

Population (2016)
  - Total: 577
- Time zone: UTC+3:30 (IRST)

Andad (Persian: انداد) (Note: Also romanized as Andād) is a village in Darzab Rural District of the Central District in Mashhad County, Razavi Khorasan province, Iran.

== Demographics ==
=== Population ===
At the time of the 2006 National Census, the village's population was 666 in 158 households. The following census in 2011 counted 589 people in 184 households. The 2016 census measured the population of the village as 577 people in 165 households.
