= Kola Kub =

Village in Razavi Khorasan province, Iran

Kola Kub Persian: كلاكوب
- Village
- Location within Iran
- Coordinates: 36°26′01″N 59°37′37″E
- Country: Iran
- Province: Razavi Khorasan
- County: Mashhad
- District: Central
- Rural District: Tabadkan

Population (2016)
  - Total: 1,272
- Time zone: UTC+3:30 (IRST)

Kola Kub (Persian: كلاكوب) (Note: Also romanized as Kolā Kūb; also known as Kalakāb and Kālākūb) is a village in Tabadkan Rural District of the Central District in Mashhad County, Razavi Khorasan province, Iran.

== Demographics ==
=== Population ===
At the time of the 2006 National Census, the village's population was 843 in 215 households. The following census in 2011 counted 861 people in 267 households. The 2016 census measured the population of the village as 1,272 people in 399 households.
