= Kashaf =

Village in Razavi Khorasan province, Iran

Kashaf Persian: كشف
- Village
- Location within Iran
- Coordinates: 36°22′04″N 59°34′36″E
- Country: Iran
- Province: Razavi Khorasan
- County: Mashhad
- District: Central
- Rural District: Tus

Population (2016)
  - Total: 11,459
- Time zone: UTC+3:30 (IRST)

Kashaf (Persian: كشف) is a village in Tus Rural District of the Central District in Mashhad County, Razavi Khorasan province, Iran.

== Demographics ==
=== Population ===
At the time of the 2006 National Census, the village's population was 2,033 in 532 households. The following census in 2011 counted 6,199 people in 1,780 households. The 2016 census measured the population of the village as 11,459 people in 3,330 households, the most populous in its rural district.
