= Mareshk =

Village in Razavi Khorasan province, Iran

Mareshk Persian: مارشك
- Village
- Location within Iran
- Coordinates: 36°48′48″N 59°32′56″E
- Country: Iran
- Province: Razavi Khorasan
- County: Mashhad
- District: Central
- Rural District: Kardeh

Population (2016)
  - Total: 932
- Time zone: UTC+3:30 (IRST)

Mareshk (Persian: مارشك) (Note: Also romanized as Māreshk and Marshak; also known as Marūshk) is a village in, and the former capital of, Kardeh Rural District in the Central District of Mashhad County, Razavi Khorasan province, Iran. The capital of the rural district has been transferred to the village of Kardeh.

== Demographics ==
=== Population ===
At the time of the 2006 National Census, the village's population was 1,532 in 334 households. The following census in 2011 counted 1,216 people in 314 households. The 2016 census measured the population of the village as 932 people in 310 households, the most populous in its rural district.
