= Qaleh Now-e Valiabad =

Village in Razavi Khorasan province, Iran

Qaleh Now-e Valiabad Persian: قلعه نوولي اباد
- Village
- Location within Iran
- Coordinates: 36°35′20″N 59°29′08″E
- Country: Iran
- Province: Razavi Khorasan
- County: Mashhad
- District: Central
- Rural District: Darzab

Population (2016)
  - Total: 627
- Time zone: UTC+3:30 (IRST)

Qaleh Now-e Valiabad (Persian: قلعه نوولي اباد) (Note: Also romanized as Qal‘eh Now-e Valīābād; also known as Qal‘eh Now) is a village in Darzab Rural District of the Central District in Mashhad County, Razavi Khorasan province, Iran.

== Demographics ==
=== Population ===
At the time of the 2006 National Census, the village's population was 609 in 154 households. The following census in 2011 counted 450 people in 135 households. The 2016 census measured the population of the village as 627 people in 205 households.
