= Bolghur =

Village in Razavi Khorasan province, Iran

Bolghur Persian: تلغور
- Village
- Location within Iran
- Coordinates: 36°50′49″N 59°36′05″E
- Country: Iran
- Province: Razavi Khorasan
- County: Mashhad
- District: Central
- Rural District: Kardeh

Population (2016)
  - Total: 705
- Time zone: UTC+3:30 (IRST)

Bolghur (Persian: بلغور) (Note: Also romanized as Balghoor, Balghūr, and Bolghūr; also known as Bolqūr) is a village in Kardeh Rural District of the Central District in Mashhad County, Razavi Khorasan province, Iran.

== Demographics ==
=== Population ===
At the time of the 2006 National Census, the village's population was 1,370 in 308 households. The following census in 2011 counted 952 people in 291 households. The 2016 census measured the population of the village as 705 people in 234 households.
