= Deheshk =

Deheshk or Dehishk (Persian: دهشك) may refer to:

- Deheshk, Razavi Khorasan
- Deheshk, South Khorasan
