= Khvajeh Hoseynabad =

Village in Razavi Khorasan province, Iran

Khvajeh Hoseynabad Persian: خواجه حسين اباد
- Village
- Location within Iran
- Coordinates: 36°38′07″N 59°42′20″E
- Country: Iran
- Province: Razavi Khorasan
- County: Mashhad
- District: Central
- Rural District: Kardeh

Population (2016)
  - Total: 672
- Time zone: UTC+3:30 (IRST)

Khvajeh Hoseynabad (Persian: خواجه حسين اباد) (Note: Also romanized as Khājeh Hoseyn Ābād and Khvājeh Ḩoseynābād) is a village in Kardeh Rural District of the Central District in Mashhad County, Razavi Khorasan province, Iran.

== Demographics ==
=== Population ===
At the time of the 2006 National Census, the village's population was 171 in 45 households. The following census in 2011 counted 808 people in 69 households. The 2016 census measured the population of the village as 672 people in 61 households.
