= Hemmatabad, Tabadkan =

Village in Razavi Khorasan province, Iran

Hemmatabad Persian: همت اباد
- Village
- Location within Iran
- Coordinates: 36°21′16″N 59°39′34″E
- Country: Iran
- Province: Razavi Khorasan
- County: Mashhad
- District: Central
- Rural District: Tabadkan

Population (2016)
  - Total: 1,621
- Time zone: UTC+3:30 (IRST)

Hemmatabad (Persian: همت اباد) (Note: Also romanized as Hemmatābād) is a village in Tabadkan Rural District of the Central District in Mashhad County, Razavi Khorasan province, Iran.

== Demographics ==
=== Population ===
At the time of the 2006 National Census, the village's population was 1,903 in 473 households. The following census in 2011 counted 2,500 people in 678 households. The 2016 census measured the population of the village as 1,621 people in 477 households.
