= Mordar Keshan =

Village in Razavi Khorasan province, Iran

Mordar Keshan Persian: مردار كشان
- Village
- Location within Iran
- Coordinates: 36°27′41″N 59°30′25″E
- Country: Iran
- Province: Razavi Khorasan
- County: Mashhad
- District: Central
- Rural District: Tus

Population (2016)
  - Total: 1,592
- Time zone: UTC+3:30 (IRST)

Mordar Keshan (Persian: مردار كشان) (Note: Also romanized as Mordār Keshān) is a village in Tus Rural District of the Central District in Mashhad County, Razavi Khorasan province, Iran.

== Demographics ==
=== Population ===
At the time of the 2006 National Census, the village's population was 1,254 in 309 households. The following census in 2011 counted 1,323 people in 395 households. The 2016 census measured the population of the village as 1,592 people in 446 households.
