= Kurdeh, Razavi Khorasan =

Village in Razavi Khorasan province, Iran

Kurdeh Persian: كورده
- Village
- Location within Iran
- Coordinates: 36°30′59″N 59°20′11″E
- Country: Iran
- Province: Razavi Khorasan
- County: Mashhad
- District: Central
- Rural District: Miyan Velayat

Population (2016)
  - Total: 3,820
- Time zone: UTC+3:30 (IRST)

Kurdeh (Persian: كورده) (Note: Also romanized as Kavardeh and Kūrdeh) is a village in Miyan Velayat Rural District of the Central District in Mashhad County, Razavi Khorasan province, Iran.

== Demographics ==
=== Population ===
At the time of the 2006 National Census, the village's population was 1,727 in 405 households. The following census in 2011 counted 1,819 people in 479 households. The 2016 census measured the population of the village as 3,820 people in 842 households.
