= Shahid Hashemi Nezhad =

Village in Razavi Khorasan province, Iran

Shahid Hashemi Nezhad Persian: شهيدهاشمي نژاد
- Village
- Location within Iran
- Coordinates: 36°28′14″N 59°30′01″E
- Country: Iran
- Province: Razavi Khorasan
- County: Mashhad
- District: Central
- Rural District: Tus

Population (2016)
  - Total: 2,692
- Time zone: UTC+3:30 (IRST)

Shahid Hashemi Nezhad (Persian: شهيدهاشمي نژاد) (Note: Also romanized as Shahīd Hāshemī Nezhād; also known as Shahid Hashemi Nizhad and Shahīd Hāshemī Nizhād) is a village in Tus Rural District of the Central District in Mashhad County, Razavi Khorasan province, Iran.

== Demographics ==
=== Population ===
At the time of the 2006 National Census, the village's population was 1,697 in 411 households. The following census in 2011 counted 2,483 people in 670 households. The 2016 census measured the population of the village as 2,692 people in 733 households.
