= Govareshk =

Village in Razavi Khorasan province, Iran

Govareshk Persian: گوارشك
- Village
- Location within Iran
- Coordinates: 36°34′19″N 59°30′13″E
- Country: Iran
- Province: Razavi Khorasan
- County: Mashhad
- District: Central
- Rural District: Darzab

Population (2016)
  - Total: 1,043
- Time zone: UTC+3:30 (IRST)

Govareshk (Persian: گوارشك) (Note: Also romanized as Gavāreshk and Govāreshk; also known as Gavāreshg and Gavārishk) is a village in, and the capital of, Darzab Rural District in the Central District of Mashhad County, Razavi Khorasan province, Iran.

== Demographics ==
=== Population ===
At the time of the 2006 National Census, the village's population was 910 in 265 households. The following census in 2011 counted 905 people in 266 households. The 2016 census measured the population of the village as 1,043 people in 316 households.
