= Kushk-e Mehdi =

Village in Razavi Khorasan province, Iran

Kushk-e Mehdi Persian: كوشك مهدي
- Village
- Location within Iran
- Coordinates: 36°23′24″N 59°33′53″E
- Country: Iran
- Province: Razavi Khorasan
- County: Mashhad
- District: Central
- Rural District: Tus

Population (2016)
  - Total: 4,807
- Time zone: UTC+3:30 (IRST)

Kushk-e Mehdi (Persian: كوشك مهدي) (Note: Also romanized as Kūshk-e Mehdī; also known as Kūtoshk-e Mehdī) is a village in Tus Rural District of the Central District in Mashhad County, Razavi Khorasan province, Iran.

== Demographics ==
=== Population ===
At the time of the 2006 National Census, the village's population was 3,118 in 729 households. The following census in 2011 counted 3,673 people in 1,010 households. The 2016 census measured the population of the village as 4,807 people in 1,383 households.
