= Karimabad, Kenevist =

Village in Razavi Khorasan province, Iran

Karimabad Persian: كريم اباد
- Village
- Location within Iran
- Coordinates: 36°17′08″N 59°41′41″E
- Country: Iran
- Province: Razavi Khorasan
- County: Mashhad
- District: Central
- Rural District: Kenevist

Population (2016)
  - Total: 1,488
- Time zone: UTC+3:30 (IRST)

Karimabad (Persian: كريم اباد) (Note: Also romanized as Karīmābād) is a village in Kenevist Rural District of the Central District in Mashhad County, Razavi Khorasan province, Iran.

== Demographics ==
=== Population ===
At the time of the 2006 National Census, the village's population was 536 in 140 households. The following census in 2011 counted 680 people in 202 households. The 2016 census measured the population of the village as 1,488 people in 422 households.
