= Rezavieh =

Village in Razavi Khorasan province, Iran

Rezavieh Persian: رضويه
- Village
- Location within Iran
- Coordinates: 36°29′00″N 59°24′40″E
- Country: Iran
- Province: Razavi Khorasan
- County: Mashhad
- District: Central
- Rural District: Miyan Velayat

Population (2016)
  - Total: 1,066
- Time zone: UTC+3:30 (IRST)

Rezavieh (Persian: رضويه) (Note: Also romanized as Rez̤avīeh; also known as Qal‘eh Sīāh (قلعه سياه)) is a village in Miyan Velayat Rural District of the Central District in Mashhad County, Razavi Khorasan province, Iran.

== Demographics ==
=== Population ===
At the time of the 2006 National Census, the village's population was 596 in 132 households. The following census in 2011 counted 838 people in 210 households. The 2016 census measured the population of the village as 1,066 people in 285 households.
