= Filian-e Sofla =

Filian-e Sofla فيليان سفلي
- Village
- Location within Iran
- Coordinates: 36°31′37″N 59°25′39″E
- Country: Iran
- Province: Razavi Khorasan
- County: Mashhad
- Bakhsh: Central
- Rural District: Miyan Velayat

Population (2006)
  - Total: 131
- Time zone: UTC+3:30 (IRST)
  - Summer (DST): UTC+4:30 (IRDT)

Filian-e Sofla (Persian: فيليان سفلي, also Romanized as Fīlīān-e Soflá; also known as Fīlīān-e Pā’īn) is a village in Miyan Velayat Rural District, in the Central District of Mashhad County, Razavi Khorasan Province, Iran. At the 2006 census, its population was 131, in 27 families.
