= Gurgi (disambiguation) =

Gurgi is a fictional character in The Chronicles of Prydain series of fantasy novels.

Gurgi may also refer to:

- Gwrgi, brother of Peredur, a figure of medieval British legend
- Gurgi, a local name for the fern Pteridium esculentum

== See also ==
- Gurgi Mosque, in Tripoli, Libya
- Gurgy, a commune in France
- Gwrgi (disambiguation)
- Gorgi (disambiguation)
