= Amarghan-e Sofla =

Village in Razavi Khorasan province, Iran

Amarghan-e Sofla Persian: امرغان سفلي
- Village
- Location within Iran
- Coordinates: 36°20′36″N 59°45′50″E
- Country: Iran
- Province: Razavi Khorasan
- County: Mashhad
- District: Central
- Rural District: Kenevist

Population (2016)
  - Total: 1,593
- Time zone: UTC+3:30 (IRST)

Amarghan-e Sofla (Persian: امرغان سفلي) (Note: Also romanized as Amarghān-e Soflá; also known as Amarghān (امرغان), Amarghūn, ‘Amarqān, and Emerghān) is a village in Kenevist Rural District of the Central District in Mashhad County, Razavi Khorasan province, Iran.

== Demographics ==
=== Population ===
At the time of the 2006 National Census, the village's population was 1,440 in 343 households. The following census in 2011 counted 1,624 people in 454 households. The 2016 census measured the population of the village as 1,593 people in 472 households.
