= Darabad-e Shahzadeh =

Village in Razavi Khorasan province, Iran

Darabad-e Shahzadeh Persian: درابدشاهزاده
- Village
- Location within Iran
- Country: Iran
- Province: Razavi Khorasan
- County: Mashhad
- District: Central
- Rural District: Tabadkan

Population (2016)
  - Total: 1,932
- Time zone: UTC+3:30 (IRST)

Darabad-e Shahzadeh (Persian: درآبد شاهزاده) (Note: Also romanized as Darābād-e Shāhzadeh; also known as Darābād-e Emām (درابدامام) and Darbābād-e Shāzdeh) is a village in Tabadkan Rural District of the Central District in Mashhad County, Razavi Khorasan province, Iran.

== Demographics ==
=== Population ===
At the time of the 2006 National Census, the village's population was 1,631 in 430 households. The following census in 2011 counted 1,759 people in 508 households. The 2016 census measured the population of the village as 1,932 people in 560 households.
