= Farkhad, Iran =

Village in Razavi Khorasan province, Iran

Farkhad Persian: فرخد
- Village
- Location within Iran
- Coordinates: 36°25′44″N 59°38′53″E
- Country: Iran
- Province: Razavi Khorasan
- County: Mashhad
- District: Central
- Rural District: Tabadkan

Population (2016)
  - Total: 3,977
- Time zone: UTC+3:30 (IRST)

Farkhad (Persian: فرخد) (Note: Also romanized as Farokhad, Farokhod, and Farrokhad; also known as Farrokhdeh) is a village in Tabadkan Rural District of the Central District in Mashhad County, Razavi Khorasan province, Iran.

== Demographics ==
=== Population ===
At the time of the 2006 National Census, the village's population was 3,322 in 784 households. The following census in 2011 counted 3,901 people in 1,101 households. The 2016 census measured the population of the village as 3,977 people in 1,203 households.
