= Asgariyeh =

Village in Razavi Khorasan province, Iran

Asgariyeh Persian: عسگريه
- Village
- Location within Iran
- Coordinates: 36°29′54″N 59°22′50″E
- Country: Iran
- Province: Razavi Khorasan
- County: Mashhad
- District: Central
- Rural District: Miyan Velayat

Population (2016)
  - Total: 1,584
- Time zone: UTC+3:30 (IRST)

Asgariyeh (Persian: عسگريه) (Note: Also romanized as ‘Asgarīyeh) is a village in, and the capital of, Miyan Velayat Rural District in the Central District of Mashhad County, Razavi Khorasan province, Iran.

== Demographics ==
=== Population ===
At the time of the 2006 National Census, the village's population was 1,332 in 337 households. The following census in 2011 counted 1,359 people in 411 households. The 2016 census measured the population of the village as 1,584 people in 398 households.
