= Joghri =

Village in Razavi Khorasan province, Iran

Joghri Persian: جغري
- Village
- Location within Iran
- Coordinates: 36°29′43″N 59°52′17″E
- Country: Iran
- Province: Razavi Khorasan
- County: Mashhad
- District: Central
- Rural District: Kenevist

Population (2016)
  - Total: 1,369
- Time zone: UTC+3:30 (IRST)

Joghri (Persian: جغري) (Note: Also romanized as Joghrī; also known as Joghar) is a village in Kenevist Rural District of the Central District in Mashhad County, Razavi Khorasan province, Iran.

== Demographics ==
=== Population ===
At the time of the 2006 National Census, the village's population was 1,482 in 382 households. The following census in 2011 counted 1,284 people in 384 households. The 2016 census measured the population of the village as 1,369 people in 408 households.
