= Kazemabad, Mashhad =

Village in Razavi Khorasan province, Iran

Kazemabad Persian: كاظم اباد
- Village
- Location within Iran
- Coordinates: 36°25′49″N 59°28′30″E
- Country: Iran
- Province: Razavi Khorasan
- County: Mashhad
- District: Central
- Rural District: Tus

Population (2016)
  - Total: 1,501
- Time zone: UTC+3:30 (IRST)

Kazemabad (Persian: كاظم اباد) (Note: Also romanized as Kāz̧emābād; also known as Qāsemābād and Qāsimābād) is a village in, and the capital of, Tus Rural District in the Central District of Mashhad County, Razavi Khorasan province, Iran.

== Demographics ==
=== Population ===
At the time of the 2006 National Census, the village's population was 677 in 172 households. The following census in 2011 counted 993 people in 269 households. The 2016 census measured the population of the village as 1,501 people in 420 households.
