= Zak, Iran =

Village in Razavi Khorasan province, Iran

Zak Persian: زاك
- Village
- Location within Iran
- Coordinates: 36°32′27″N 59°33′25″E
- Country: Iran
- Province: Razavi Khorasan
- County: Mashhad
- District: Central
- Rural District: Darzab

Population (2016)
  - Total: 1,421
- Time zone: UTC+3:30 (IRST)

Zak (Persian: زاك) (Note: Also romanized as Zāk) is a village in Darzab Rural District of the Central District in Mashhad County, Razavi Khorasan province, Iran.

== Demographics ==
=== Population ===
At the time of the 2006 National Census, the village's population was 1,095 in 276 households. The following census in 2011 counted 1,346 people in 386 households. The 2016 census measured the population of the village as 1,421 people in 406 households, the most populous in its rural district.

== Geography ==
Zak is 6km north of Tus. The distance of this village from Mashhad is about 36km. The village has about 300 private villa gardens that are used for summer purposes.

== Economy ==
Most people are engaged in agriculture and animal husbandry, particularly wheat, barley and sugar beets.
