= Kharkat =

Village in Razavi Khorasan province, Iran

Kharkat Persian: خركت
- Village
- Location within Iran
- Coordinates: 36°53′37″N 59°32′47″E
- Country: Iran
- Province: Razavi Khorasan
- County: Mashhad
- District: Central
- Rural District: Kardeh

Population (2016)
  - Total: 466
- Time zone: UTC+3:30 (IRST)

Kharkat (Persian: خركت) (Note: Also known as Khargat) is a village in Kardeh Rural District of the Central District in Mashhad County, Razavi Khorasan province, Iran.

== Demographics ==
=== Population ===
At the time of the 2006 National Census, the village's population was 641 in 145 households. The following census in 2011 counted 455 people in 129 households. The 2016 census measured the population of the village as 466 people in 131 households.
