= Khvor-e Vosta =

Khvor-e Vosta خوروسطي
- Village
- Location within Iran
- Coordinates: 36°40′50″N 59°51′37″E
- Country: Iran
- Province: Razavi Khorasan
- County: Mashhad
- Bakhsh: Central
- Rural District: Tabadkan

Population (2006)
  - Total: 93
- Time zone: UTC+3:30 (IRST)
  - Summer (DST): UTC+4:30 (IRDT)

Khvor-e Vosta (Persian: خوروسطي, also Romanized as Khvor-e Vosţá and Khūr-e Vosţá; also known as Khowr-e Meyānī, Khaur, Khowr, Khūr, and Khūr-e Vasaţī) is a village in Tabadkan Rural District, in the Central District of Mashhad County, Razavi Khorasan Province, Iran. At the 2006 census, its population was 93, in 21 families.
