= Kanavis =

Kanavis may refer to:

- Kanavis McGhee (b. 1968), American football player
- Kanavis, Iran, a village in Razavi Khorasan Province
