= Khin-e Chomaqi =

Khin-e Chomaqi خين چماقي
- Village
- Location within Iran
- Coordinates: 36°25′39″N 59°31′48″E
- Country: Iran
- Province: Razavi Khorasan
- County: Mashhad
- Bakhsh: Central
- Rural District: Tus

Population (2006)
  - Total: 275
- Time zone: UTC+3:30 (IRST)
  - Summer (DST): UTC+4:30 (IRDT)

Khin-e Chomaqi (Persian: خين چماقي, also Romanized as Khīn-e Chomāqī and Kheyn-e Chomāqī) is a village in Tus Rural District, in the Central District of Mashhad County, Razavi Khorasan Province, Iran. At the 2006 census, its population was 275, in 71 families.
