= Eslamabad-e Chahar Gavareh =

Village in Razavi Khorasan province, Iran

Eslamabad-e Chahar Gavareh Persian: اسلام ابادچهارگواره
- Village
- Country: Iran
- Province: Razavi Khorasan
- County: Mashhad
- District: Central
- Rural District: Tabadkan

Population (2016)
  - Total: 1,870
- Time zone: UTC+3:30 (IRST)

Eslamabad-e Chahar Gavareh (Persian: اسلام ابادچهارگواره) (Note: Also romanized as Eslāmābād-e Chahār Gavāreh; also known as Eslāmābād ( اسلام اباد)) is a village in Tabadkan Rural District of the Central District in Mashhad County, Razavi Khorasan province, Iran.

== Demographics ==
=== Population ===
At the time of the 2006 National Census, the village's population was 573 in 149 households. The following census in 2011 counted 927 people in 277 households. The 2016 census measured the population of the village as 1,870 people in 541 households.
