= Hendelabad =

Village in Razavi Khorasan province, Iran

Hendelabad Persian: همدل‌آباد
- Village
- Location within Iran
- Coordinates: 36°25′34″N 60°00′02″E
- Country: Iran
- Province: Razavi Khorasan
- County: Mashhad
- District: Central
- Rural District: Kenevist

Population (2016)
  - Total: 1,447
- Time zone: UTC+3:30 (IRST)

Hendelabad (Persian: هندل اباد) (Note: Also romanized as Hendelābād; also known as Hamādīlābād and Handīlābād) is a village in Kenevist Rural District of the Central District in Mashhad County, Razavi Khorasan province, Iran.

== Demographics ==
=== Population ===
At the time of the 2006 National Census, the village's population was 1,294 in 331 households. The following census in 2011 counted 715 people in 203 households. The 2016 census measured the population of the village as 1,447 people in 455 households.
