= Sisabad =

Neighborhood in Razavi Khorasan province, Iran

Sisabad Persian: سيس اباد
- Neighborhood
- Location within Iran
- Coordinates: 36°20′17″N 59°39′22″E
- Country: Iran
- Province: Razavi Khorasan
- County: Mashhad
- District: Central
- City: Mashhad

Population (2006)
  - Total: 7,648
- Time zone: UTC+3:30 (IRST)

Sisabad (Persian: سيس اباد) (Note: Also romanized as Sīsābād) is a neighborhood in the city of Mashhad in the Central District of Mashhad County, Razavi Khorasan province, Iran.

== Demographics ==
=== Population ===
At the time of the 2006 National Census, Sisabad's population was 7,648 in 1,938 households, when it was a village in Tabadkan Rural District. After the census, the village was annexed by the city of Mashhad.
