= Dar Biaban =

Village in Razavi Khorasan province, Iran

Dar Biaban Persian: دربيابان
- Village
- Location within Iran
- Coordinates: 36°49′28″N 59°27′17″E
- Country: Iran
- Province: Razavi Khorasan
- County: Mashhad
- District: Central
- Rural District: Kardeh

Population (2016)
  - Total: 260
- Time zone: UTC+3:30 (IRST)

Dar Biaban (Persian: دربيابان) (Note: Also romanized as Dar Beyābān and Dar Bīābān) is a village in Kardeh Rural District of the Central District in Mashhad County, Razavi Khorasan province, Iran.

== Demographics ==
=== Population ===
At the time of the 2006 National Census, the village's population was 203 in 51 households. The following census in 2011 counted 30 people in 10 households. The 2016 census measured the population of the village as 260 people in 79 households.
