= Akbarabad, Tus =

Village in Razavi Khorasan province, Iran

Akbarabad Persian: اكبراباد
- Village
- Location within Iran
- Coordinates: 36°26′02″N 59°27′36″E
- Country: Iran
- Province: Razavi Khorasan
- County: Mashhad
- District: Central
- Rural District: Tus

Population (2016)
  - Total: 1,975
- Time zone: UTC+3:30 (IRST)

Akbarabad (Persian: اكبراباد) (Note: Also romanized as Akbarābād) is a village in Tus Rural District of the Central District in Mashhad County, Razavi Khorasan province, Iran.

== Demographics ==
=== Population ===
At the time of the 2006 National Census, the village's population was 1,753 in 440 households. The following census in 2011 counted 2,345 people in 655 households. The 2016 census measured the population of the village as 1,975 people in 574 households.
