= Chehel Hojreh =

Village in Razavi Khorasan province, Iran

Chehel Hojreh Persian: چهل حجره
- Village
- Location within Iran
- Coordinates: 36°24′16″N 59°30′40″E
- Country: Iran
- Province: Razavi Khorasan
- County: Mashhad
- District: Central
- Rural District: Tus

Population (2016)
  - Total: 4,399
- Time zone: UTC+3:30 (IRST)

Chehel Hojreh (Persian: چهل حجره) (Note: Also romanized as Chehel Ḩojreh) is a village in Tus Rural District of the Central District in Mashhad County, Razavi Khorasan province, Iran.

== Demographics ==
=== Population ===
At the time of the 2006 National Census, the village's population was 3,028 in 736 households. The following census in 2011 counted 3,720 people in 1,000 households. The 2016 census measured the population of the village as 4,399 people in 1,238 households.
