= Tus-e Olya =

Tus-e Olya طوس عليا
- Village
- Location within Iran
- Coordinates: 36°29′15″N 59°30′55″E
- Country: Iran
- Province: Razavi Khorasan
- County: Mashhad
- Bakhsh: Central
- Rural District: Tus

Population (2006)
  - Total: 460
- Time zone: UTC+3:30 (IRST)
  - Summer (DST): UTC+4:30 (IRDT)

Tus-e Olya (Persian: طوس عليا, also Romanized as Ţūs-e ‘Olyā; also known as Shahr-e Ţūs-e Bālā, Shahr-e Ţūs, and Shahr-e Tūs-e Bālāo) is a village in Tus Rural District, in the Central District of Mashhad County, Razavi Khorasan Province, Iran. At the 2006 census, its population was 460, in 121 families.
