= Kushkabad, Razavi Khorasan =

Village in Razavi Khorasan province, Iran

Kushkabad Persian: كوشك اباد
- Village
- Location within Iran
- Coordinates: 36°40′36″N 59°37′40″E
- Country: Iran
- Province: Razavi Khorasan
- County: Mashhad
- District: Central
- Rural District: Kardeh

Population (2016)
  - Total: 250
- Time zone: UTC+3:30 (IRST)

Kushkabad (Persian: كوشك اباد) (Note: Also romanized as Kūshkābād; also known as Gūshkābād) is a village in Kardeh Rural District of the Central District in Mashhad County, Razavi Khorasan province, Iran.

== Demographics ==
=== Population ===
At the time of the 2006 National Census, the village's population was 331 in 90 households. The following census in 2011 counted 274 people in 91 households. The 2016 census measured the population of the village as 250 people in 91 households.
