= Borzeshabad =

Village in Razavi Khorasan province, Iran

Borzeshabad Persian: برزش اباد
- Village
- Location within Iran
- Coordinates: 36°22′12″N 59°46′05″E
- Country: Iran
- Province: Razavi Khorasan
- County: Mashhad
- District: Central
- Rural District: Kenevist

Population (2016)
  - Total: 1,288
- Time zone: UTC+3:30 (IRST)

Borzeshabad (Persian: برزش اباد) (Note: Also romanized as Borzeshābād; also known as Bīdeshābād) is a village in Kenevist Rural District of the Central District in Mashhad County, Razavi Khorasan province, Iran.

== Demographics ==
=== Population ===
At the time of the 2006 National Census, the village's population was 847 in 222 households. The following census in 2011 counted 1,100 people in 331 households. The 2016 census measured the population of the village as 1,288 people in 398 households.
