= Dustabad, Mashhad =

Village in Razavi Khorasan province, Iran

Dustabad Persian: دوست اباد
- Village
- Location within Iran
- Coordinates: 36°24′58″N 59°29′23″E
- Country: Iran
- Province: Razavi Khorasan
- County: Mashhad
- District: Central
- Rural District: Tus

Population (2016)
  - Total: 8,969
- Time zone: UTC+3:30 (IRST)

Dustabad (Persian: دوست اباد) (Note: Also romanized as Dūstābād) is a village in Tus Rural District of the Central District in Mashhad County, Razavi Khorasan province, Iran.

== Demographics ==
=== Population ===
At the time of the 2006 National Census, the village's population was 5,631 in 1,435 households. The following census in 2011 counted 8,145 people in 2,262 households. The 2016 census measured the population of the village as 8,969 people in 2,576 households.
