= Khoor-e Olya =

Khoor-e Olya خورعليا
- Village
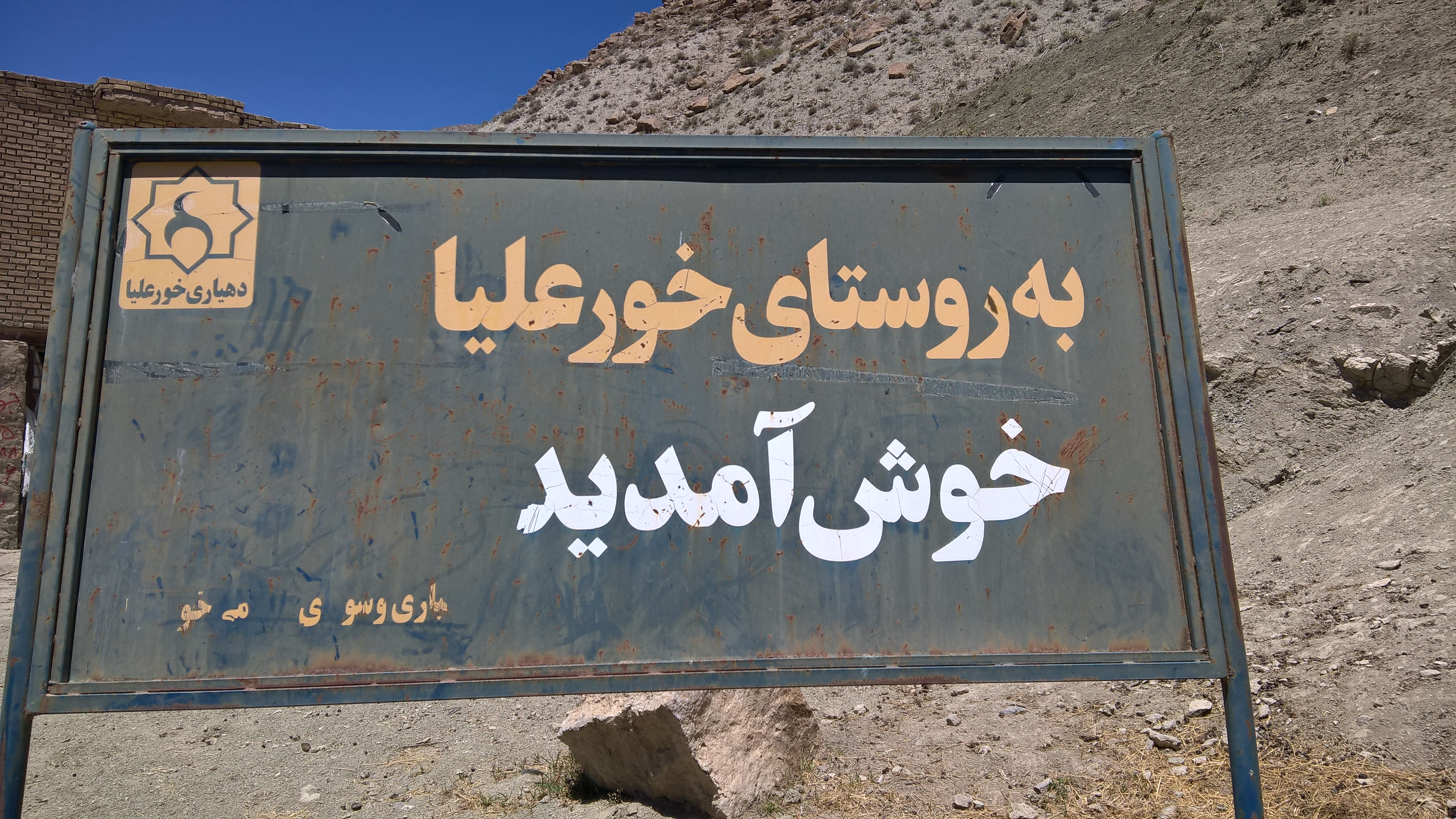

- Location within Iran
- Coordinates: 36°41′23″N 59°51′13″E
- Country: Iran
- Province: Razavi Khorasan
- County: Mashhad
- Bakhsh: Central
- Rural District: Tabadkan

Population (2006)
  - Total: 1,180
- Time zone: UTC+3:30 (IRST)
  - Summer (DST): UTC+4:30 (IRDT)

Khoor-e Olya (Persian: خورعليا, also Romanized as Khoor-e ‘Olyā; also known as Khoor-e Bālā and Khowr-e Bālā) is a village in Tabadkan Rural District, in the Central District of Mashhad County, Razavi Khorasan Province, Iran. At the 2006 census, its population was 1,180, in 288 families.
