= Shaye, Iran =

Village in Razavi Khorasan province, Iran

Shaye Persian: شايع
- Village
- Location within Iran
- Coordinates: 36°23′03″N 59°38′38″E
- Country: Iran
- Province: Razavi Khorasan
- County: Mashhad
- District: Central
- Rural District: Tabadkan

Population (2016)
  - Total: 1,171
- Time zone: UTC+3:30 (IRST)

Shaye (Persian: شايع) (Note: Also romanized as Shāye‘; also known as Shāyeh (شايه)) is a village in Tabadkan Rural District of the Central District in Mashhad County, Razavi Khorasan province, Iran.

== Demographics ==
=== Population ===
At the time of the 2006 National Census, the village's population was 577 in 158 households. The following census in 2011 counted 760 people in 233 households. The 2016 census measured the population of the village as 1,171 people in 342 households.
