= Khoor-e Sofla =

khoor-e Sofla خورسفلي
- Village
- Country: Iran
- Province: Razavi Khorasan
- County: Mashhad
- Bakhsh: Central
- Rural District: Tabadkan

Population (2006)
  - Total: 770
- Time zone: UTC+3:30 (IRST)
  - Summer (DST): UTC+4:30 (IRDT)

Khoor-e Sofla (Persian: خورسفلي, also Romanized as Khoor-e Soflá) is a village in Tabadkan Rural District, in the Central District of Mashhad County, Razavi Khorasan Province, Iran. At the 2006 census, its population was 770, in 185 families.
