= Deh Mozaffar =

Deh Mozaffar ده مظفر
- Village
- Location within Iran
- Coordinates: 36°20′24″N 59°41′06″E
- Country: Iran
- Province: Razavi Khorasan
- County: Mashhad
- Bakhsh: Central
- Rural District: Tabadkan

Population (2006)
  - Total: 13
- Time zone: UTC+3:30 (IRST)
  - Summer (DST): UTC+4:30 (IRDT)

Deh Mozaffar (Persian: ده مظفر, also Romanized as Deh Moz̧affar; also known as Moz̧affar) is a village in Tabadkan Rural District, in the Central District of Mashhad County, Razavi Khorasan Province, Iran. At the 2006 census, its population was 13, in 4 families.
