= Khour =

Khour may refer to:

- Khour, India
- Khur, Iran (disambiguation)
