= Seydabad, Tus =

Village in Razavi Khorasan province, Iran

Seydabad Persian: صيداباد
- Village
- Location within Iran
- Coordinates: 36°24′37″N 59°31′19″E
- Country: Iran
- Province: Razavi Khorasan
- County: Mashhad
- District: Central
- Rural District: Tus

Population (2016)
  - Total: 2,033
- Time zone: UTC+3:30 (IRST)

Seydabad (Persian: صيداباد) (Note: Also romanized as Şeydābād) is a village in Tus Rural District of the Central District in Mashhad County, Razavi Khorasan province, Iran.

== Demographics ==
=== Population ===
At the time of the 2006 National Census, the village's population was 905 in 229 households. The following census in 2011 counted 1,346 people in 368 households. The 2016 census measured the population of the village as 2,033 people in 552 households.
