= Nazeriyeh =

Village in Razavi Khorasan province, Iran

Nazeriyeh Persian: ناظريه
- Village
- Location within Iran
- Coordinates: 36°28′23″N 59°23′16″E
- Country: Iran
- Province: Razavi Khorasan
- County: Mashhad
- District: Central
- Rural District: Miyan Velayat

Population (2016)
  - Total: 2,827
- Time zone: UTC+3:30 (IRST)

Nazeriyeh (Persian: ناظريه) (Note: Also romanized as Nāz̧erīyeh) is a village in Miyan Velayat Rural District of the Central District in Mashhad County, Razavi Khorasan province, Iran.

== Demographics ==
=== Population ===
At the time of the 2006 National Census, the village's population was 1,900 in 418 households. The following census in 2011 counted 2,152 people in 562 households. The 2016 census measured the population of the village as 2,827 people in 758 households.
