= Kazemabad-e Panjshanbeh =

Village in Razavi Khorasan province, Iran

Kazemabad-e Panjshanbeh Persian: كاظم ابادپنجشنبه
- Village
- Location within Iran
- Coordinates: 36°22′6″N 59°38′08″E
- Country: Iran
- Province: Razavi Khorasan
- County: Mashhad
- District: Central
- Rural District: Tabadkan

Population (2016)
  - Total: 3,102
- Time zone: UTC+3:30 (IRST)

Kazemabad-e Panjshanbeh (Persian: كاظم ابادپنجشنبه) (Note: Also romanized as Kāz̧emābād-e Panj Shanbeh and Kāz̧emābād-e Panjshanbeh; also known as Kāz̧emābād (كاظم اباد)) is a village in Tabadkan Rural District of the Central District in Mashhad County, Razavi Khorasan province, Iran.

== Demographics ==
=== Population ===
At the time of the 2006 National Census, the village's population was 1,081 in 260 households. The following census in 2011 counted 2,651 people in 728 households. The 2016 census measured the population of the village as 3,102 people in 874 households.
