= Chahar Borj, Mashhad =

Village in Razavi Khorasan province, Iran

Chahar Borj Persian: چهاربرج
- Village
- Location within Iran
- Coordinates: 36°27′34″N 59°29′09″E
- Country: Iran
- Province: Razavi Khorasan
- County: Mashhad
- District: Central
- Rural District: Tus

Population (2016)
  - Total: 4,524
- Time zone: UTC+3:30 (IRST)

Chahar Borj (Persian: چهاربرج) (Note: Also romanized as Chahār Borj) is a village in Tus Rural District of the Central District in Mashhad County, Razavi Khorasan province, Iran.

== Demographics ==
=== Population ===
At the time of the 2006 National Census, the village's population was 2,053 in 534 households. The following census in 2011 counted 3,457 people in 1,012 households. The 2016 census measured the population of the village as 4,524 people in 1,307 households.
