= Shotorak, Razavi Khorasan =

Village in Razavi Khorasan province, Iran

Shotorak Persian: شترك
- Village
- Location within Iran
- Coordinates: 36°19′11″N 59°43′25″E
- Country: Iran
- Province: Razavi Khorasan
- County: Mashhad
- District: Central
- Rural District: Kenevist

Population (2016)
  - Total: 3,315
- Time zone: UTC+3:30 (IRST)

Shotorak (Persian: شترك) is a village in Kenevist Rural District of the Central District in Mashhad County, Razavi Khorasan province, Iran.

== Demographics ==
=== Population ===
At the time of the 2006 National Census, the village's population was 1,219 in 303 households. The following census in 2011 counted 1,967 people in 559 households. The 2016 census measured the population of the village as 3,315 people in 930 households.
