= Saghravan =

Village in Razavi Khorasan province, Iran

Saghravan Persian: ساغروان
- Village
- Location within Iran
- Coordinates: 36°31′13″N 59°19′48″E
- Country: Iran
- Province: Razavi Khorasan
- County: Mashhad
- District: Central
- Rural District: Miyan Velayat

Population (2016)
  - Total: 4,455
- Time zone: UTC+3:30 (IRST)

Saghravan (Persian: ساغروان) (Note: Also romanized as Sāghravān and Sāghravan; also known as Qarvān and Sāqravān) is a village in Miyan Velayat Rural District of the Central District in Mashhad County, Razavi Khorasan province, Iran.

== Demographics ==
=== Population ===
At the time of the 2006 National Census, the village's population was 2,312 in 519 households. The following census in 2011 counted 3,565 people in 918 households. The 2016 census measured the population of the village as 4,455 people in 1,175 households, the most populous in its rural district.
