= Bahar, Mashhad =

Village in Razavi Khorasan province, Iran

Bahar Persian: بهار
- Village
- Location within Iran
- Coordinates: 36°24′16″N 59°36′31″E
- Country: Iran
- Province: Razavi Khorasan
- County: Mashhad
- District: Central
- Rural District: Tabadkan

Population (2016)
  - Total: 1,218
- Time zone: UTC+3:30 (IRST)

Bahar (Persian: بهار) (Note: Also romanized as Bahār) is a village in Tabadkan Rural District of the Central District in Mashhad County, Razavi Khorasan province, Iran.

== Demographics ==
=== Population ===
At the time of the 2006 National Census, the village's population was 486 in 121 households. The following census in 2011 counted 810 people in 223 households. The 2016 census measured the population of the village as 1,218 people in 340 households.
