= Kajvan =

Kajvan (Persian: كجوان) may refer to:

- Kajvan, East Azerbaijan
- Kajvan, Razavi Khorasan
