= Khin, Iran =

Khin or Kheyn (Persian: خين) may refer to:

- Khin-e Arab
- Khin-e Chomaqi
