= Sij, Razavi Khorasan =

Village in Razavi Khorasan province, Iran

Sij Persian: سيج
- Village
- Location within Iran
- Coordinates: 36°47′05″N 59°39′09″E
- Country: Iran
- Province: Razavi Khorasan
- County: Mashhad
- District: Central
- Rural District: Kardeh

Population (2016)
  - Total: 372
- Time zone: UTC+3:30 (IRST)

Sij (Persian: سيج) (Note: Also romanized as Sīj) is a village in Kardeh Rural District of the Central District in Mashhad County, Razavi Khorasan province, Iran.

== Demographics ==
=== Population ===
At the time of the 2006 National Census, the village's population was 679 in 161 households. The following census in 2011 counted 473 people in 149 households. The 2016 census measured the population of the village as 372 people in 140 households.
