= Zirkan, Razavi Khorasan =

Village in Razavi Khorasan province, Iran

Zirkan Persian: زيركن
- Village
- Location within Iran
- Coordinates: 36°21′25″N 59°38′44″E
- Country: Iran
- Province: Razavi Khorasan
- County: Mashhad
- District: Central
- Rural District: Tabadkan

Population (2016)
  - Total: 1,107
- Time zone: UTC+3:30 (IRST)

Zirkan (Persian: زيركن) (Note: Also romanized as Zīrkan; also known as Zīrkand) is a village in Tabadkan Rural District of the Central District in Mashhad County, Razavi Khorasan province, Iran.

== Demographics ==
=== Population ===
At the time of the 2006 National Census, the village's population was 530 in 136 households. The following census in 2011 counted 780 people in 222 households. The 2016 census measured the population of the village as 1,107 people in 317 households.
