= Ahmadabad, Kenevist =

Village in Razavi Khorasan province, Iran

Ahmadabad Persian: احمداباد
- Village
- Location within Iran
- Coordinates: 36°25′29″N 59°52′33″E
- Country: Iran
- Province: Razavi Khorasan
- County: Mashhad
- District: Central
- Rural District: Kenevist

Population (2016)
  - Total: 2,388
- Time zone: UTC+3:30 (IRST)

Ahmadabad (Persian: احمداباد) (Note: Also romanized as Aḩmadābād) is a village in Kenevist Rural District of the Central District in Mashhad County, Razavi Khorasan province, Iran.

== Demographics ==
=== Population ===
At the time of the 2006 National Census, the village's population was 1,703 in 315 households. The following census in 2011 counted 2,027 people in 462 households. The 2016 census measured the population of the village as 2,388 people in 605 households.
