= Baghunabad =

Village in Razavi Khorasan province, Iran

Baghunabad Persian: باغون اباد
- Village
- Location within Iran
- Coordinates: 36°24′22″N 59°29′18″E
- Country: Iran
- Province: Razavi Khorasan
- County: Mashhad
- District: Central
- Rural District: Tus

Population (2016)
  - Total: 2,606
- Time zone: UTC+3:30 (IRST)

Baghunabad (Persian: باغون اباد) (Note: Also romanized as Bāghūnābād)) is a village in Tus Rural District of the Central District in Mashhad County, Razavi Khorasan province, Iran.

== Demographics ==
=== Population ===
At the time of the 2006 National Census, the village's population was 659 in 155 households. The following census in 2011 counted 1,666 people in 479 households. The 2016 census measured the population of the village as 2,606 people in 712 households.
