= Parmeh =

Village in Razavi Khorasan province, Iran

Parmeh Persian: پرمه
- Village
- Location within Iran
- Coordinates: 36°26′42″N 59°42′48″E
- Country: Iran
- Province: Razavi Khorasan
- County: Mashhad
- District: Central
- Rural District: Tabadkan

Population (2016)
  - Total: 2,809
- Time zone: UTC+3:30 (IRST)

Parmeh (Persian: پرمه) (Note: Also known as Fārmad (فارمد) and Parheh) is a village in Tabadkan Rural District of the Central District in Mashhad County, Razavi Khorasan province, Iran.

== Demographics ==
=== Population ===
At the time of the 2006 National Census, the village's population was 2,307 in 668 households. The following census in 2011 counted 2,731 people in 831 households. The 2016 census measured the population of the village as 2,809 people in 856 households.
