= Amirabad, Mashhad =

Village in Razavi Khorasan province, Iran

Amirabad Persian: اميراباد
- Village
- Location within Iran
- Coordinates: 36°24′15″N 59°30′55″E
- Country: Iran
- Province: Razavi Khorasan
- County: Mashhad
- District: Central
- Rural District: Tus

Population (2016)
  - Total: 4,792
- Time zone: UTC+3:30 (IRST)

Amirabad (Persian: اميراباد) (Note: Also romanized as Amīrābād; also known as Amīrābād-e Bālā) is a village in Tus Rural District of the Central District in Mashhad County, Razavi Khorasan province, Iran.

== Demographics ==
=== Population ===
At the time of the 2006 National Census, the village's population was 3,206 in 777 households. The following census in 2011 counted 4,244 people in 1,187 households. The 2016 census measured the population of the village as 4,792 people in 1,316 households.
