= Barqi, Razavi Khorasan =

Village in Razavi Khorasan, Iran

Barqi برقي
- Village
- Location within Iran
- Coordinates: 36°23′43″N 59°41′28″E
- Country: Iran
- Province: Razavi Khorasan
- County: Mashhad
- Bakhsh: Central
- Rural District: Tabadkan

Population (2006)
  - Total: 651
- Time zone: UTC+3:30 (IRST)
  - Summer (DST): UTC+4:30 (IRDT)

Barqi (Persian: برقي, also Romanized as Barqī; also known as Qarqī) is a village in Tabadkan Rural District, in the Central District of Mashhad County, Razavi Khorasan Province, Iran. At the 2006 census, its population was 651, in 168 families.

== Gallery ==
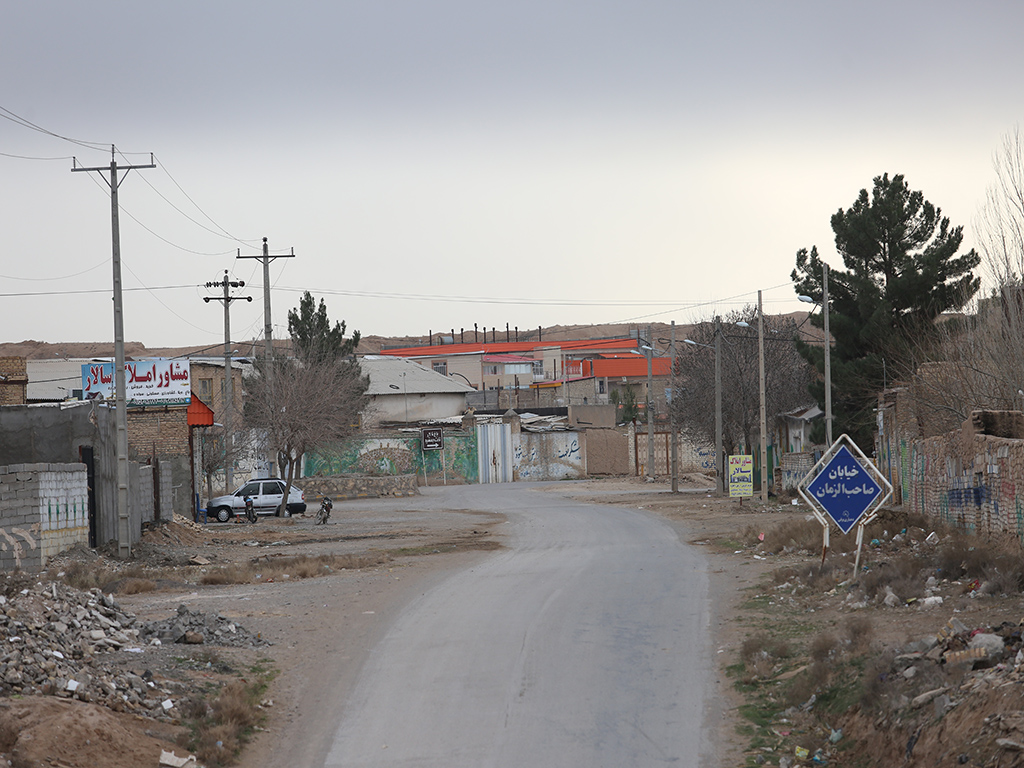
Entrance to the Barqi village

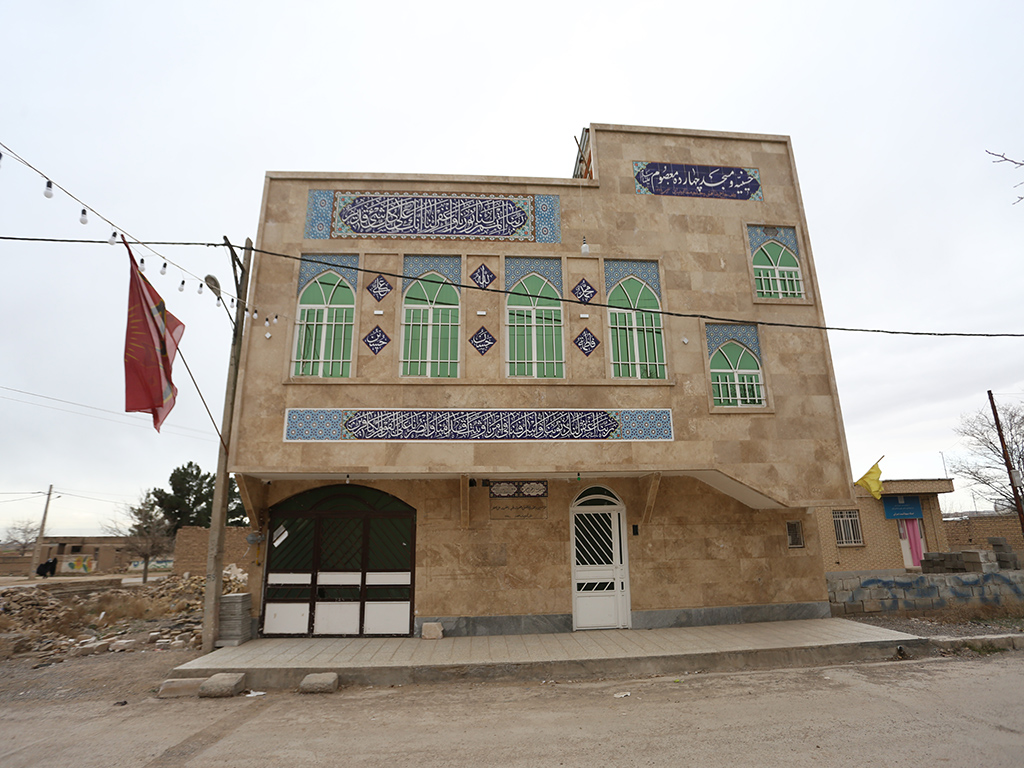
Barqi Village mosque

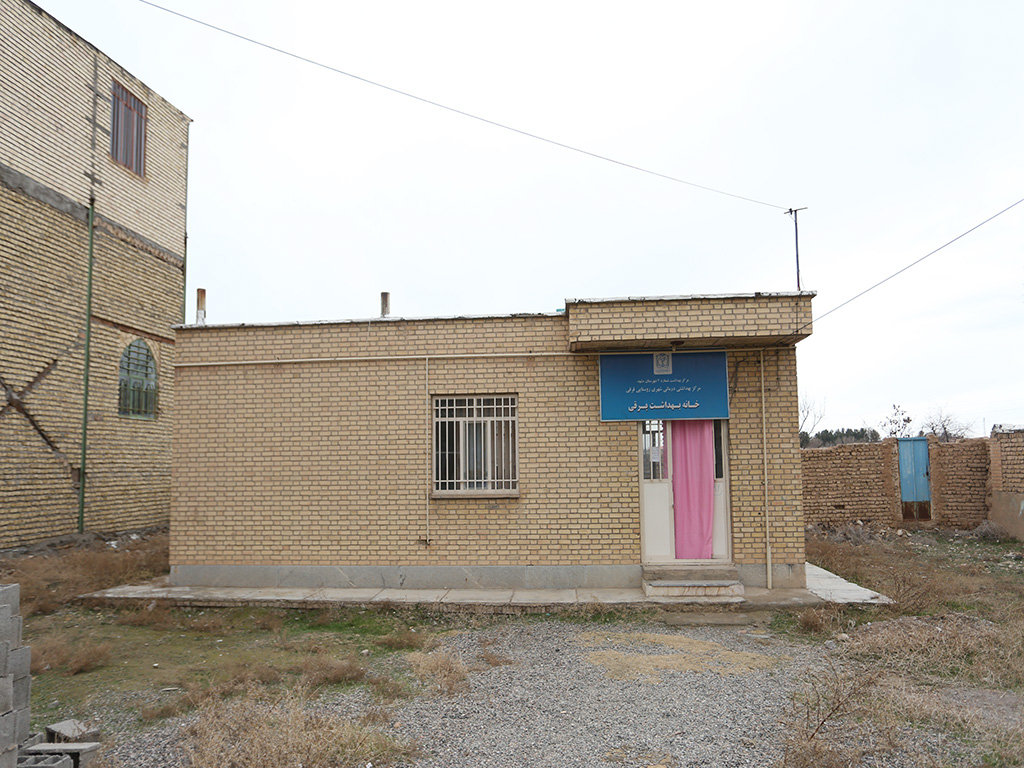
Health House of the Village of Barqi Village

== See also ==
- List of cities, towns and villages in Razavi Khorasan Province
