= Al, Iran =

Village in Razavi Khorasan province, Iran

Al Persian: ال
- Village
- Location within Iran
- Coordinates: 36°43′01″N 59°39′58″E
- Country: Iran
- Province: Razavi Khorasan
- County: Mashhad
- District: Central
- Rural District: Kardeh

Population (2016)
  - Total: 372
- Time zone: UTC+3:30 (IRST)

Al (Persian: ال) (Note: Also romanized as Āl) is a village in Kardeh Rural District of the Central District in Mashhad County, Razavi Khorasan province, Iran.

== Demographics ==
=== Population ===
At the time of the 2006 National Census, the village's population was 370 in 107 households. The following census in 2011 counted 367 people in 121 households. The 2016 census measured the population of the village as 372 people in 132 households.
