= Siasak =

Village in Razavi Khorasan province, Iran

Siasak Persian: سياسك
- Village
- Location within Iran
- Country: Iran
- Province: Razavi Khorasan
- County: Mashhad
- District: Central
- Rural District: Tabadkan

Population (2016)
  - Total: 4,311
- Time zone: UTC+3:30 (IRST)

Siasak (Persian: سياسك) (Note: Also romanized as Sīāsak) is a village in Tabadkan Rural District of the Central District in Mashhad County, Razavi Khorasan province, Iran.

== Demographics ==
=== Population ===
At the time of the 2006 National Census, the village's population was 2,183 in 547 households. The following census in 2011 counted 3,015 people in 852 households. The 2016 census measured the population of the village as 4,311 people in 1,246 households.
