= Hoseynabad-e Qorqi =

Village in Razavi Khorasan province, Iran

Hoseynabad-e Qorqi Persian: حسين ابادقرقي
- Village
- Location within Iran
- Coordinates: 36°23′49″N 59°40′46″E
- Country: Iran
- Province: Razavi Khorasan
- County: Mashhad
- District: Central
- Rural District: Tabadkan

Population (2016)
  - Total: 13,644
- Time zone: UTC+3:30 (IRST)

Hoseynabad-e Qorqi (Persian: حسين ابادقرقي) (Note: Also romanized as Ḩoseynābād-e Qorqī; also known as Ḩoseynābād) is a village in Tabadkan Rural District of the Central District in Mashhad County, Razavi Khorasan province, Iran.

== Demographics ==
=== Population ===
At the time of the 2006 National Census, the village's population was 5,175 in 1,247 households. The following census in 2011 counted 8,093 people in 2,115 households. The 2016 census measured the population of the village as 13,644 people in 3,759 households.
