= Zarkesh, Razavi Khorasan =

Village in Razavi Khorasan province, Iran

Zarkesh Persian: زركش
- Village
- Location within Iran
- Coordinates: 36°24′36″N 59°29′50″E
- Country: Iran
- Province: Razavi Khorasan
- County: Mashhad
- District: Central
- Rural District: Tus

Population (2016)
  - Total: 5,780
- Time zone: UTC+3:30 (IRST)

Zarkesh (Persian: زركش) is a village in Tus Rural District of the Central District in Mashhad County, Razavi Khorasan province, Iran.

== Demographics ==
=== Population ===
At the time of the 2006 National Census, the village's population was 2,524 in 647 households. The following census in 2011 counted 3,953 people in 1,138 households. The 2016 census measured the population of the village as 5,780 people in 1,620 households.
