= Faz, Iran =

Village in Razavi Khorasan province, Iran

Faz Persian: فاز
- Village
- Location within Iran
- Coordinates: 36°28′31″N 59°40′19″E
- Country: Iran
- Province: Razavi Khorasan
- County: Mashhad
- District: Central
- Rural District: Tabadkan

Population (2016)
  - Total: 409
- Time zone: UTC+3:30 (IRST)

Faz (Persian: فاز) (Note: Also romanized as Fāz; also known as Bāzh and Pāz) is a village in, and the capital of, Tabadkan Rural District in the Central District of Mashhad County, Razavi Khorasan province, Iran.

== Demographics ==
=== Population ===
At the time of the 2006 National Census, the village's population was 688 in 193 households. The following census in 2011 counted 656 people in 166 households. The 2016 census measured the population of the village as 409 people in 128 households.
