= Kal Zarkesh =

Village in Razavi Khorasan province, Iran

Kal Zarkesh Persian: كال زركش
- Village
- Location within Iran
- Coordinates: 36°24′00″N 59°30′14″E
- Country: Iran
- Province: Razavi Khorasan
- County: Mashhad
- District: Central
- Rural District: Tus

Population (2016)
  - Total: 6,134
- Time zone: UTC+3:30 (IRST)

Kal Zarkesh (Persian: كال زركش) (Note: Also romanized as Kāl Zarḵesh) is a village in Tus Rural District of the Central District in Mashhad County, Razavi Khorasan province, Iran.

== Demographics ==
=== Population ===
At the time of the 2006 National Census, the village's population was 3,095 in 773 households. The following census in 2011 counted 5,689 people in 1,626 households. The 2016 census measured the population of the village as 6,134 people in 1,836 households.
