= Chahchah =

Village in Razavi Khorasan province, Iran

Chahchah Persian: چهچه
- Village
- Location within Iran
- Coordinates: 36°31′54″N 59°22′10″E
- Country: Iran
- Province: Razavi Khorasan
- County: Mashhad
- District: Central
- Rural District: Miyan Velayat

Population (2016)
  - Total: 1,265
- Time zone: UTC+3:30 (IRST)

Chahchah (Persian: چهچه) (Note: Also known as Chahchaheh) is a village in Miyan Velayat Rural District of the Central District in Mashhad County, Razavi Khorasan province, Iran.

== Demographics ==
=== Population ===
At the time of the 2006 National Census, the village's population was 851 in 220 households. The following census in 2011 counted 1,128 people in 325 households. The 2016 census measured the population of the village as 1,265 people in 366 households.
