= Ferizi, Mashhad =

Village in Razavi Khorasan province, Iran

Ferizi Persian: فريزي
- Village
- Location within Iran
- Coordinates: 36°22′30″N 59°35′40″E
- Country: Iran
- Province: Razavi Khorasan
- County: Mashhad
- District: Central
- Rural District: Tus

Population (2016)
  - Total: 2,485
- Time zone: UTC+3:30 (IRST)

Ferizi (Persian: فريزي) (Note: Also romanized as Ferīzī) is a village in Tus Rural District of the Central District in Mashhad County, Razavi Khorasan province, Iran.

== Demographics ==
=== Population ===
At the time of the 2006 National Census, the village's population was 869 in 217 households. The following census in 2011 counted 1,376 people in 404 households. The 2016 census measured the population of the village as 2,485 people in 726 households.
