= Amrudak, Razavi Khorasan =

Village in Razavi Khorasan province, Iran

Amrudak Persian: امرودك
- Village
- Location within Iran
- Coordinates: 36°50′04″N 59°20′20″E
- Country: Iran
- Province: Razavi Khorasan
- County: Mashhad
- District: Central
- Rural District: Darzab

Population (2016)
  - Total: 810
- Time zone: UTC+3:30 (IRST)

Amrudak (Persian: امرودك) (Note: Also romanized as Amrūdak) is a village in Darzab Rural District of the Central District in Mashhad County, Razavi Khorasan province, Iran.

== Demographics ==
=== Population ===
At the time of the 2006 National Census, the village's population was 1,140 in 265 households. The following census in 2011 counted 909 people in 242 households. The 2016 census measured the population of the village as 810 people in 232 households.
