= Kharabeh Amin =

Village in Razavi Khorasan province, Iran

Kharabeh Amin Persian: خرابه امين
- Village
- Location within Iran
- Coordinates: 36°30′17″N 59°21′08″E
- Country: Iran
- Province: Razavi Khorasan
- County: Mashhad
- District: Central
- Rural District: Miyan Velayat

Population (2016)
  - Total: 1,447
- Time zone: UTC+3:30 (IRST)

Kharabeh Amin (Persian: خرابه امين) (Note: Also romanized as Kharābeh Amīn and Kharābeh-ye Amīn) is a village in Miyan Velayat Rural District of the Central District in Mashhad County, Razavi Khorasan province, Iran.

== Demographics ==
=== Population ===
At the time of the 2006 National Census, the village's population was 1,023 in 252 households. The following census in 2011 counted 1,230 people in 353 households. The 2016 census measured the population of the village as 1,447 people in 425 households.
