= Esmailabad, Tus =

Village in Razavi Khorasan province, Iran

Esmailabad Persian: اسماعيل اباد
- Village
- Location within Iran
- Coordinates: 36°25′30″N 59°30′38″E
- Country: Iran
- Province: Razavi Khorasan
- County: Mashhad
- District: Central
- Rural District: Tus

Population (2016)
  - Total: 2,734
- Time zone: UTC+3:30 (IRST)

Esmailabad (Persian: اسماعيل اباد) (Note: Also romanized as Esmā‘īlābād; also known as Āb Āshḵān (اب اشكان) and Āb Deshkūn) is a village in Tus Rural District of the Central District in Mashhad County, Razavi Khorasan province, Iran.

== Demographics ==
=== Population ===
At the time of the 2006 National Census, the village's population was 2,057 in 507 households. The following census in 2011 counted 2,298 people in 661 households. The 2016 census measured the population of the village as 2,734 people in 785 households.
