= Talqur =

Village in Razavi Khorasan province, Iran

Talqur Persian: تلقور
- Village
- Location within Iran
- Coordinates: 36°49′29″N 59°21′39″E
- Country: Iran
- Province: Razavi Khorasan
- County: Mashhad
- District: Central
- Rural District: Darzab

Population (2016)
  - Total: 502
- Time zone: UTC+3:30 (IRST)

Talqur (Persian: تلقور) (Note: Also romanized as Talqūr; also known as Talghūr, Toghrol (طغرل), Tulghur, and Tūlqūr) is a village in Darzab Rural District of the Central District in Mashhad County, Razavi Khorasan province, Iran.

== Demographics ==
=== Population ===
At the time of the 2006 National Census, the village's population was 503 in 113 households. The following census in 2011 counted 508 people in 150 households. The 2016 census measured the population of the village as 502 people in 155 households.
