= Marian, Razavi Khorasan =

Village in Razavi Khorasan province, Iran

Marian Persian: ماريان
- Village
- Location within Iran
- Coordinates: 36°33′01″N 59°34′43″E
- Country: Iran
- Province: Razavi Khorasan
- County: Mashhad
- District: Central
- Rural District: Darzab

Population (2016)
  - Total: 1,376
- Time zone: UTC+3:30 (IRST)

Marian (Persian: ماريان) (Note: Also romanized as Mārīān and Maryān) is a village in Darzab Rural District of the Central District in Mashhad County, Razavi Khorasan province, Iran.

== Demographics ==
=== Population ===
At the time of the 2006 National Census, the village's population was 1,218 in 303 households. The following census in 2011 counted 1,152 people in 328 households. The 2016 census measured the population of the village as 1,376 people in 420 households.
