= Ruhabad, Mashhad =

Village in Razavi Khorasan province, Iran

Ruhabad Persian: روح اباد
- Village
- Location within Iran
- Coordinates: 36°28′00″N 59°24′34″E
- Country: Iran
- Province: Razavi Khorasan
- County: Mashhad
- District: Central
- Rural District: Miyan Velayat

Population (2016)
  - Total: 1,288
- Time zone: UTC+3:30 (IRST)

Ruhabad (Persian: روح اباد) (Note: Also romanized as Rūḥābād) is a village in Miyan Velayat Rural District of the Central District in Mashhad County, Razavi Khorasan province, Iran.

== Demographics ==
=== Population ===
At the time of the 2006 National Census, the village's population was 728 in 176 households. The following census in 2011 counted 1,029 people in 265 households. The 2016 census measured the population of the village as 1,288 people in 349 households.
