= Gonbadvaz =

Village in Razavi Khorasan province, Iran

Gonbadvaz Persian: گنبدواز
- Village
- Location within Iran
- Coordinates: 36°27′23″N 59°35′20″E
- Country: Iran
- Province: Razavi Khorasan
- County: Mashhad
- District: Central
- Rural District: Tabadkan

Population (2016)
  - Total: 1,036
- Time zone: UTC+3:30 (IRST)

Gonbadvaz (Persian: گنبدواز) (Note: Also romanized as Gonbadvāz) is a village in Tabadkan Rural District of the Central District in Mashhad County, Razavi Khorasan province, Iran.

== Demographics ==
=== Population ===
At the time of the 2006 National Census, the village's population was 678 in 163 households. The following census in 2011 counted 841 people in 252 households. The 2016 census measured the population of the village as 1,036 people in 308 households.
