= Eslamiyeh, Mashhad =

Village in Razavi Khorasan province, Iran

Eslamiyeh Persian: اسلاميه
- Village
- Location within Iran
- Coordinates: 36°29′13″N 59°30′53″E
- Country: Iran
- Province: Razavi Khorasan
- County: Mashhad
- District: Central
- Rural District: Tus

Population (2016)
  - Total: 1,831
- Time zone: UTC+3:30 (IRST)

Eslamiyeh (Persian: اسلاميه) (Note: Also romanized as Eslāmīyeh) is a village in Tus Rural District of the Central District in Mashhad County, Razavi Khorasan province, Iran.

== Demographics ==
=== Population ===
At the time of the 2006 National Census, the village's population was 1,582 in 416 households. The following census in 2011 counted 1,737 people in 498 households. The 2016 census measured the population of the village as 1,831 people in 541 households.
