= Kholqabad-e Sofla =

Village in Razavi Khorasan province, Iran

Kholqabad-e Sofla Persian: خلق ابادسفلي
- Village
- Location within Iran
- Coordinates: 36°23′35″N 59°38′06″E
- Country: Iran
- Province: Razavi Khorasan
- County: Mashhad
- District: Central
- Rural District: Tabadkan

Population (2016)
  - Total: 2,857
- Time zone: UTC+3:30 (IRST)

Kholqabad-e Sofla (Persian: خلق ابادسفلي) (Note: Also romanized as Kholqābād-e Soflá; also known as Kholqābād-e Pā'īn) is a village in Tabadkan Rural District of the Central District in Mashhad County, Razavi Khorasan province, Iran.

== Demographics ==
=== Population ===
At the time of the 2006 National Census, the village's population was 1,158 in 303 households. The following census in 2011 counted 1,980 people in 583 households. The 2016 census measured the population of the village as 2,857 people in 824 households.
