= Deh Rud, Razavi Khorasan =

Village in Razavi Khorasan province, Iran

Deh Rud Persian: دهرود
- Village
- Location within Iran
- Country: Iran
- Province: Razavi Khorasan
- County: Mashhad
- District: Central
- Rural District: Tabadkan

Population (2016)
  - Total: 11,869
- Time zone: UTC+3:30 (IRST)

Deh Rud (Persian: دهرود) (Note: Also romanized as Deh Rūd) is a village in Tabadkan Rural District of the Central District in Mashhad County, Razavi Khorasan province, Iran.

== Demographics ==
=== Population ===
At the time of the 2006 National Census, the village's population was 7,062 in 1,689 households. The following census in 2011 counted 10,373 people in 2,849 households. The 2016 census measured the population of the village as 11,869 people in 3,317 households.
