= Aminabad, Mashhad =

Village in Razavi Khorasan province, Iran

Aminabad Persian: امين اباد
- Village
- Location within Iran
- Coordinates: 36°25′29″N 59°29′20″E
- Country: Iran
- Province: Razavi Khorasan
- County: Mashhad
- District: Central
- Rural District: Tus

Population (2016)
  - Total: 1,342
- Time zone: UTC+3:30 (IRST)

Aminabad (Persian: امين اباد) (Note: Also romanized as Amīnābād) is a village in Tus Rural District of the Central District in Mashhad County, Razavi Khorasan province, Iran.

== Demographics ==
=== Population ===
At the time of the 2006 National Census, the village's population was 704 in 170 households. The following census in 2011 counted 912 people in 253 households. The 2016 census measured the population of the village as 1,342 people in 380 households.
