= Shahrabad, Mashhad =

Village in Razavi Khorasan province, Iran

Shahrabad Persian: شهراباد
- Village
- Location within Iran
- Coordinates: 36°16′20″N 59°43′35″E
- Country: Iran
- Province: Razavi Khorasan
- County: Mashhad
- District: Central
- Rural District: Kenevist

Population (2016)
  - Total: 2,294
- Time zone: UTC+3:30 (IRST)

Shahrabad (Persian: شهراباد) (Note: Also romanized as Shahrābād) is a village in Kenevist Rural District of the Central District in Mashhad County, Razavi Khorasan province, Iran.

== Demographics ==
=== Population ===
At the time of the 2006 National Census, the village's population was 1,315 in 303 households. The following census in 2011 counted 1,825 people in 488 households. The 2016 census measured the population of the village as 2,294 people in 632 households.
