= Pain Deh =

Village in Razavi Khorasan province, Iran

Pain Deh Persian: پايين ده
- Village
- Location within Iran
- Coordinates: 36°31′20″N 59°21′50″E
- Country: Iran
- Province: Razavi Khorasan
- County: Mashhad
- District: Central
- Rural District: Miyan Velayat

Population (2016)
  - Total: 1,664
- Time zone: UTC+3:30 (IRST)

Pain Deh (Persian: پايين ده) (Note: Also romanized as Pā’īn Deh) is a village in Miyan Velayat Rural District of the Central District in Mashhad County, Razavi Khorasan province, Iran.

== Demographics ==
=== Population ===
At the time of the 2006 National Census, the village's population was 1,315 in 314 households. The following census in 2011 counted 1,480 people in 381 households. The 2016 census measured the population of the village as 1,664 people in 448 households.
