= Kardeh =

Village in Razavi Khorasan province, Iran

Kardeh Persian: كارده
- Village
- Location within Iran
- Coordinates: 36°39′09″N 59°40′01″E
- Country: Iran
- Province: Razavi Khorasan
- County: Mashhad
- District: Central
- Rural District: Kardeh

Population (2016)
  - Total: 484
- Time zone: UTC+3:30 (IRST)

Kardeh (Persian: كارده) (Note: Also romanized as Kārdeh; also known as Chahār Deh) is a village in, and the capital of, Kardeh Rural District in the Central District of Mashhad County, Razavi Khorasan province, Iran. The previous capital of the rural district was the village of Mareshk.

== Demographics ==
=== Population ===
At the time of the 2006 National Census, the village's population was 351 in 88 households. The following census in 2011 counted 455 people in 135 households. The 2016 census measured the population of the village as 484 people in 150 households.
