= Khin (name) =

Khin is a Burmese name that may refer to the following notable people:

- Khin Khin (disambiguation), multiple people
- Khin Kyi (1912–1988), Burmese politician and diplomat
- Khin Nyunt (born 1939), Burmese military officer and politician
- Khin Thiri Thet Mon (born c.1982), Burmese businesswoman
- Khin Wint Wah (born 1994), Burmese actress
- Maung Khin (1872–1924), first Burmese Chief Justice of the High Court
- Myint Myint Khin (born 1934), Burmese actress
- Soe Khin (born 1950), Burmese long-distance runner
