= Deheshk, Razavi Khorasan =

Village in Razavi Khorasan province, Iran

Deheshk Persian: دهشك
- Village
- Location within Iran
- Coordinates: 36°30′05″N 59°28′32″E
- Country: Iran
- Province: Razavi Khorasan
- County: Mashhad
- District: Central
- Rural District: Tus

Population (2016)
  - Total: 1,223
- Time zone: UTC+3:30 (IRST)

Deheshk (Persian: دهشك) is a village in Tus Rural District of the Central District in Mashhad County, Razavi Khorasan province, Iran.

== Demographics ==
=== Population ===
At the time of the 2006 National Census, the village's population was 631 in 174 households. The following census in 2011 counted 704 people in 221 households. The 2016 census measured the population of the village as 1,223 people in 355 households.
