= Gorji-ye Sofla =

Village in Razavi Khorasan province, Iran

Gorji-ye Sofla Persian: گرجی سفلی
- Village
- Location within Iran
- Coordinates: 36°23′17″N 59°40′30″E
- Country: Iran
- Province: Razavi Khorasan
- County: Mashhad
- District: Central
- Rural District: Tabadkan

Population (2016)
  - Total: 15,163
- Time zone: UTC+3:30 (IRST)

Gorji-ye Sofla (Persian: گرجی سفلی) (Note: Also romanized as Gorjī-ye Soflá; also known as Gorjī-ye Pā’īn) is a village in Tabadkan Rural District of the Central District in Mashhad County, Razavi Khorasan province, Iran.

== Demographics ==
=== Population ===
At the time of the 2006 National Census, the village's population was 13,367 in 3,156 households. The following census in 2011 counted 15,420 people in 4,203 households. The 2016 census measured the population of the village as 15,163 people in 4,321 households, the most populous in its rural district.
