= Khin Khin =

Khin Khin is a Burmese name that may refer to the following notable people:

- Khin Khin Gyi, Burmese physician and government official
- Khin Khin Htoo (born 1965), Burmese writer
- Khin Khin Win, wife of former President of Myanmar Thein Sein
- Dagon Khin Khin Lay (1904–1981), Burmese novelist, screenwriter, and cinematographer
- Daing Khin Khin (c.1863–1882), concubine of Thibaw Min, the last monarch of the Konbaung dynasty
- Khin Khin Htwe (born 1962), Burmese middle-distance runner
