= Qorqi-ye Sofla =

Village in Razavi Khorasan province, Iran

Qorqi-ye Sofla Persian: قرقي سفلي
- Village
- Location within Iran
- Coordinates: 36°23′14″N 59°40′29″E
- Country: Iran
- Province: Razavi Khorasan
- County: Mashhad
- District: Central
- Rural District: Tabadkan

Population (2016)
  - Total: 11,952
- Time zone: UTC+3:30 (IRST)

Qorqi-ye Sofla (Persian: قرقي سفلي) (Note: Also romanized as Qorqī-ye Soflá; also known as Qarqī and Qorqī) is a village in Tabadkan Rural District of the Central District in Mashhad County, Razavi Khorasan province, Iran.

== Demographics ==
=== Population ===
At the time of the 2006 National Census, the village's population was 4,067 in 1,025 households. The following census in 2011 counted 8,606 people in 2,268 households. The 2016 census measured the population of the village as 11,952 people in 3,329 households.
