= Jorg =

Jorg may refer to:

- Jorg Gray, California-based brand of men's and women's watches
- Jorg Smeets (born 1970), Dutch former footballer
- A battle mech used by the Makron (Quake character), a video game character

== See also ==
- Jörg
