= Qorqi-ye Olya =

Village in Razavi Khorasan province, Iran

Qorqi-ye Olya Persian: قرقي عليا
- Village
- Location within Iran
- Coordinates: 36°24′34″N 59°40′29″E
- Country: Iran
- Province: Razavi Khorasan
- County: Mashhad
- District: Central
- Rural District: Tabadkan

Population (2016)
  - Total: 5,299
- Time zone: UTC+3:30 (IRST)

Qorqi-ye Olya (Persian: قرقي عليا) (Note: Also romanized as Qorqī-ye ‘Olyā; also known as Qarqī and Qorqī) is a village in Tabadkan Rural District of the Central District in Mashhad County, Razavi Khorasan province, Iran.

== Demographics ==
=== Population ===
At the time of the 2006 National Census, the village's population was 1,098 in 279 households. The following census in 2011 counted 1,121 people in 308 households. The 2016 census measured the population of the village as 5,299 people in 1,569 households.
