= Gajvan =

Village in Razavi Khorasan province, Iran

Gajvan Persian: گجوان
- Village
- Location within Iran
- Coordinates: 36°34′41″N 59°30′56″E
- Country: Iran
- Province: Razavi Khorasan
- County: Mashhad
- District: Central
- Rural District: Darzab

Population (2016)
  - Total: 1,222
- Time zone: UTC+3:30 (IRST)

Gajvan (Persian: گجوان) (Note: Also romanized as Gajvān; also known as Kajvān) is a village in Darzab Rural District of the Central District in Mashhad County, Razavi Khorasan province, Iran.

== Demographics ==
=== Population ===
At the time of the 2006 National Census, the village's population was 959 in 238 households. The following census in 2011 counted 1,126 people in 321 households. The 2016 census measured the population of the village as 1,222 people in 364 households.
