= Gorji-ye Olya =

Village in Razavi Khorasan province, Iran

Gorji-ye Olya Persian: گرجي عليا
- Village
- Location within Iran
- Coordinates: 36°21′54″N 59°38′37″E
- Country: Iran
- Province: Razavi Khorasan
- County: Mashhad
- District: Central
- Rural District: Tabadkan

Population (2016)
  - Total: 2,394
- Time zone: UTC+3:30 (IRST)

Gorji-ye Olya (Persian: گرجي عليا) (Note: Also romanized as Gorjī-ye ‘Olyā; also known as Gorjī and Gorjī-ye Bālā) is a village in Tabadkan Rural District of the Central District in Mashhad County, Razavi Khorasan province, Iran.

== Demographics ==
=== Population ===
At the time of the 2006 National Census, the village's population was 1,430 in 355 households. The following census in 2011 counted 2,000 people in 546 households. The 2016 census measured the population of the village as 2,394 people in 672 households.
