= Tus-e Sofla =

Village in Razavi Khorasan province, Iran

Tus-e Sofla Persian: طوس سفلي
- Village
- Location within Iran
- Coordinates: 36°29′01″N 59°31′09″E
- Country: Iran
- Province: Razavi Khorasan
- County: Mashhad
- District: Central
- Rural District: Tus

Population (2016)
  - Total: 3,114
- Time zone: UTC+3:30 (IRST)

Tus-e Sofla (Persian: طوس سفلي) (Note: Also romanized as Ţūs-e Soflá; also known as Shahr-e Ţūs-e Pā'īn) is a village in Tus Rural District of the Central District in Mashhad County, Razavi Khorasan province, Iran.

== Demographics ==
=== Population ===
At the time of the 2006 National Census, the village's population was 2,748 in 682 households. The following census in 2011 counted 3,027 people in 832 households. The 2016 census measured the population of the village as 3,114 people in 913 households.
