= Tabadkan, Iran =

Village in Razavi Khorasan province, Iran

Tabadkan Persian: تبادكان
- Village
- Location within Iran
- Coordinates: 36°28′43″N 59°54′27″E
- Country: Iran
- Province: Razavi Khorasan
- County: Mashhad
- District: Central
- Rural District: Kenevist

Population (2016)
  - Total: 1,596
- Time zone: UTC+3:30 (IRST)

Tabadkan (Persian: تبادكان) (Note: Also romanized as Tabādakān and Tabādkān; also known as Nabādkān and Tabādqān) is a village in Kenevist Rural District of the Central District in Mashhad County, Razavi Khorasan Province, Iran.

== Demographics ==
=== Population ===
At the time of the 2006 National Census, the village's population was 1,597 in 418 households. The following census in 2011 counted 1,509 people in 440 households. The 2016 census measured the population of the village as 1,596 people in 508 households.
