= Khin-e Arab =

Village in Razavi Khorasan province, Iran

Khin-e Arab Persian: خين عرب
- Village
- Location within Iran
- Coordinates: 36°21′59″N 59°36′13″E
- Country: Iran
- Province: Razavi Khorasan
- County: Mashhad
- District: Central
- Rural District: Tus

Population (2016)
  - Total: 1,984
- Time zone: UTC+3:30 (IRST)

Khin-e Arab (Persian: خين عرب) (Note: Also romanized as Khīn-e ‘Arab) is a village in Tus Rural District of the Central District in Mashhad County, Razavi Khorasan province, Iran.

The street leading to the village is called Tarhchi Street (طرحچی), home to a large market of iron-bar trades and hundreds of workshops creating both craft furniture and metal works.

== Demographics ==
=== Population ===
At the time of the 2006 National Census, the village's population was 547 in 153 households. The following census in 2011 counted 1,275 people in 375 households. The 2016 census measured the population of the village as 1,984 people in 552 households.
