= Kenevist =

Village in Razavi Khorasan province, Iran

Kenevist Persian: کنویست
- Village
- Location within Iran
- Coordinates: 36°17′30″N 59°49′19″E
- Country: Iran
- Province: Razavi Khorasan
- County: Mashhad
- District: Central
- Rural District: Kenevist

Population (2016)
  - Total: 3,695
- Time zone: UTC+3:30 (IRST)

Kenevist (Persian: کنویست) (Note: Also romanized as Kanvīst and Kenevīst; also known as Kanavīs, Kanāwez, Kaneh Bīst, Kanvīs, Kanvis, Kenevīs, and Kineh Biset (كينه بيست)) is a village in, and the capital of, Kenevist Rural District in the Central District of Mashhad County, Razavi Khorasan province, Iran. It was the capital of Meyami Rural District, until its administrative center was transferred to the city of Razaviyeh.

== Demographics ==
=== Population ===
At the time of the 2006 National Census, the village's population was 3,218 in 792 households. The following census in 2011 counted 3,356 people in 976 households. The 2016 census measured the population of the village as 3,695 people in 1,082 households, the most populous in its rural district.
