= Dezq, Mashhad =

Village in Razavi Khorasan province, Iran

Dezq Persian: دزق
- Village
- Location within Iran
- Coordinates: 36°37′30″N 59°29′59″E
- Country: Iran
- Province: Razavi Khorasan
- County: Mashhad
- District: Central
- Rural District: Darzab

Population (2016)
  - Total: 788
- Time zone: UTC+3:30 (IRST)

Dezq (Persian: دزق) is a village in Darzab Rural District of the Central District in Mashhad County, Razavi Khorasan province, Iran.

== Demographics ==
=== Population ===
At the time of the 2006 National Census, the village's population was 601 in 158 households. The following census in 2011 counted 680 people in 207 households. The 2016 census measured the population of the village as 788 people in 254 households.
