= Gorgi-ye Manderek =

Gorgi-ye Manderek گرگي مندرك
- Village
- Location within Iran
- Coordinates: 34°00′09″N 46°53′58″E
- Country: Iran
- Province: Kermanshah
- County: Eslamabad-e Gharb
- Bakhsh: Central
- Rural District: Hasanabad

Population (2006)
  - Total: 637
- Time zone: UTC+3:30 (IRST)
  - Summer (DST): UTC+4:30 (IRDT)

Gorgi-ye Manderek (Persian: گرگي مندرك, also Romanized as Gorgī-ye Manderek; also known as Gorgeh'ī, Gorgeh-ye Manderek, Gorgey, Gorgī, Gorgor Manderek, and Gurgai) is a village in Hasanabad Rural District, in the Central District of Eslamabad-e Gharb County, Kermanshah Province, Iran. At the 2006 census, its population was 637, in 126 families.
