= Jorg Gray =

- Industry: Watches
- Founded: 1998; 27 years ago in Tustin, California, United States
- Founder: Logomark, Inc.
- Website: jorggray.com

Jorg Gray is a California-based brand of wristwatches.

== History ==
Jorg Gray was established as a watch line in 1998 by Logomark, Inc. in Tustin, California. Originally, its watches were manufactured as promotional items for corporations and federal agencies. It became a retail-only brand in 2009.

The brand gained global exposure when Barack Obama was photographed wearing a JG6500 gifted to him by the U.S. Secret Service. It bears the Secret Service logo on the dial. The JG 6500 was also worn in 2017 by actor Stephan James in the 10-episode Fox TV series Shots Fired.

== Brand ambassadors ==
Jorg Gray brand ambassadors include Indy Racer Alex Tagliani, MotoGP and former WorldBike Champion Ben Spies, US international and Seattle Sounders FC soccer player Clint Dempsey, and Connor De Phillippi.

== Collection ==
Jorg Gray timepieces include Presidential, Classic, Sport, Chronograph, and Limited Edition watches for both men and women. The company added the JG6500 Automatic to the product lineup in November 2015. The brand launched a women's collection in 2013.
