= Gorjiduz =

A Gorjiduz (Persian: گرجیدوز) was a leather craftsman who practised the profession known as gorjiduzi; creating leather Georgian-style shoes. The gorjiduz were commonly found in cities and towns in 19th century Qajar Iran, and formed their own associations (i.e. guilds).

Formerly, the gorjiduz also made Georgian shoes for males; these male versions were commonly worn in Iran, but fell into disuse in the course of the 19th century. Thus, the gorjiduz had become synonym with being a crafter of female Georgian shoes.

In his assessment of the 1853 building survey of the Grand Bazaar of Tehran, Nobuaki Kondo notes that it hosted many of Tehran's gorjiduzi shops.

In his Geography of Isfahan, Mirza Hosayn (son of Ebrāhīm Khan Taḥwīldār) noted that in the 1890s the business of numerous specialized leather craftsmen in Isfahan, including that of the gorjiduz, had declined.

== Sources ==
- Floor, Willem M. (1990). "ČARM". Encyclopaedia Iranica, Vol. IV, Fasc. 7. pp. 820–822.
- Floor, Willem (1999). The Persian textile industry in historical perspective, 1500-1925. Harmattan. ISBN 978-2738483805.
- Floor, Willem (2003). Traditional Crafts in Qajar Iran (1800-1925). Mazda Publishers. ISBN 978-1568591476.
- Floor, Willem (2009a). Guilds, Merchants, and Ulama in Nineteenth-century Iran. Mage Publishers. ISBN 978-1933823317.
- Floor, Willem (2009b). Labor and Industry in Iran, 1850-1941. Mage Publishers. ISBN 978-1933823287.
- Kondo, Nobuaki (2017). Islamic Law and Society in Iran: A Social History of Qajar Tehran. Routledge. ISBN 978-1351783194.
