= Gorgi, Iran =

Gorgi گرگي
- Village
- Location within Iran
- Coordinates: 30°18′59″N 51°27′14″E
- Country: Iran
- Province: Fars
- County: Rostam
- Bakhsh: Central
- Rural District: Rostam-e Do

Population (2006)
  - Total: 52
- Time zone: UTC+3:30 (IRST)
  - Summer (DST): UTC+4:30 (IRDT)

Gorgi (Persian: گرگي, also Romanized as Gorgī) is a village in Rostam-e Do Rural District, in the Central District of Rostam County, Fars province, Iran. At the 2006 census, its population was 52, in 9 families.
