= Seyl Gorgi =

Seyl Gorgi سيل گرگي
- Village
- Location within Iran
- Coordinates: 33°36′09″N 48°38′33″E
- Country: Iran
- Province: Lorestan
- County: Khorramabad
- Bakhsh: Bayravand
- Rural District: Beyranvand-e Jonubi

Population (2006)
  - Total: 94
- Time zone: UTC+3:30 (IRST)
  - Summer (DST): UTC+4:30 (IRDT)

Seyl Gorgi (Persian: سيل گرگي, also Romanized as Seyl Gorgī, Seyl Gorjī, and Sīl Gorjī; also known as Gorgī) is a village in Beyranvand-e Jonubi Rural District, Bayravand District, Khorramabad County, Lorestan Province, Iran. At the 2006 census, its population was 94, in 23 families.
