= Gwrgi (disambiguation) =

Gwrgi, brother of Peredur, is a figure of medieval British legend.

Gwrgi may also refer to:

- Gwrgi Severi, a huntsman mentioned in Culhwch ac Olwen who helps King Arthur track the boar Twrch Trwyth
- Gwrgi Garwlwyd ("Rough grey"), a figure in one of the Welsh Triads

== See also ==
- Gurgi, character in Lloyd Alexander's series from the 1960s, The Chronicles of Prydain
