= Khin, Kalikot =

Khin खीन
- Village development committee
- Location in Nepal
- Coordinates: 29°22′30″N 81°52′30″E
- Country: Nepal
- Zone: Karnali Zone
- District: Kalikot District

Population (1991)
  - Total: 2,496
- Time zone: UTC+5:45 (Nepal Time)

Khin is a village development committee in Kalikot District in the Karnali Zone of north-western Nepal. At the time of the 1991 Nepal census it had a population of 2496 people living in 479 individual households.
