= Khvor-e Khiari =

Khvor-e Khiari خورخياري
- Village
- Location within Iran
- Coordinates: 27°28′16″N 56°38′32″E
- Country: Iran
- Province: Hormozgan
- County: Bandar Abbas
- Bakhsh: Takht
- Rural District: Takht

Population (2006)
  - Total: 84
- Time zone: UTC+3:30 (IRST)
  - Summer (DST): UTC+4:30 (IRDT)

Khvor-e Khiari (Persian: خورخياري, also Romanized as Khvor-e Khīārī and Khowr Khīārī) is a village in Takht Rural District, Takht District, Bandar Abbas County, Hormozgan Province, Iran. At the 2006 census, its population was 84, in 22 families.
