= Khur-e Mollu =

Khur-e Mollu خورملو
- Village
- Location within Iran
- Coordinates: 26°31′41″N 54°45′50″E
- Country: Iran
- Province: Hormozgan
- County: Bandar Lengeh
- Bakhsh: Central
- Rural District: Moghuyeh

Population (2006)
  - Total: 117
- Time zone: UTC+3:30 (IRST)
  - Summer (DST): UTC+4:30 (IRDT)

Khur-e Mollu (Persian: خورملو, also Romanized as Khūr-e Mollū) is a village in Moghuyeh Rural District, in the Central District of Bandar Lengeh County, Hormozgan Province, Iran. At the 2006 census, its population was 117, in 18 families.
