= Kardeh Rural District =

Rural district in Razavi Khorasan province, Iran

Kardeh Rural District Persian: دهستان كارده
- Rural District
- Location within Iran
- Coordinates: 36°48′N 59°32′E
- Country: Iran
- Province: Razavi Khorasan
- County: Mashhad
- District: Central
- Established: 1986
- Capital: Kardeh

Population (2016)
  - Total: 5,354
- Time zone: UTC+3:30 (IRST)

Kardeh Rural District (Persian: دهستان كارده) is in the Central District of Mashhad County, Razavi Khorasan province, Iran. Its capital is the village of Kardeh. The previous capital of the rural district was the village of Mareshk.

== Demographics ==
=== Population ===
At the time of the 2006 National Census, the rural district's population was 7,096 in 1,745 households. There were 6,115 inhabitants in 1,655 households at the following census of 2011. The 2016 census measured the population of the rural district as 5,354 in 1,628 households. The most populous of its 18 villages was Mareshk, with 932 people.

=== Other villages in the rural district ===
- Al
- Bolghur
- Dar Biaban
- Kharkat
- Khvajeh Hoseynabad
- Kushkabad
- Sij
