= Gorji (surname) =

Gorji (Persian: گرجی) is an Iranian surname, meaning Georgian. Notable people with the surname include:

- Khosrow Khan Gorji (1785/6–1857), governor in Qajar Iran
- Manuchehr Khan Gorji (died 1847), governor in Qajar Iran
- Monireh Gorji (1929–2025), Iranian teacher and mujtahid
- Nematollah Gorji (1926–2000), Iranian theatre and film actor of Georgian origin
- Sohrab Khan Gorji, courtier in 19th-century Qajar Iran of Georgian origin
- Zhina Modares Gorji, Iranian book seller, and feminist podcaster
