= Gorji Bayan =

Gorji Bayan گرجي بيان
- Village
- Location within Iran
- Coordinates: 35°00′40″N 47°29′52″E
- Country: Iran
- Province: Kermanshah
- County: Sonqor
- Bakhsh: Central
- Rural District: Gavrud

Population (2006)
  - Total: 469
- Time zone: UTC+3:30 (IRST)
  - Summer (DST): UTC+4:30 (IRDT)

Gorji Bayan (Persian: گرجي بيان, also Romanized as Gorjī Bayān; also known as Ghūrjī, Ghūrjī Bayan, and Gorjī) is a village in Gavrud Rural District, in the Central District of Sonqor County, Kermanshah Province, Iran. At the 2006 census, its population was 469, in 102 families.
