= Khin Khin Gyi =

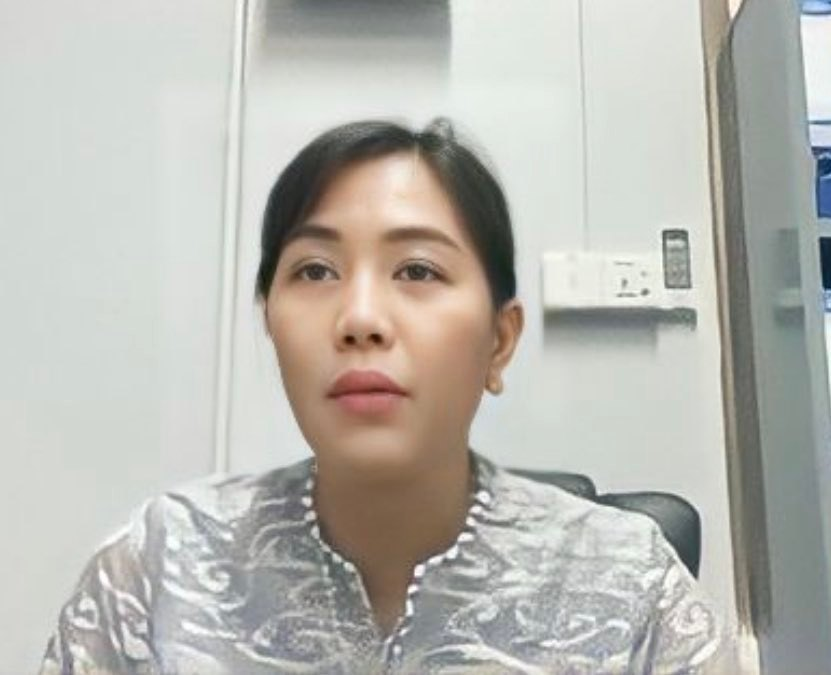
Dr Khin Khin Gyi in 2020

Khin Khin Gyi (Burmese: ခင်ခင်ကြီး) is a Burmese physician and government official who is currently serving as the director of Myanmar's Central Epidemiology Unit and Eradication Department. She is also an ex-senior spokeswoman for the Ministry of Health and Sports.

During the COVID-19 pandemic in Myanmar, Khin Khin Gyi collected and managed real-time information in order to keep the public informed about the Health Ministry's response to COVID-19. Residents of Myanmar were allowed to ask questions and state their concerns on her Facebook account. She was named in The Irrawaddy's article "Ten Myanmar Women Who Inspired Us in 2020".
