= Kenevist Rural District =

Rural district in Razavi Khorasan province, Iran

Kenevist Rural District Persian: دهستان كنويست
- Rural District
- Location within Iran
- Coordinates: 36°23′N 59°52′E
- Country: Iran
- Province: Razavi Khorasan
- County: Mashhad
- District: Central
- Established: 1991
- Capital: Kenevist

Population (2016)
  - Total: 27,987
- Time zone: UTC+3:30 (IRST)

Kenevist Rural District (Persian: دهستان كنويست) is in the Central District of Mashhad County, Razavi Khorasan province, Iran. Its capital is the village of Kenevist.

== Demographics ==
=== Population ===
At the time of the 2006 National Census, the rural district's population was 29,184 in 7,031 households. There were 22,538 inhabitants in 6,289 households at the following census of 2011. The 2016 census measured the population of the rural district as 27,987 in 8,095 households. The most populous of its 57 villages was Kenevist, with 3,695 people.

=== Other villages in the rural district ===
- Ahmadabad
- Amarghan-e Sofla
- Borzeshabad
- Hendelabad
- Joghri
- Karimabad
- Shahrabad
- Shotorak
- Tabadkan
