= Darzab Rural District =

Rural district in Razavi Khorasan province, Iran

Darzab Rural District Persian: دهستان درزآب
- Rural District
- Location within Iran
- Coordinates: 36°42′N 59°29′E
- Country: Iran
- Province: Razavi Khorasan
- County: Mashhad
- District: Central
- Established: 1986
- Capital: Govareshk

Population (2016)
  - Total: 13,112
- Time zone: UTC+3:30 (IRST)

Darzab Rural District (Persian: دهستان درزآب) is in the Central District of Mashhad County, Razavi Khorasan province, Iran. Its capital is the village of Govareshk.

== Demographics ==
=== Population ===
At the time of the 2006 National Census, the rural district's population was 12,886 in 3,188 households. There were 12,192 inhabitants in 3,496 households at the following census of 2011. The 2016 census measured the population of the rural district as 13,112 in 3,986 households. The most populous of its 51 villages was Zak, with 1,421 people.

=== Other villages in the rural district ===
- Amrudak
- Andad
- Dezq
- Gajvan
- Marian
- Qaleh Now-e Valiabad
- Talqur
