= Tus Rural District =

Rural district in Razavi Khorasan province, Iran

Tus Rural District Persian: دهستان طوس
- Rural District
- Location within Iran
- Coordinates: 36°26′N 59°30′E
- Country: Iran
- Province: Razavi Khorasan
- County: Mashhad
- District: Central
- Capital: Kazemabad

Population (2016)
  - Total: 97,695
- Time zone: UTC+3:30 (IRST)

Tus Rural District (Persian: دهستان طوس) is in the Central District of Mashhad County, Razavi Khorasan province, Iran. Its capital is the village of Kazemabad.

== Demographics ==
=== Population ===
At the time of the 2006 National Census, the rural district's population was 128,405 in 32,291 households. There were 77,880 inhabitants in 21,911 households at the following census of 2011. The 2016 census measured the population of the rural district as 97,695 in 27,925 households. The most populous of its 65 villages was Kashaf, with 11,459 people.

=== Other villages in the rural district ===
- Akbarabad
- Aminabad
- Amirabad
- Baghunabad
- Chahar Borj
- Chehel Hojreh
- Deheshk
- Dustabad
- Eslamiyeh
- Esmailabad
- Ferizi
- Kal Zarkesh
- Kalateh-ye Barfi
- Khin-e Arab
- Kushk-e Mehdi
- Manzelabad
- Mordar Keshan
- Seydabad
- Shahid Hashemi Nezhad
- Tus-e Sofla
- Zarkesh
