= Miyan Velayat Rural District =

Rural district in Razavi Khorasan province, Iran

Miyan Velayat Rural District Persian: دهستان ميان ولايت
- Rural District
- Location within Iran
- Coordinates: 36°32′N 59°22′E
- Country: Iran
- Province: Razavi Khorasan
- County: Mashhad
- District: Central
- Established: 1986
- Capital: Asgariyeh

Population (2016)
  - Total: 29,751
- Time zone: UTC+3:30 (IRST)

Miyan Velayat Rural District (Persian: دهستان ميان ولايت) is in the Central District of Mashhad County, Razavi Khorasan province, Iran. Its capital is the village of Asgariyeh.

== Demographics ==
=== Population ===
At the time of the 2006 National Census, the rural district's population was 20,397 in 4,885 households. There were 23,502 inhabitants in 6,324 households at the following census of 2011. The 2016 census measured the population of the rural district as 29,751 in 8,003 households. The most populous of its 60 villages was Saghravan, with 4,455 people.

=== Other villages in the rural district ===
- Chahchah
- Kharabeh Amin
- Kurdeh
- Nazeriyeh
- Pain Deh
- Rezavieh
- Ruhabad
