= Tabadkan Rural District =

Rural district in Razavi Khorasan province, Iran

Tabadkan Rural District Persian: دهستان تبادكان
- Rural District
- Location within Iran
- Coordinates: 36°33′N 59°47′E
- Country: Iran
- Province: Razavi Khorasan
- County: Mashhad
- District: Central
- Established: 1986
- Capital: Faz

Population (2016)
  - Total: 105,285
- Time zone: UTC+3:30 (IRST)

Tabadkan Rural District (Persian: دهستان تبادكان) is in the Central District of Mashhad County, Razavi Khorasan province, Iran. Its capital is the village of Faz.

== Demographics ==
=== Population ===
At the time of the 2006 National Census, the rural district's population was 71,170 in 17,696 households. There were 83,159 inhabitants in 23,139 households at the following census of 2011. The 2016 census measured the population of the rural district as 105,285 in 30,239 households. The most populous of its 86 villages was Gorji-ye Sofla, with 15,163 people.

=== Other villages in the rural district ===
- Aliabad
- Bahar
- Darabad-e Shahzadeh
- Deh Rud
- Eslamabad-e Chahar Gavareh
- Farkhad
- Gonbadvaz
- Gorji-ye Olya
- Hemmatabad
- Hoseynabad-e Qorqi
- Kazemabad-e Panjshanbeh
- Kholqabad-e Sofla
- Kola Kub
- Parmeh
- Qorqi-ye Olya
- Qorqi-ye Sofla
- Shaye
- Siasak
- Zirkan

== See also ==
- Sisabad, a former village in the rural district and now a neighborhood in the city of Mashhad
