= Central District (Mashhad County) =

District in Razavi Khorasan province, Iran

Central District (Mashhad County) Persian: بخش مرکزی شهرستان مشهد
- District
- Location within Iran
- Coordinates: 36°35′N 59°39′E
- Country: Iran
- Province: Razavi Khorasan
- County: Mashhad
- Capital: Mashhad

Population (2016)
  - Total: 3,280,368
- Time zone: UTC+3:30 (IRST)

The Central District of Mashhad County (Persian: بخش مرکزی شهرستان مشهد) is in Razavi Khorasan province, Iran. Its capital is the city of Mashhad.

== Demographics ==
=== Population ===
At the time of the 2006 National Census, the district's population was 2,679,938 in 704,045 households. The following census in 2011 counted 2,991,644 people in 867,205 households. The 2016 census measured the population of the district as 3,280,368 inhabitants in 994,022 households.

=== Administrative divisions ===
Central District (Mashhad County) Population
Administrative Divisions	2006	2011	2016
Darzab RD	12,886	12,192	13,112
Kardeh RD	7,096	6,115	5,354
Kenevist RD	29,184	22,538	27,987
Miyan Velayat RD	20,397	23,502	29,751
Tabadkan RD	71,170	83,159	105,285
Tus RD	128,405	77,880	97,695
Mashhad (city)	2,410,800	2,766,258	3,001,184
Total	2,679,938	2,991,644	3,280,368
RD = Rural District
