= Karimabad =

Karimabad (Persian: كريم آباد) may refer to:

== Iran ==
=== Alborz Province ===
- Karimabad, Alborz, a village in Nazarabad County

=== Chaharmahal and Bakhtiari Province ===
- Karimabad, Ardal, a village in Ardal County
- Karimabad, Kuhrang, a village in Kuhrang County

=== East Azerbaijan Province ===
- Karimabad, Charuymaq, a village in Charuymaq County
- Karimabad, Meyaneh, a village in Meyaneh County
- Karim Abad, Meyaneh, a village in Meyaneh County
- Karimabad, Kolah Boz-e Sharqi, a village in Meyaneh County

=== Fars Province ===
- Karimabad, Hashivar, a village in Darab County
- Karimabad, Paskhan, a village in Darab County
- Karimabad, Fasa, a village in Fasa County
- Karimabad, Mohr, a village in Mohr County
- Karimabad-e Jadval-e Now, a village in Shiraz County

=== Golestan Province ===
- Karimabad, Galikash, a village in Galikash County
- Karimabad, Gorgan, a village in Gorgan County
- Karimabad, Kordkuy, a village in Kordkuy County

=== Hamadan Province ===
- Karimabad, Bahar, a village in Bahar County
- Karimabad, Malayer, a village in Malayer County
- Karimabad, Tuyserkan, a village in Tuyserkan County

=== Hormozgan Province ===
- Karimabad, Hormozgan, a village in Rudan County

=== Isfahan Province ===
- Karimabad, Ardestan, a village in Ardestan County
- Karimabad, Isfahan, a village in Isfahan County

=== Kerman Province ===
- Karimabad-e Sofla, a village in Anbarabad County
- Karimabad-e Olya, Anbarabad, a village in Anbarabad County
- Karimabad-e Ansari, a village in Fahraj County
- Karimabad-e Tabasi, a village in Fahraj County
- Karimabad-e Sargorich, a village in Faryab County
- Karimabad, Kerman, a village in Kerman County
- Karimabad-e Abnil, a village in Kerman County
- Karimabad-e Gavkhaneh, a village in Kerman County
- Karimabad-e Hajj Ali, a village in Kerman County
- Karimabad-e Robat, a village in Kerman County
- Karimabad-e Sardar, a village in Kerman County
- Karimabad-e Olya, Rafsanjan, a village in Rafsanjan County
- Karimabad, Ravar, a village in Ravar County
- Karimabad, Rigan, a village in Rigan County
- Karimabad-e Posht-e Dig, a village in Rigan County
- Karimabad, Rudbar-e Jonubi, a village in Rudbar-e Jonubi County
- Karimabad, Sirjan, a village in Sirjan County
- Karimabad, Chahar Gonbad, a village in Sirjan County
- Karimabad, Zarand, a village in Zarand County

=== Kermanshah Province ===
- Karimabad, Kangavar, a village in Kangavar County
- Karimabad, Ravansar, a village in Ravansar County
- Karimabad, Sahneh, a village in Sahneh County

=== Khuzestan Province ===
- Karimabad, Andika, a village in Andika County
- Karimabad, Behbahan, a village in Behbahan County
- Karimabad, Hendijan, a village in Hendijan County
- Karimabad, Lali, a village in Lali County
- Karimabad, Masjed Soleyman, a village in Masjed Soleyman County
- Karimabad, Ramshir, a village in Ramshir County

=== Kohgiluyeh and Boyer-Ahmad Province ===
- Karimabad, Kohgiluyeh and Boyer-Ahmad, a village in Boyer-Ahmad County

=== Kurdistan Province ===
- Karimabad, Baneh, a village in Baneh County
- Karimabad, Qorveh, a village in Qorveh County
- Karimabad, Serishabad, a village in Qorveh County
- Karimabad, Saqqez, a village in Saqqez County
- Karimabad-e Ayaghchi, a village in Saqqez County

=== Lorestan Province ===
- Karimabad (33°55′ N 47°46′ E), Delfan, a village in Delfan County
- Karimabad Nurali, a village in Delfan County
- Karimabad Qadim, a village in Delfan County
- Karimabad, Khorramabad, a village in Khorramabad County
- Karimabad, Doab, a village in Selseleh County
- Karimabad, Yusefvand, a village in Selseleh County

=== Markazi Province ===
- Karimabad, Markazi, a village in Zarandieh County

=== Mazandaran Province ===
- Karimabad, Chalus, a village in Chalus County
- Karimabad, Kelardasht, a village in Chalus County

=== North Khorasan Province ===
- Karimabad-e Olya, North Khorasan, a village in Esfarayen County
- Karimabad-e Sofla, North Khorasan, a village in Esfarayen County

=== Qom Province ===
- Karimabad, Qom, a village in Qom Province, Iran

=== Razavi Khorasan Province ===
- Karimabad, Jowayin, a village in Jowayin County
- Karimabad, Kalat, a village in Kalat County
- Karimabad, Kardeh, a village in Mashhad County
- Karimabad, Kenevist, a village in Mashhad County
- Karimabad, Nishapur, a village in Nishapur County
- Karimabad, Zeberkhan, a village in Nishapur County
- Karimabad-e Suis, a village in Nishapur County
- Karimabad, Rashtkhvar, a village in Rashtkhvar County

=== Sistan and Baluchestan Province ===
- Karimabad, Chabahar, a village in Chabahar County
- Karimabad, Iranshahr, a village in Iranshahr County
- Karimabad, alternate name of Kur-e Kelkian, a village in Iranshahr County
- Karimabad, Eskelabad, a village in Khash County
- Karimabad, Gowhar Kuh, a village in Khash County
- Karimabad-e Hajji Karim, a village in Khash County
- Karimabad-e Kheybar, a village in Khash County
- Karimabad-e Seyyed Ali Khamenehi, a village in Khash County
- Karimabad, Qasr-e Qand, a village in Qasr-e Qand County

=== South Khorasan Province ===
- Karimabad, Jolgeh-e Mazhan, a village in Khusf County
- Karimabad, Qaleh Zari, a village in Khusf County
- Karimabad, Sarbisheh, a village in Sarbisheh County
- Karimabad, Dastgerdan, a village in Tabas County
- Karimabad, Kuh Yakhab, a village in Tabas County

=== Tehran Province ===
- Karimabad, Tehran, a village in Tehran County
- Karimabad, Pakdasht, a village in Pakdasht County
- Karimabad-e Muqufeh, a village in Rey County
- Karimabad-e Tehranchi, a village in Rey County
- Karimabad Rural District

=== West Azerbaijan Province ===
- Karimabad, Poldasht, a village in Poldasht County
- Karimabad, Takab, a village in Takab County
- Karimabad, Nazlu, a village in Urmia County
- Karimabad, Silvaneh, a village in Urmia County

=== Yazd Province ===
- Karimabad, Behabad, a village in Behabad County
- Karimabad, Mehriz, a village in Mehriz County

== Pakistan ==
- Karimabad, Gilgit-Baltistan, the main town of Hunza in Gilgit-Baltistan region
- Karimabad, Karachi, a neighborhood of Karachi, Sindh province
- Karimabad, Khyber Pakhtunkhwa, a town in Chitral District, Khyber Pakhtunkhwa province

== India ==
- Karimabad, Pulwama, a village in Pulwama district, Jammu and Kashmir

== See also ==
- Karimabad-e Olya (disambiguation)
- Karamabad (disambiguation)
- Karimpur (disambiguation)
