= Shadipur =

Shadipur may refer to the following places in India:

- Shadipur (Bhagalpur), a village in Warisnagar tehsil, Samastipur district, Bihar
- Shadipur, Bhulath, a village in Kapurthala district, Punjab
- Shadipur, Fatehgarh Sahib, a village in Sanghol, Khamono, Punjab
- Shadipur, Jalandhar, a village in Punjab
- Shadipur Depot, a residential and industrial area in West Delhi
  - Shadipur metro station, on the Blue Line of the Delhi Metro
