= Nogawan =

- town
- Location in Punjab, India
- Coordinates: 30.737°N 76.440°E
- Country: India
- State: Punjab

Languages
  - Official: Punjabi
- Time zone: UTC+5:30 (IST)

Nogawan is a small town in the Fatehgarh Sahib district, Punjab, India, which is located on Bassi-Morinda road, about 6 km from Bassi Pathana. It is a fast-growing town and proudly houses a Senior Secondary School, Petrol Pump, Gurudwara, Flour Mill, Post Office, Railway station, Telephone Exchange, Bus Stand, veterinary hospital and a Dispensary.

== Importance ==
This town serves as a transportation hub and shopping centre for various villages around it, like:

- Kishanpur
- Fatehpur Jattan
- Thablan
- Gandhuan Kalan
- Shadipur
- Alampur
- Rampur kaleran
- Wazidpur
- Karimpura
- Khantt

The main profession of people is Agriculture. The popular Bhakhra Canal runs just one km away from it, and a small tributary from this canal serves as irrigation needs of this town and surrounding villages.
