= Karamabad =

Karamabad (Persian: کرم آباد) may refer to:

- Karamabad, Golestan, a village in Minudasht County, Golestan Province, Iran
- Karamabad, Mirbag-e Shomali, a village in Mirbag-e Shomali Rural District, Central District, Delfan County, Lorestan Province, Iran
- Karamabad, Nurabad, a village in Nurabad Rural District, Central District, Delfan County, Lorestan Province, Iran
- Karamabad, Doab, a village in Doab Rural District, Central District, Selseleh County, Lorestan Province, Iran
- Karamabad, Qaleh-ye Mozaffari, a village in Qaleh-ye Mozaffari Rural District, Central District, Selseleh County, Lorestan Province, Iran
- Karamabad, Yusefvand, a village in Yusefvand Rural District, Central District, Selseleh County, Lorestan Province, Iran
- Karamabad, West Azerbaijan, a village in Gejlarat-e Gharbi Rural District, Aras District, Poldasht County, West Azerbaijan Province, Iran

== See also ==
- Karimabad (disambiguation)
