= Arababad =

Arababad (Persian: عرب اباد) may refer to:

== Iran ==
=== Alborz province ===
- Arababad-e Afshar Rural District, an administrative division of Chaharbagh County
- Arababad-e Khosravi, a village in Chaharbagh County
- Arababad, Alborz, a village in Savojbolagh County

=== Isfahan province ===
- Arababad, Semirom, alternative name for the village of Arabshah in Semirom County

=== Kerman province ===
- Arababad, Kerman, a village in Kerman County
- Arababad, Rafsanjan, a village in Rafsanjan County

=== Razavi Khorasan province ===
- Arababad, Dargaz, a village in Dargaz County

=== South Khorasan province ===
- Arababad, South Khorasan, a village in Tabas County
