= Karimabad-e Bala =

Karimabad-e Bala (Persian: كريم ابادبالا) may refer to:

- Karimabad-e Bala, Anbarabad
- Karimabad-e Bala, Rafsanjan

== See also ==
- Karimabad-e Olya (disambiguation)
