= Mahrinu =

Mahrinu ماهرينو
- Village
- Location within Iran
- Coordinates: 30°28′59″N 56°35′08″E
- Country: Iran
- Province: Kerman
- County: Kerman
- Bakhsh: Chatrud
- Rural District: Kavirat

Population (2006)
  - Total: 30
- Time zone: UTC+3:30 (IRST)
  - Summer (DST): UTC+4:30 (IRDT)

Mahrinu (Persian: ماهرينو, also Romanized as Māhrīnū; also known as Mārīnū) is a village in Kavirat Rural District, Chatrud District, Kerman County, Kerman Province, Iran. At the 2006 census, its population was 30, in 7 families.
