= Homqavand =

Homqavand همقاوند
- Village
- Location within Iran
- Coordinates: 30°36′19″N 57°04′12″E
- Country: Iran
- Province: Kerman
- County: Kerman
- Bakhsh: Chatrud
- Rural District: Moezziyeh

Population (2006)
  - Total: 84
- Time zone: UTC+3:30 (IRST)
  - Summer (DST): UTC+4:30 (IRDT)

Homqavand (Persian: همقاوند, also Romanized as Homqāvand and Hamqāvand) is a village in Moezziyeh Rural District, Chatrud District, Kerman County, Kerman Province, Iran. At the 2006 census, its population was 84, in 36 families.
