= Karimpur (disambiguation) =

Karimpur may refer to:

- Karimpur – a town in West Bengal, India
  - Karimpur I – a town quarter in Karimpur
  - Karimpur II – a town quarter in Karimpur
  - Karimpur (Vidhan Sabha constituency) – an assembly constituency in the Indian state of West Bengal
- Karimpur, Bangladesh – a village and union council in Bangladesh
- Karimpur, Ludhiana – a village in Punjab, India
- Karimpur, SBS Nagar – a village in Punjab, India

== See also ==
- Karimpura, a village in Punjab, India
- Karimabad (disambiguation)
