= Hojjatabad, Mahan =

Hojjatabad حجت‌آباد
- Village
- Location within Iran
- Coordinates: 30°04′29″N 57°05′22″E
- Country: Iran
- Province: Kerman
- County: Kerman
- Bakhsh: Mahan
- Rural District: Qanatghestan

Population (2006)
  - Total: 634
- Time zone: UTC+3:30 (IRST)
  - Summer (DST): UTC+4:30 (IRDT)

Hojjatabad (Persian: حجت‌آباد, also Romanized as Ḩojjatābād) is a village in Qanatghestan Rural District, Mahan District, Kerman County, Kerman Province, Iran. At the 2006 census, its population was 634, in 147 families.
