= Dasht-e Zahmatkeshan Industrial Area =

Dasht-e Zahmatkeshan دشت زحمتكشان
- Village
- Location within Iran
- Coordinates: 30°29′39″N 56°53′32″E
- Country: Iran
- Province: Kerman
- County: Kerman
- Bakhsh: Chatrud
- Rural District: Kavirat

Population (2006)
  - Total: 703
- Time zone: UTC+3:30 (IRST)
  - Summer (DST): UTC+4:30 (IRDT)

Dasht-e Zahmatkeshan (Persian: دشت زحمتكشان, also Romanized as Dasht-e Zaḩmatkeshān), literally "Plain of the Toilers", is an industrial area in Kavirat Rural District, Chatrud District, Kerman County, Kerman Province, Iran. At the 2006 census, its population was 703, in 118 families.

== Industrial Area ==
The area is home to lime kilns and brick factories.
