= Pasib =

Pasib پاسيب
- Village
- Location within Iran
- Coordinates: 30°34′09″N 57°06′43″E
- Country: Iran
- Province: Kerman
- County: Kerman
- Bakhsh: Chatrud
- Rural District: Moezziyeh

Population (2006)
  - Total: 86
- Time zone: UTC+3:30 (IRST)
  - Summer (DST): UTC+4:30 (IRDT)

Pasib (Persian: پاسيب, also Romanized as Pāsīb and Pā-ye Sīb; also known as Pāy Sīb) is a village in Moezziyeh Rural District, Chatrud District, Kerman County, Kerman Province, Iran. At the 2006 census, its population was 86, in 28 families.
