= Bibi Hayat =

Bibi Hayat بي بي حيات
- Village
- Location within Iran
- Coordinates: 30°28′43″N 56°36′22″E
- Country: Iran
- Province: Kerman
- County: Kerman
- Bakhsh: Chatrud
- Rural District: Kavirat

Population (2006)
  - Total: 228
- Time zone: UTC+3:30 (IRST)
  - Summer (DST): UTC+4:30 (IRDT)

Bibi Hayat (Persian: بي بي حيات, also Romanized as Bībī Ḩayāt and Bībī Haiāt) is a village in Kavirat Rural District, Chatrud District, Kerman County, Kerman Province, Iran. At the 2006 census, its population was 228, in 58 families.
