= Rughanuiyeh =

Rughanuiyeh روغنوئيه
- Village
- Location within Iran
- Coordinates: 29°55′44″N 57°20′24″E
- Country: Iran
- Province: Kerman
- County: Kerman
- Bakhsh: Mahan
- Rural District: Mahan

Population (2006)
  - Total: 17
- Time zone: UTC+3:30 (IRST)
  - Summer (DST): UTC+4:30 (IRDT)

Rughanuiyeh (Persian: روغنوئيه, also Romanized as Rūghanū’īyeh and Rowghanū’īyeh; also known as Rowghanū Bālā, Rowghanū-ye Bālā, and Rūghanū’īyeh-ye Bālā) is a village in Mahan Rural District, Mahan District, Kerman County, Kerman Province, Iran. At the 2006 census, its population was 17, in 6 families.
