= Sekonj =

Sekonj سكنج
- Village
- Location within Iran
- Coordinates: 29°59′46″N 57°25′22″E
- Country: Iran
- Province: Kerman
- County: Kerman
- Bakhsh: Mahan
- Rural District: Mahan

Population (2006)
  - Total: 443
- Time zone: UTC+3:30 (IRST)
  - Summer (DST): UTC+4:30 (IRDT)

Sekonj (Persian: سكنج; also known as Sagūch, Segach, Seh Gūsh, Seh Konj, and Sheykh ‘Alī Bābā) is a village in Mahan Rural District, Mahan District, Kerman County, Kerman Province, Iran. At the 2006 census, its population was 443, in 116 families.
