= Moezabad =

Moezabad معزاباد
- Village
- Location within Iran
- Coordinates: 30°36′47″N 56°58′51″E
- Country: Iran
- Province: Kerman
- County: Kerman
- Bakhsh: Chatrud
- Rural District: Moezziyeh

Population (2006)
  - Total: 683
- Time zone: UTC+3:30 (IRST)
  - Summer (DST): UTC+4:30 (IRDT)

Moezabad (Persian: معزاباد, also Romanized as Mo‘ezābād) is a village in Moezziyeh Rural District, Chatrud District, Kerman County, Kerman Province, Iran. At the 2006 census, its population was 683, in 170 families.
