= Gurchuiyeh =

Gurchuiyeh گورچوييه
- Village
- Location within Iran
- Coordinates: 30°40′13″N 56°48′52″E
- Country: Iran
- Province: Kerman
- County: Kerman
- Bakhsh: Chatrud
- Rural District: Kavirat

Population (2006)
  - Total: 539
- Time zone: UTC+3:30 (IRST)
  - Summer (DST): UTC+4:30 (IRDT)

Gurchuiyeh (Persian: گورچوييه, also Romanized as Gūrchū’īyeh and Goorchoo’eyeh; also known as Gūrchu and Qūrchū) is a village in Kavirat Rural District, Chatrud District, Kerman County, Kerman Province, Iran. At the 2006 census, its population was 539, in 128 families.
