= Fatehpur Jattan =

- village
- Location in Punjab, India Fatehpur Jattan (India)
- Coordinates: 30.752°N 76.432°E
- Country: India
- State: Punjab
- District: Fatehgarh Sahib

Area
  - Total: 12 km^{2} (4.6 sq mi)
- Elevation: 235 m (771 ft)

Population (2001)
  - Total: 828
  - Density: 69/km^{2} (180/sq mi)

Languages
  - Official: Punjabi
- Time zone: UTC+5:30 (IST)
- PIN: 140412
- Telephone code: 01763
- Vehicle registration: PB23 & PB52
- Nearest city: Bassi Pathana
- Sex ratio: 1.24 ♂/♀
- Literacy: 23%%
- Lok Sabha constituency: Fatehgarh Sahib
- Vidhan Sabha constituency: Bassi Pathana
- Climate: moderate (Köppen)

Fatehpur Jattan is a village in the Bassi Pathana block in Fatehgarh Sahib District in the Indian state of Punjab.

== Geography ==
The village is surrounded by the curvy bend of Bhakhra Canal, it is around 42 kilometres by road from Chandigarh-the capital of Punjab, 50 km from Patiala-academic city of Punjab, and about 68 km from Ludhiana-industrial city of Punjab. As a crow fly distance, it is just 32 km or 20 mile away from Chandigarh.

The Bhakhra canal covers East and South side of the village completely, thus blocking access from both sides. The nearest bridges to canal are at Doomchheri (4 km Northeast of village) and at Thablan (3 km Southwest of village).

The village has an area of around 570 acres, and other than some residential area, all of it is arable.

The village has its own Panchayat, own Gurudwara, an Islamic Mosque, a graveyard and two sikh Funeral sites.

== Demographics ==
As of 2001 it had a population of 828 in 127 households, and the main profession of people is agriculture only. The literacy rate is not very high, and very few people are in government jobs. The population mainly consists of Sikhs, followed by around 20 Muslim families. There used to be couple of Hindu families as well, but all of them recently migrated to cities for better financial prospects.

== Employment ==
Major population of village is farming community, heavily depending upon income from crops like wheat, paddy and sugarcane. Milk production is also secondary profession of many farmers, and a milk collection point is being operated by a cooperative society. A small number of people go out to nearby towns/cities for private and government jobs. A number of people also go to foreign countries like England, Switzerland, Canada etc to earn a livelihood.

== Religion ==
Most of the villagers are God-fearing religious people and believes in GOD, as supported by various worship places in the village. There is Gurudwara sahib in centre of the village where people of all religions go for fulfilling their wishes and near to it Baba Jeon Shah Ji Barote Wala (An annual assembly followed by Qawali takes place every year in June). On the south of village is a Kutia of a popular Sant baba Bhola Singh ji and near to it, a new mosque has been constructed recently. On western end is Baba Kadhe Shah Morh wala, and on Eastern side is Babe Shaheed.

== Transport ==
The nearest bus station and railway station is at Nogawan, nearest Senior Secondary schools are at Khantmanpur and Nogawan, nearest towns are Morinda, Sanghol(Ucha Pind), Khamanon and Bassi Pathana. Recently, Fatehpur has been well connected to neighbouring villages Shadipur, Panjkoha and Gandhuan Kalan by roads. Recently, the number of vehicles owned privately has increased significantly, and most of the village people are using private vehicles for local transport.

== Education ==
The village houses a government middle school which has been recently upgraded from primary school. Now due to better transport system and increased density of private schools, many children are attending private schools in nearby cities. Some of educated people are Master Ajmer Singh (Retd.), Sohan Singh (Retd.Govt Emp.), Shamsher Khan, Rana Khan, Mohna Khan, Dilbar Khan, Rupinder Singh, Late Master Amar Singh .

The dropout rate for education is quite high. People have to travel at least 3–5 miles for attending higher education, and have to go to major cities like Patiala or Chandigarh in order to get degree education.
