= Deh-e Masud =

Deh-e Masud ده مسعود
- Village
- Location within Iran
- Coordinates: 30°36′21″N 56°58′13″E
- Country: Iran
- Province: Kerman
- County: Kerman
- Bakhsh: Chatrud
- Rural District: Moezziyeh

Population (2006)
  - Total: 21
- Time zone: UTC+3:30 (IRST)
  - Summer (DST): UTC+4:30 (IRDT)

Deh-e Masud (Persian: ده مسعود, also Romanized as Deh-e Mas‘ūd; also known as Deh-e Mas‘ūdābād) is a village in Moezziyeh Rural District, Chatrud District, Kerman County, Kerman Province, Iran. At the 2006 census, its population was 21, in 7 families.
