= Tikdar, Kerman =

Tikdar تيكدر
- Village
- Location within Iran
- Coordinates: 30°40′34″N 56°52′48″E
- Country: Iran
- Province: Kerman
- County: Kerman
- Bakhsh: Chatrud
- Rural District: Kavirat

Population (2006)
  - Total: 469
- Time zone: UTC+3:30 (IRST)
  - Summer (DST): UTC+4:30 (IRDT)
- Website: http://www.tikdar.ir/

Tikdar (Persian: تيكدر, also Romanized as Tīkdar; also known as Tidar, Tīdar-e Deh Zīār, Tīgdar, and Tikdar Deh Ziyar) is a village in Kavirat Rural District, Chatrud District, Kerman County, Kerman Province, Iran. At the 2006 census, its population was 469, in 116 families.
