= Esmailabad, Mahan =

Esmailabad اسماعيل اباد
- Village
- Location within Iran
- Coordinates: 30°04′50″N 57°06′05″E
- Country: Iran
- Province: Kerman
- County: Kerman
- Bakhsh: Mahan
- Rural District: Qanatghestan

Population (2006)
  - Total: 591
- Time zone: UTC+3:30 (IRST)
  - Summer (DST): UTC+4:30 (IRDT)

Esmailabad (Persian: اسماعيل اباد, also Romanized as Esmā‘īlābād) is a village in Qanatghestan Rural District, Mahan District, Kerman County, Kerman Province, Iran. At the 2006 census, its population was 591, in 149 families.
