= Deh-e Khan =

Deh-e Khan or Deh Khan (Persian: ده خان) may refer to:

- Deh-e Khan, Chatrud
- Deh Khan, Shahdad
