= Deh-e Ziar =

Deh-e Ziar ده زيار
- Village
- Location within Iran
- Coordinates: 30°37′37″N 56°54′07″E
- Country: Iran
- Province: Kerman
- County: Kerman
- Bakhsh: Chatrud
- Rural District: Kavirat

Population (2006)
  - Total: 2,224
- Time zone: UTC+3:30 (IRST)
  - Summer (DST): UTC+4:30 (IRDT)

Deh-e Ziar (Persian: ده زيار, also Romanized as Deh-e Zīār, Deh Zeyār, and Deh Zīār; also known as Deh Yār) is a village in Kavirat Rural District, Chatrud District, Kerman County, Kerman Province, Iran. At the 2006 census, its population was 2,224, in 574 families.
