= Hajguiyeh =

Hajguiyeh هجگوئيه
- Village
- Location within Iran
- Coordinates: 30°33′02″N 56°31′36″E
- Country: Iran
- Province: Kerman
- County: Kerman
- Bakhsh: Chatrud
- Rural District: Kavirat

Population (2006)
  - Total: 44
- Time zone: UTC+3:30 (IRST)
  - Summer (DST): UTC+4:30 (IRDT)

Hajguiyeh (Persian: هجگوئيه, also Romanized as Hajgū’īyeh and Hajgūeeyeh; also known as Ajgū’īyeh) is a village in Kavirat Rural District, Chatrud District, Kerman County, Kerman Province, Iran. At the 2006 census, its population was 44, in 11 families.
