= Deh-e Morghu =

Deh-e Morghu ده مرغو
- Village
- Location within Iran
- Coordinates: 30°41′00″N 56°44′00″E
- Country: Iran
- Province: Kerman
- County: Kerman
- Bakhsh: Chatrud
- Rural District: Kavirat

Population (2006)
  - Total: 34
- Time zone: UTC+3:30 (IRST)
  - Summer (DST): UTC+4:30 (IRDT)

Deh-e Morghu (Persian: ده مرغو, also Romanized as Deh-e Morghū; also known as Marghu, Marghū Kharābeh, and Mārkū) is a village in Kavirat Rural District, Chatrud District, Kerman County, Kerman Province, Iran. At the 2006 census, its population was 34, in 7 families.
