= Karimabad-e Gavkhaneh =

Karimabad-e Gavkhaneh كريم ابادگاوخانه
- Village
- Location within Iran
- Coordinates: 30°31′46″N 56°47′48″E
- Country: Iran
- Province: Kerman
- County: Kerman
- Bakhsh: Chatrud
- Rural District: Kavirat

Population (2006)
  - Total: 42
- Time zone: UTC+3:30 (IRST)
  - Summer (DST): UTC+4:30 (IRDT)

Karimabad-e Gavkhaneh (Persian: كريم ابادگاوخانه, also Romanized as Karīmābād-e Gāvkhāneh; also known as Karīmābād) is a village in Kavirat Rural District, Chatrud District, Kerman County, Kerman Province, Iran. At the 2006 census, its population was 42, in 9 families.
