= Qanatghestan =

Village in Kerman province, Iran

Qanatghestan Persian: قناتغستان
- Village
- Location within Iran
- Coordinates: 30°04′43″N 57°14′00″E
- Country: Iran
- Province: Kerman
- County: Kerman
- District: Mahan
- Rural District: Qanatghestan

Population (2016)
  - Total: 1,147
- Time zone: UTC+3:30 (IRST)

Qanatghestan (Persian: قناتغستان) (Note: Also romanized as Qanāt-e-Ghestan and Qanātghestān; also known as Kanakistān and Qalāt Ghestān) is a village in, and the former capital of, Qanatghestan Rural District of Mahan District, Kerman County, Kerman province, Iran. The capital has been transferred to the city of Mohiabad.

== Demographics ==
=== Population ===
At the time of the 2006 National Census, the village's population was 902 in 249 households. The following census in 2011 counted 1,083 people in 303 households. The 2016 census measured the population of the village as 1,147 people in 338 households. It was the most populous village in its rural district.
