= Karimabad-e Hajj Ali =

Karimabad-e Hajj Ali كريم ابادحاج علي
- Village
- Location within Iran
- Coordinates: 29°49′47″N 57°25′02″E
- Country: Iran
- Province: Kerman
- County: Kerman
- Bakhsh: Mahan
- Rural District: Mahan

Population (2006)
  - Total: 29
- Time zone: UTC+3:30 (IRST)
  - Summer (DST): UTC+4:30 (IRDT)

Karimabad-e Hajj Ali (Persian: كريم ابادحاج علي, also Romanized as Karīmābād-e Ḩājj ‘Alī; also known as Karīmābād-e Ḩājī ‘Alī and Karīmābād-e Ḩājjī ‘Alī) is a village in Mahan Rural District, Mahan District, Kerman County, Kerman Province, Iran. At the 2006 census, its population was 29, in 7 families.
