= Karimabad-e Abnil =

Karimabad-e Abnil كريم اباداب نيل
- Village
- Location within Iran
- Coordinates: 30°35′04″N 56°44′29″E
- Country: Iran
- Province: Kerman
- County: Kerman
- Bakhsh: Chatrud
- Rural District: Kavirat

Population (2016)
  - Total: 960
- Time zone: UTC+3:30 (IRST)
  - Summer (DST): UTC+4:30 (IRDT)

Karimabad-e Abnil (Persian: كريم اباداب نيل, also Romanized as Karīmābād-e Ābnīl; also known as Karīmābād and Karīmābād-e Nīl) is a village in Kavirat Rural District, Chatrud District, Kerman County, Kerman Province, Iran. At the 2006 census, its population was 311, in 74 families.
