= Dehqan, Iran =

Dehqan (Persian: دهقان) may refer to:

- Dehqan, Kerman
- Dehqan, Khuzestan
