= Rahimabad, Chatrud =

Village in Kerman province, Iran

Rahimabad Persian: رحيم اباد
- Village
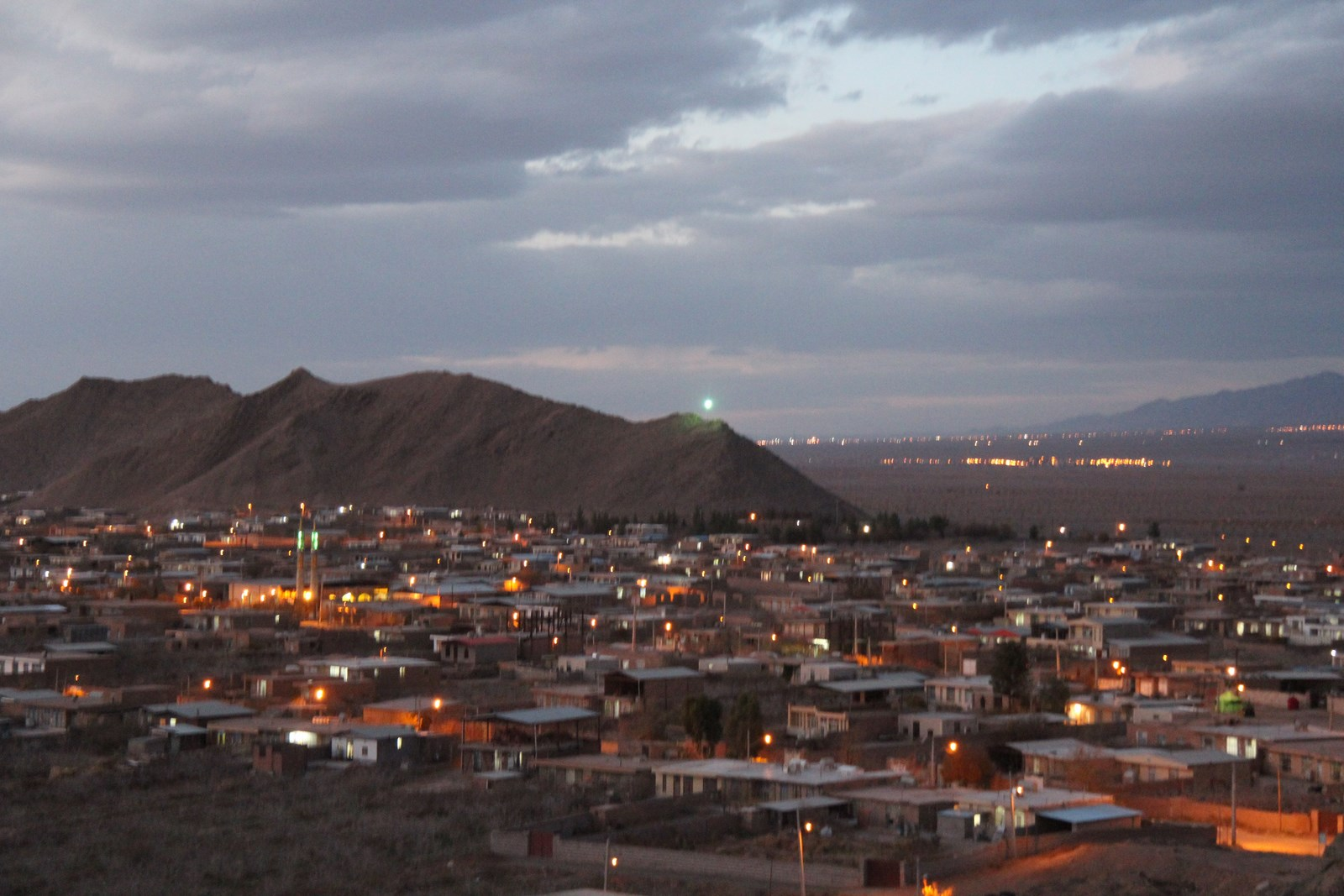
- The village of Rahimabad

- Location within Iran
- Coordinates: 30°35′35″N 56°48′10″E
- Country: Iran
- Province: Kerman
- County: Kerman
- District: Chatrud
- Rural District: Kavirat

Population (2016)
  - Total: 3,365
- Time zone: UTC+3:30 (IRST)

Rahimabad (Persian: رحيم اباد) (Note: Also romanized as Raḩīmābād) is a village in Kavirat Rural District of Chatrud District, Kerman County, Kerman province, Iran.

== Demographics ==
=== Population ===
At the time of the 2006 National Census, the village's population was 2,013 in 446 households. The following census in 2011 counted 2,352 people in 642 households. The 2016 census measured the population of the village as 3,365 people in 966 households. It was the most populous village in its rural district.

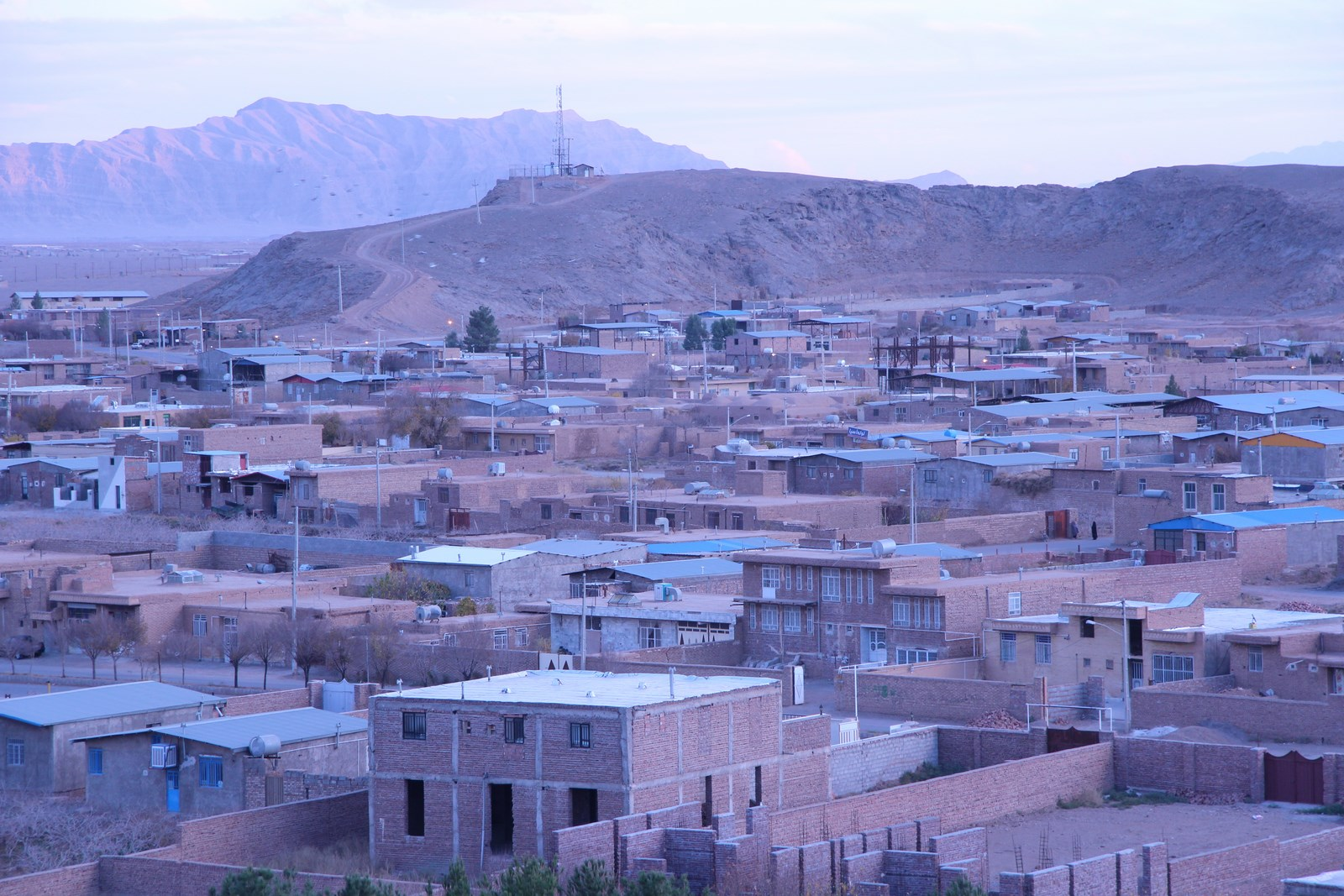
