= Dehghan =

Dehghan may refer to:

- Dehqan, class of land magnates in Iran
- Dehqan, Iran (disambiguation)
- Dehghan (surname)
