= Langar, Kerman =

Village in Kerman province, Iran

Langar Persian: لنگر
- Village
- Location within Iran
- Coordinates: 30°04′26″N 57°15′55″E
- Country: Iran
- Province: Kerman
- County: Kerman
- District: Mahan
- Rural District: Mahan

Population (2016)
  - Total: 1,818
- Time zone: UTC+3:30 (IRST)

Langar (Persian: لنگر) is a village in, and the capital of, Mahan Rural District of Mahan District, Kerman County, Kerman province, Iran.

== Demographics ==
=== Population ===
At the time of the 2006 National Census, the village's population was 2,312 in 575 households. The following census in 2011 counted 2,153 people in 612 households. The 2016 census measured the population of the village as 1,818 people in 532 households. It was the most populous village in its rural district.
