= Karimabad-e Olya =

Karimabad-e Olya (Persian: كريم ابادعليا) may refer to:

- Karimabad-e Olya, Anbarabad, Kerman Province
- Karimabad-e Olya, Rafsanjan, Kerman Province
- Karimabad-e Olya, North Khorasan

== See also ==
- Karimabad-e Bala (disambiguation)
