= Dehghani =

Dehghani in an Iranian surname. Notable people bearing surname include:

- Allahverdi Dehghani, Iranian politician
- Amrollah Dehghani, Iranian Paralympic powerlifter
- Ashraf Dehghani, Iranian communist and revolutionary
- Bahram Dehghani, Iranian film editor
- Fatemeh Dehghani, Iranian oud player and musician
- Habib Dehghani, Iranian footballer
- Hadi Dehghani, Iranian footballer
- Mahya Dehghani, Iranian actress
- Mohammad Dehghani, Iranian higher education administrator
- Reza Dehghani, Iranian footballer
- Ruhollah Dehghani Firouzabadi, Iranian scientist and Vice President of Iran

== See also ==
- Dehghan (surname)
