= Karimabad-e Sardar =

Karimabad-e Sardar كريم ابادسردار
- Village
- Location within Iran
- Coordinates: 29°53′24″N 57°27′36″E
- Country: Iran
- Province: Kerman
- County: Kerman
- Bakhsh: Mahan
- Rural District: Mahan

Population (2006)
  - Total: 13
- Time zone: UTC+3:30 (IRST)
  - Summer (DST): UTC+4:30 (IRDT)

Karimabad-e Sardar (Persian: كريم ابادسردار, also Romanized as Karīmābād-e Sardār) is a village in Mahan Rural District, Mahan District, Kerman County, Kerman Province, Iran. At the 2006 census, its population was 13, in 4 families.
