= Arababad, Kerman =

Arababad عرب اباد
- Village
- Location within Iran
- Coordinates: 29°55′17″N 57°30′18″E
- Country: Iran
- Province: Kerman
- County: Kerman
- Bakhsh: Mahan
- Rural District: Mahan

Population (2006)
  - Total: 185
- Time zone: UTC+3:30 (IRST)
  - Summer (DST): UTC+4:30 (IRDT)

Arababad (Persian: عرب اباد, also Romanized as ‘Arabābād) is a village in Mahan Rural District, Mahan District, Kerman County, Kerman Province, Iran. At the 2006 census, its population was 185, in 54 families.
