= Lutak =

Lutak may refer to:

- Lutak, Alaska, United States
- Lutak, Iran, a village in Kerman Province, Iran
- Lutak (surname), Rusyn, Slovak and Ukrainian surname.
