= Deh-e Khan, Chatrud =

Deh-e Khan ده خان
- Village
- Location within Iran
- Coordinates: 30°38′07″N 56°43′39″E
- Country: Iran
- Province: Kerman
- County: Kerman
- Bakhsh: Chatrud
- Rural District: Kavirat

Population (2006)
  - Total: 20
- Time zone: UTC+3:30 (IRST)
  - Summer (DST): UTC+4:30 (IRDT)

Deh-e Khan (Persian: ده خان, also Romanized as Deh-e Khān and Deh Khān; also known as Shahr Dān) is a village in Kavirat Rural District, Chatrud District, Kerman County, Kerman Province, Iran. At the 2006 census, its population was 20, in 4 families.
