= Lutak (surname) =

Lutak (Rusyn: Лутак, Slovak: Lutak, Ukrainian: Лутак, Hungarian: Luták) is a Rusyn, Slovak and Ukrainian surname.

== Meaning ==
Versions of Zakarpattia philologist Pavlo Chuchka:

1. From South Slavic ancestor's male name Luta using a suffix -ak as patronymic one. Luta is a variant of the official Serbo-Croatian names Milutin and Milun.
2. From the Serbian noun lutak- "doll"(masculine),"children's toy in the form of a man".
3. From Boyko or Old Polish measure of weight łut

== Origin ==
Probably, surname Lutak originated in the early 17th century in the northern regions of the Kingdom of Hungary, where the majority of the population were Rusyns, Slovaks, Croats, Vlachs and Serbs.

== The references in historical documents ==
For the first time in official documents surname Lutak is mentioned in historical Subcarpathian Rus in 1699 in Bereg Country - Lutak János and his son Vaszil 12-year-old from Nagy Ábránka (now Lokit, Irshava district, Zakarpattia Oblast, Ukraine). And in 1704 the same János Lutak is mentioned already as kuruc in Mukachevo list of Greek Catholics who participated in Rákóczi's War of Independence (1703-1711).

== Notable people ==
- Medveczkyné Luták Edit (born 1932), Soviet, Ukrainian and Hungarian artist of decorative and applied arts, painter, graphic artist.
- Ivan Kondratyevich Lutak (1919 — 2009), Soviet party leader, First Secretary the Cherkasy Regional Committee of the Communist Party of Ukraine.

== See also ==
- Lutak (disambiguation)
- HUNGARICANA. Archives, a common website of Hungarian archives, museums and libraries, operated by the Library of Parliament, Hungary.
