= Avtar Singh Karimpuri =

Indian politician

President of Bahujan Samaj Party Punjab Unit
- In office 2014–2016
- Preceded by: Parkash Singh Jandali
- Succeeded by: Rashpal Singh Raju

Member of the Rajya Sabha
- In office November 2008 – November 2014
- Constituency: Uttar Pradesh

MLA, Punjab
- In office 1992-1997
- Succeeded by: Sohan Singh Thandal
- Constituency: Mahilpur(SC)

Personal details
- Born: 16 April 1964 (age 62) Karimpur, SBS Nagar, Punjab, India
- Party: Bahujan Samaj Party
- Education: Annamalai University
- Occupation: Politician

Avtar Singh Karimpuri, is an Indian politician of the Bahujan Samaj Party (BSP) from Punjab. He is President of Bahujan Samaj Party Punjab Unit and is ex-Rajya Sabha member.

== See also ==
- Kanshi Ram
