= Jupar =

City in Kerman province, Iran

Jupar Persian: جوپار
- City
- Location within Iran
- Coordinates: 30°03′43″N 57°06′40″E
- Country: Iran
- Province: Kerman
- County: Kerman
- District: Mahan

Population (2016)
  - Total: 3,607
- Time zone: UTC+3:30 (IRST)

Jupar (Persian: جوپار) (Note: Also romanized as Jūpār) is a city in Mahan District of Kerman County, Kerman province, Iran.

== Demographics ==
=== Population ===
At the time of the 2006 National Census, the city's population was 3,830 in 1,054 households. The following census in 2011 counted 3,937 people in 1,189 households. The 2016 census measured the population of the city as 3,607 people in 1,153 households.
