= Kazemabad, Kerman =

City in Kerman province, Iran

Kazemabad Persian: كاظم آباد
- City
- Location within Iran
- Coordinates: 30°34′03″N 56°50′42″E
- Country: Iran
- Province: Kerman
- County: Kerman
- District: Chatrud

Population (2016)
  - Total: 4,060
- Time zone: UTC+3:30 (IRST)

Kazemabad (Persian: كاظم آباد) (Note: Also romanized as Kāz̧emābād and Kāzimābād; also known as Qāsemābād) is a city in Chatrud District of Kerman County, Kerman province, Iran, serving as the administrative center for Kavirat Rural District.

== Demographics ==
=== Population ===
At the time of the 2006 National Census, the city's population was 3,612 in 812 households. The following census in 2011 counted 3,645 people in 927 households. The 2016 census measured the population of the city as 4,060 people in 1,151 households.
