= Hutak, Kerman =

Village in Kerman province, Iran

Hutak Persian: هوتك
- Village
- Location within Iran
- Coordinates: 30°34′37″N 56°55′49″E
- Country: Iran
- Province: Kerman
- County: Kerman
- District: Chatrud
- Rural District: Moezziyeh

Population (2016)
  - Total: 3,415
- Time zone: UTC+3:30 (IRST)

Hutak (Persian: هوتك) (Note: Also romanized as Hūtak; also known as Huth, Hutk, and Lūtak) is a village in, and the capital of, Moezziyeh Rural District of Chatrud District, Kerman County, Kerman province, Iran.

== Demographics ==
=== Population ===
At the time of the 2006 National Census, the village's population was 3,021 in 777 households. The following census in 2011 counted 3,323 people in 940 households. The 2016 census measured the population of the village as 3,415 people in 1,087 households. It was the most populous village in its rural district.
