= Chatrud =

City in Kerman province, Iran

Chatrud Persian: چترود
- City
- Location within Iran
- Coordinates: 30°36′08″N 56°54′26″E
- Country: Iran
- Province: Kerman
- County: Kerman
- District: Chatrud

Population (2016)
  - Total: 5,860
- Time zone: UTC+3:30 (IRST)
- Website: www.chatrood.com

Chatrud (Persian: چترود) (Note: Also romanized as Chatrood, Chatroud, and Chatrūd) is a city in, and the capital of, Chatrud District of Kerman County, Kerman province, Iran.

== Demographics ==
=== Population ===
At the time of the 2006 National Census, the city's population was 5,660 in 1,378 households. The following census in 2011 counted 5,344 people in 1,450 households. The 2016 census measured the population of the city as 5,860 people in 1,730 households.
