= Dehghan (surname) =

Dehghan is an Iranian surname. Notable people with the surname include:

- Alireza Dehghan, Iranian weightlifter
- Zahra Dehghan, Iranian archer
- Saeed Kamali Dehghan, Iranian-British journalist
- Mohammad Dehghan, Iranian politician
- Mohammad Dehghan (futsal player), Iranian futsal coach and former player
- Hossein Dehghan, Iranian military officer
- Reza Dehghan, Iranian footballer
- Shaghayegh Dehghan, Iranian actress

== See also ==
- Dehghan (disambiguation)
- Dehghani
