= Nandpur Kalaur =

Nandpur Kalaur is a conurbation of two villages in Bassi Pathana Tehsil in Fatehgarh Sahib District in Punjab State in India. The two villages are administrated separately but are physically contiguous with the main demarcation between them being the Bassi Pathana Road which passes between them.

== History ==
Kalaur's exact origins are not known but it is considered one of the oldest villages in the area due to its size and also because there can be found remains of older settlements when digging underground.

Nandpur is a relatively much newer settlement, while its exact settlement date is not known, it is at least 300 years old as the village was already settled during the lifetime of Guru Tegh Bahadur, the 9th Guru of Sikhs. Guru Tegh Bahadur, while on his way to Delhi where he was eventually executed, stayed and rested in Nandpur. To commemorate this event, there was a Sikh Gurudwara located in Nandpur known as Bhora Sahib. In the 2000s, the Shiromani Gurdwara Parbandhak Committee, took control of the Gurudwara on basis of historical grounds. The old Gurudwara, which is now completely underground due to centuries of settlement around it, was closed up and a new Gurudwara commemorating Guru Tegh Bahadur was built beside it.

Nandpur receives its name from Nando Kaur, who was the daughter of a large Jat landowner in Kalaur. She was married to a farmer from the village Sujapur, located in Ludhiana district some 90 km to the west of Nandpur. While it is no longer known why, Nando and her husband and his extended family eventually moved and settled to the south of Kalaur and started farming Nando's fathers' lands. As a result, most of the Jatt residents of Nandpur have Hans ( ਹਾਂਸ, हांस) family name which is not found elsewhere in Fatehgarh Sahib but is common in Sujapur and surrounding area.

== Demographics ==
According to Census India 2011, Nandpur has a population of 2880 while Kalaur has a population of 2106. Even separately, Nandpur and Kalaur the 2nd and 3rd largest villages in Bassi Pathana Tehsil.

Nandpur & Kalaur are located 8.4 km from Bassi Pathana and 14.5 km from Fatehgarh Sahib. Chandigarh, the state capital of both Punjab and Haryana, is located only 27 km to the east.
