= Mohiabad =

City in Kerman province, Iran

Mohiabad Persian: محی‌آباد
- City
- Location within Iran
- Coordinates: 30°05′04″N 57°09′12″E
- Country: Iran
- Province: Kerman
- County: Kerman
- District: Mahan

Population (2016)
  - Total: 3,930
- Time zone: UTC+3:30 (IRST)

Mohiabad (Persian: محی‌آباد) (Note: Also romanized as Moḩīābād, Mohīābād, and Mohyābād; formerly Muhyiddinabad (محی‌الدین‌آباد), also romanized as Muhyiddin Abad) is a city in Mahan District of Kerman County, Kerman province, Iran, serving as the administrative center for Qanatghestan Rural District. The previous capital of the rural district was the village of Qanatghestan.

== Demographics ==
=== Population ===
At the time of the 2006 National Census, the city's population was 3,493 in 892 households. The following census in 2011 counted 3,719 people in 1,038 households. The 2016 census measured the population of the city as 3,930 people in 1,156 households.
