= Karimabad-e Kheybar =

Karimabad-e Kheybar كريم ابادخيبر
- Village
- Interactive map of Karimabad-e Kheybar
- Coordinates: 28°23′15″N 61°09′02″E
- Country: Iran
- Province: Sistan and Baluchestan
- County: Khash
- Bakhsh: Central
- Rural District: Esmailabad

Population (2006)
  - Total: 88
- Time zone: UTC+3:30 (IRST)
  - Summer (DST): UTC+4:30 (IRDT)

Karimabad-e Kheybar (Persian: كريم ابادخيبر, also Romanized as Karīmābād-e Kheybar) is a village in Esmailabad Rural District, in the Central District of Khash County, Sistan and Baluchestan Province, Iran. At the 2006 census, its population was 88, in 15 families.
