= Shadipur (Bhagalpur) =

Sadipur Bathnaha, is a Hindu village, under Warisnagar tehsil in the Samastipur district in the state of Bihar.
