= Karimabad Nurali =

Karimabad Nurali کريم آباد نورعلي
- Village
- Location within Iran
- Coordinates: 34°03′31″N 47°56′52″E
- Country: Iran
- Province: Lorestan
- County: Delfan
- Bakhsh: Central
- Rural District: Nurabad

Population (2006)
  - Total: 63
- Time zone: UTC+3:30 (IRST)
  - Summer (DST): UTC+4:30 (IRDT)

Karimabad Nurali (Persian: کريم آباد نورعلي, also Romanized as Karīmābād Nūrʿalī; also known as Karīmābād) is a village in Nurabad Rural District, in the Central District of Delfan County, Lorestan Province, Iran. At the 2006 census, its population was 63, in 15 families.
