= Cham Hashem-e Dehqan =

Cham Hashem-e Dehqan چم هاشم دهقان
- Village
- Location within Iran
- Coordinates: 31°06′42″N 49°36′30″E
- Country: Iran
- Province: Khuzestan
- County: Ramhormoz
- Bakhsh: Central
- Rural District: Soltanabad

Population (2006)
  - Total: 137
- Time zone: UTC+3:30 (IRST)
  - Summer (DST): UTC+4:30 (IRDT)

Cham Hashem-e Dehqan (Persian: چم هاشم دهقان, also Romanized as Cham Hāshem-e Dehqān; also known as Cham Hāshem-e Qal‘eh Dehqān and Dehqān) is a village in Soltanabad Rural District, in the Central District of Ramhormoz County, Khuzestan Province, Iran. At the 2006 census, its population was 137, in 28 families.
