= Karimabad-e Deh Tajgi =

Karimabad-e Deh Tajgi كريم ابادده تجگي
- village
- Location within Iran
- Coordinates: 28°31′51″N 60°53′53″E
- Country: Iran
- Province: Sistan and Baluchestan
- County: Khash
- Bakhsh: Nukabad
- Rural District: Eskelabad

Population (2006)
  - Total: 152
- Time zone: UTC+3:30 (IRST)
  - Summer (DST): UTC+4:30 (IRDT)

Karimabad-e Deh Tajgi (Persian: كريم ابادده تجگي, also Romanized as Karīmābād-e Deh Tajgī; also known as Karīmābād) is a village in Eskelabad Rural District, Nukabad District, Khash County, Sistan and Baluchestan Province, Iran.

At the 2006 census, its population was 152, in 30 families.
