= Fatemeh Dehghani =

Iranian barbat and oud player

Fatemeh Dehghani فاطمه دهقانی
- Also known as: فاطمه دهقانی, Faţemeh Deqani (alternative transliteration)
- Born: 13 February 1996 (age 30); Tehran, Iran
- Genre: Persian traditional music
- Occupations: Composer, instrumentalist, music teacher
- Instrument: oud
- Years active: 2006–present
- Label: Javan Records
- Website: fatemehdehghani.com

Fatemeh Dehghani (Persian: فاطمه دهقانی) (born 1996, Tehran) is an Iranian oud player, best known for her trio music of Iranian folk music and Persian classical music with Sara Hasti (kemenche) and Farideh Sarsangi (percussion and santur). She is a musician, music teacher and campaigner against sexism in music.

== Discography ==
- The Spirit Afar (2020)
- The Waterfall Flowing From Your Hair (2022)
- In My Dreams I See You (2025)
