= Karimabad-e Posht-e Dig =

Karimabad-e Posht-e Dig كريم ابادپشت ديگ
- Village
- Interactive map of Karimabad-e Posht-e Dig
- Country: Iran
- Province: Kerman
- County: Rigan
- Bakhsh: Central
- Rural District: Rigan

Population (2006)
  - Total: 43
- Time zone: UTC+3:30 (IRST)
  - Summer (DST): UTC+4:30 (IRDT)

Karimabad-e Posht-e Dig (Persian: كريم ابادپشت ديگ, also Romanized as Karīmābād-e Posht-e Dīg) is a village in Rigan Rural District, in the Central District of Rigan County, Kerman Province, Iran. At the 2006 census, its population was 43, in 12 families.
