= Karimabad-e Ansari =

Karimabad-e Ansari كريم ابادانصاري
- Village
- Location within Iran
- Coordinates: 28°54′34″N 58°51′22″E
- Country: Iran
- Province: Kerman
- County: Fahraj
- Bakhsh: Central
- Rural District: Fahraj

Population (2006)
  - Total: 562
- Time zone: UTC+3:30 (IRST)
  - Summer (DST): UTC+4:30 (IRDT)

Karimabad-e Ansari (Persian: كريم ابادانصاري, also Romanized as Karīmābād-e Anşārī and Karīmābād Anşārī; also known as Karīmābād) is a village in Fahraj Rural District, in the Central District of Fahraj County, Kerman Province, Iran. At the 2006 census, its population was 562, in 123 families.
