= Karimabad-e Ayaghchi =

Karimabad-e Ayaghchi كريم آباد اياغچي
- Village
- Location within Iran
- Coordinates: 36°20′24″N 46°45′55″E
- Country: Iran
- Province: Kurdistan
- County: Saqqez
- Bakhsh: Ziviyeh
- Rural District: Gol Tappeh

Population (2006)
  - Total: 118
- Time zone: UTC+3:30 (IRST)
  - Summer (DST): UTC+4:30 (IRDT)

Karimabad-e Ayaghchi (Persian: كريم آباد اياغچي, also Romanized as Karīmābād-e Ayāghchī; also known as Karīmābād) is a village in Gol Tappeh Rural District, Ziviyeh District, Saqqez County, Kurdistan Province, Iran. At the 2006 census, its population was 118, in 30 families. The village is populated by Kurds.
