= Karimabad, Meyaneh =

Karimabad كريم اباد
- Village
- Location within Iran
- Coordinates: 37°17′01″N 47°20′44″E
- Country: Iran
- Province: East Azerbaijan
- County: Meyaneh
- Bakhsh: Central
- Rural District: Kolah Boz-e Gharbi

Population (2006)
  - Total: 34
- Time zone: UTC+3:30 (IRST)
  - Summer (DST): UTC+4:30 (IRDT)

Karimabad (Persian: كريم اباد, also Romanized as Karīmābād) is a village in Kolah Boz-e Gharbi Rural District, in the Central District of Meyaneh County, East Azerbaijan Province, Iran. At the 2006 census, its population was 34, in 7 families.
