= Karamabad Haq Nader =

Karamabad Haq Nader كرم اباد حق ندر
- Village
- Country: Iran
- Province: Lorestan
- County: Selseleh
- Bakhsh: Central
- Rural District: Yusefvand

Population (2006)
  - Total: 202
- Time zone: UTC+3:30 (IRST)
  - Summer (DST): UTC+4:30 (IRDT)

Karamabad Haq Nader (Persian: كرم اباد حق ندر, also Romanized as Karamābād Haq Nader) is a village in Yusefvand Rural District, in the Central District of Selseleh County, Lorestan Province, Iran. At the 2006 census, its population was 202, in 44 families.
