= Karimpur, SBS Nagar =

Karimpur
- Village
- Location in Punjab, India Karimpur (India)
- Coordinates: 31.0897563°N 76.1481017°E
- Country: India
- State: Punjab
- District: Shaheed Bhagat Singh Nagar

Government
  - Type: Panchayat raj
  - Body: Gram panchayat
- Elevation: 355 m (1,165 ft)

Population (2011)
  - Total: 1,180
- Sex ratio 594/586 ♂/♀

Languages
  - Official: Punjabi
- Time zone: UTC+5:30 (IST)
- PIN: 144516
- Telephone code: 01823
- ISO 3166 code: IN-PB
- Post office: Langroya
- Website: nawanshahr.nic.in

Karimpur is a village in Shaheed Bhagat Singh Nagar district of Punjab State, India. It is located 2.7 kilometres (1.7 mi) away from postal head office Langroya, 6.4 kilometres (4.0 mi) from Nawanshahr, 13 kilometres (8.1 mi) from district headquarter Shaheed Bhagat Singh Nagar and 87 kilometres (54 mi) from state capital Chandigarh. The village is administrated by Sarpanch an elected representative of the village.

== Demography ==
As of 2011, Karimpur has a total number of 250 houses and population of 1180 of which 594 include are males while 586 are females according to the report published by Census India in 2011. The literacy rate of Karimpur is 81.33% higher than the state average of 75.84%. The population of children under the age of 6 years is 109 which is 9.24% of total population of Karimpur, and child sex ratio is approximately 1137 as compared to Punjab state average of 846.

Most of the people are from Schedule Caste which constitutes 72.46% of total population in Karimpur. The town does not have any Schedule Tribe population so far.

As per the report published by Census India in 2011, 405 people were engaged in work activities out of the total population of Karimpur which includes 305 males and 100 females. According to census survey report 2011, 87.41% workers describe their work as main work and 12.59% workers are involved in Marginal activity providing livelihood for less than 6 months.

== Education ==
The village has a Punjabi medium, co-ed upper primary school established in 2001. The school provide mid-day meal as per Indian Midday Meal Scheme. As per Right of Children to Free and Compulsory Education Act the school provide free education to children between the ages of 6 and 14.

KC Engineering College and Doaba Khalsa Trust Group Of Institutions are the nearest colleges. Industrial Training Institute for women (ITI Nawanshahr) is 4.3 kilometres (2.7 mi). The village is 68 kilometres (42 mi) away from Chandigarh University, 45 kilometres (28 mi) from Indian Institute of Technology and 50 kilometres (31 mi) away from Lovely Professional University.

List of schools nearby:

- Dashmesh Model School, Kahma
- Govt Primary School, Kahlon
- Govt High School, Garcha

== Transport ==
Nawanshahr railway station is the nearest train station however, Garhshankar Junction railway station is 17.4 kilometres (10.8 mi) away from the village. Sahnewal Airport is the nearest domestic airport which located 56 kilometres (35 mi) away in Ludhiana and the nearest international airport is located in Chandigarh also Sri Guru Ram Dass Jee International Airport is the second nearest airport which is 159 kilometres (99 mi) away in Amritsar.

== See also ==
- Avtar Singh Karimpuri
- List of villages in India
