= Arababad, Rafsanjan =

Arababad عرب اباد
- Village
- Location within Iran
- Coordinates: 30°24′19″N 56°05′37″E
- Country: Iran
- Province: Kerman
- County: Rafsanjan
- Bakhsh: Central
- Rural District: Qasemabad

Population (2006)
  - Total: 953
- Time zone: UTC+3:30 (IRST)
  - Summer (DST): UTC+4:30 (IRDT)

Arababad (Persian: عرب اباد, also Romanized as ‘Arabābād; also known as ‘Arbābābād) is a village in Qasemabad Rural District, in the Central District of Rafsanjan County, Kerman Province, Iran. At the 2006 census, its population was 953, in 234 families.
