= Karimabad, Saqqez =

Karimabad كريم آباد
- Village
- Location within Iran
- Coordinates: 36°13′46″N 46°34′04″E
- Country: Iran
- Province: Kurdistan
- County: Saqqez
- Bakhsh: Ziviyeh
- Rural District: Saheb

Population (2006)
  - Total: 379
- Time zone: UTC+3:30 (IRST)
  - Summer (DST): UTC+4:30 (IRDT)

The Kurdish village of Karimabad Saqqez, also known as Karimabad Anushiravani or Karimabad Qader Khan, is one of the important and historical villages near the city of Saqqez. This village is also famous as Karimabad Feizollah Beigi due to the residence of the Khans of the great Feizollah Beigi tribe. One of the most notable and distinguished figures of this village is "Mamosta Seyed Bahauddin Ghaffari", who was a prominent scholar and leader of his time.

Karimabad (Persian: كريم آباد, also Romanized as Karīmābād) is a village in Saheb Rural District, Ziviyeh District, Saqqez County, Kurdistan Province, Iran. At the 2006 census, its population was 379, in 75 families. The village is populated by Kurds.
