= Karimabad-e Muqufeh =

Karimabad-e Muqufeh كريم ابادموقوفه
- Village
- Location within Iran
- Coordinates: 35°31′38″N 51°20′26″E
- Country: Iran
- Province: Tehran
- County: Rey
- Bakhsh: Kahrizak
- Rural District: Kahrizak

Population (2006)
  - Total: 464
- Time zone: UTC+3:30 (IRST)
  - Summer (DST): UTC+4:30 (IRDT)

Karimabad-e Muqufeh (Persian: كريم ابادموقوفه, also Romanized as Karīmābād-e Mūqūfeh; also known as Karīmābād) is a village in Kahrizak Rural District, Kahrizak District, Ray County, Tehran Province, Iran. At the 2006 census, its population was 464, in 103 families.
