= Karimpura =

- Village
- Location in Punjab, India Karimpura (India)
- Coordinates: 30.7232°N 76.4528°E
- Country: India
- State: Punjab
- District: Fatehgarh Sahib

Population
  - Total: 185

Languages
  - Official: Punjabi
- Time zone: UTC+5:30 (IST)

Karimpura is a village in Fatehgarh Sahib district, Punjab, India. There are about 30 to 35 households in the village. It is 7 kilometres (4.3 mi) from Bassi Pathana and 14 kilometres (8.7 mi) from Fatehgarh Sahib.

The village has a primary school, veterinary hospital, dairy plant, gym, volleyball court, and other sports activities. The gotras of Jatts in the village are Virk, Cheema, Gill, Dhindsa, Bajwa and Sandhu. It is connected through a wide road to the Morinda – Sirhind highway. This village has a 24 hour electricity connection and most of the houses have internet connection with WiFi. The roads of this village has street lights where as no other village in Punjab has street lights.Village of former Chairman, Jagjit Singh Virk.
