= Karimabad-e Hajji Karim =

Karimabad-e Hajji Karim كريم اباد حاجي كريم
- Village
- Location within Iran
- Coordinates: 28°38′30″N 60°25′13″E
- Country: Iran
- Province: Sistan and Baluchestan
- County: Khash
- Bakhsh: Nukabad
- Rural District: Gowhar Kuh

Population (2006)
  - Total: 36
- Time zone: UTC+3:30 (IRST)
  - Summer (DST): UTC+4:30 (IRDT)

Karimabad-e Hajji Karim (Persian: كريم اباد حاجي كريم, also Romanized as Karīmābād-e Ḩājjī Karīm; also known as Karīmābād) is a village in Gowhar Kuh Rural District, Nukabad District, Khash County, Sistan and Baluchestan Province, Iran. At the 2006 census, its population was 36, in 7 families.
