= Karimabad-e Suis =

Karimabad-e Suis كريم ابادسويس
- Village
- Location within Iran
- Coordinates: 36°08′27″N 58°48′22″E
- Country: Iran
- Province: Razavi Khorasan
- County: Nishapur
- Bakhsh: Central
- Rural District: Darbqazi

Population (2006)
  - Total: 19
- Time zone: UTC+3:30 (IRST)
  - Summer (DST): UTC+4:30 (IRDT)

Karimabad-e Suis (Persian: كريم ابادسويس, also Romanized as Karīmābād-e Sūīs; also known as Karīmābād-e Moţlaq) is a village in Darbqazi Rural District, in the Central District of Nishapur County, Razavi Khorasan Province, Iran. At the 2006 census, its population was 19, in 4 families.
