= Karimabad, Masjed Soleyman =

Karimabad كريم اباد
- Village
- Location within Iran
- Coordinates: 32°02′33″N 49°20′41″E
- Country: Iran
- Province: Khuzestan
- County: Masjed Soleyman
- Bakhsh: Golgir
- Rural District: Tolbozan

Population (2006)
  - Total: 62
- Time zone: UTC+3:30 (IRST)
  - Summer (DST): UTC+4:30 (IRDT)

Karimabad (Persian: كريم اباد, also Romanized as Karīmābād; also known as Karīmābād-e Barneshāndeh) is a village in Tolbozan Rural District, Golgir District, Masjed Soleyman County, Khuzestan Province, Iran. At the 2006 census, its population was 62, in 15 families.
