= Karimabad, Chabahar =

Karimabad کريم آباد
- Village
- Country: Iran
- Province: Sistan and Baluchestan
- County: Chabahar
- Bakhsh: Dashtiari
- Rural District: Negur

Population (2006)
  - Total: 56
- Time zone: UTC+3:30 (IRST)
  - Summer (DST): UTC+4:30 (IRDT)

Karimabad (Persian: کريم آباد, also Romanized as Karīmābād) is a village in Negur Rural District, Dashtiari District, Chabahar County, Sistan and Baluchestan Province, Iran. At the 2006 census, its population was 56, in 11 families.
