= Sorkh Qaleh-ye Kordha =

Sorkh Qaleh-ye Kordha سرخ قلعه كردها
- Village
- Location within Iran
- Coordinates: 37°11′06″N 57°47′45″E
- Country: Iran
- Province: North Khorasan
- County: Esfarayen
- Bakhsh: Central
- Rural District: Milanlu

Population (2006)
  - Total: 106
- Time zone: UTC+3:30 (IRST)
  - Summer (DST): UTC+4:30 (IRDT)

Sorkh Qaleh-ye Kordha (Persian: سرخ قلعه كردها, also Romanized as Sorkh Qal‘eh-ye Kordhā; also known as Karīmābād-e Soflá) is a village in Milanlu Rural District, in the Central District of Esfarayen County, North Khorasan Province, Iran. At the 2006 census, its population was 106, in 27 families.
