= Tazehabad-e Karimabad =

Tazehabad-e Karimabad تازه آباد كريم آباد
- Village
- Location within Iran
- Coordinates: 35°12′00″N 47°48′00″E
- Country: Iran
- Province: Kurdistan
- County: Qorveh
- Bakhsh: Central
- Rural District: Panjeh Ali

Population (2006)
  - Total: 123
- Time zone: UTC+3:30 (IRST)
  - Summer (DST): UTC+4:30 (IRDT)

Tazehabad-e Karimabad (Persian: تازه آباد كريم آباد, also Romanized as Tāzehābād-e Karīmābād; also known as Karīmābād) is a village in Panjeh Ali Rural District, in the Central District of Qorveh County, Kurdistan Province, Iran. At the 2006 census, its population was 123, in 23 families. The village is populated by Kurds.
