= Karimabad, Mehriz =

Karimabad كريم اباد
- Village
- Location within Iran
- Coordinates: 31°18′13″N 54°56′29″E
- Country: Iran
- Province: Yazd
- County: Mehriz
- Bakhsh: Central
- Rural District: Bahadoran

Population (2006)
  - Total: 1,119
- Time zone: UTC+3:30 (IRST)
  - Summer (DST): UTC+4:30 (IRDT)

Karimabad (Persian: كريم اباد, also Romanized as Karīmābād) is a village in Bahadoran Rural District, in the Central District of Mehriz County, Yazd Province, Iran. At the 2006 census, its population was 1,119, in 273 families.
