= Qarajeh, Meyaneh =

Qarajeh قراجه
- Village
- Location within Iran
- Coordinates: 37°18′30″N 47°39′37″E
- Country: Iran
- Province: East Azerbaijan
- County: Meyaneh
- Bakhsh: Central
- Rural District: Kolah Boz-e Sharqi

Population (2006)
  - Total: 335
- Time zone: UTC+3:30 (IRST)
  - Summer (DST): UTC+4:30 (IRDT)

Qarajeh (Persian: قراجه, also Romanized as Qarājeh; also known as Karahjah and Karīmābād) is a village in Kolah Boz-e Sharqi Rural District, in the Central District of Meyaneh County, East Azerbaijan Province, Iran. At the 2006 census, its population was 335, in 70 families.
