= Karimabad, Pulwama =

Karimabad Madan
- Village
- Location in Jammu and Kashmir, India
- Coordinates: 33.8941014°N 74.8750509°E
- Country: India
- Union territory: Jammu and Kashmir
- District: Pulwama

Area
  - Total: 1.157 km^{2} (0.447 sq mi)

Population (2011)
  - Total: 3,565
  - Density: 3,081/km^{2} (7,980/sq mi)

Languages
  - Official: Kashmiri, Urdu, Hindi, Dogri, English
- Time zone: UTC+5:30 (IST)
- PIN: 192301
- Literacy: 64.77%

Karimabad, also known as Madan, is a village located in Pulwama tehsil, with its district administrative headquarters in Pulwama district of Jammu and Kashmir, India. It is situated 4 km towards North from Pulwama town, around 10 km from Kakapora towards South and 27.5 km from Sheikh ul-Alam International Airport Srinagar via NH444.

== History ==
The history of Karimabad village dates back to 200 years ago when it was known as "Madan", later renamed to Karimabad. The name Madan indicates that it has some relevance to Karim Dada who lived more than 100 years in Karimabad village.

== Population ==
According to survey data collected during the 2011 Census of India, Karimabad village has 581 households with a total population of 3565, out of which 1814 are male while 1751 are female.

== Controversy ==
After Burhan Wani's encounter, Karimabad village became famous across the valley in terms of Shahada and "surrender". Local people claimed that military personnel, Jammu and Kashmir Police and Central Reserve Police Force carried out a joint operation in the village, on 11 September 2017, which resulted in the security forces who entered the village destroying property, beating people up and arresting local youth under the "Public Safety. Act, 1978," and resorting to tear gassing the inhabitants.
