= Karimabad, Kohgiluyeh and Boyer-Ahmad =

Karimabad كريم اباد
- Village
- Location within Iran
- Coordinates: 30°37′55″N 51°34′24″E
- Country: Iran
- Province: Kohgiluyeh and Boyer-Ahmad
- County: Boyer-Ahmad
- Bakhsh: Central
- Rural District: Sarrud-e Jonubi

Population (2006)
  - Total: 313
- Time zone: UTC+3:30 (IRST)
  - Summer (DST): UTC+4:30 (IRDT)

Karimabad (Persian: كريم اباد, also romanized as Karīmābād) is a village in Sarrud-e Jonubi Rural District, in the Central District of Boyer-Ahmad County, Kohgiluyeh and Boyer-Ahmad Province, Iran. In the 2006 census, its population was 313 persons, distributed in 60 families.
