= Karimabad-e Ali Verdi =

Karimabad-e Ali Verdi كريم آباد علي وردي
- Village
- Location within Iran
- Coordinates: 35°21′46″N 47°37′04″E
- Country: Iran
- Province: Kurdistan
- County: Qorveh
- Bakhsh: Serishabad
- Rural District: Yalghuz Aghaj

Population (2006)
  - Total: 274
- Time zone: UTC+3:30 (IRST)
  - Summer (DST): UTC+4:30 (IRDT)

Karimabad-e Ali Verdi (Persian: كريم آباد علي وردي, also Romanized as Karīmābād-e ‘Alī Verdī; also known as ‘Alī Verdī and Karīmābād) is a village in Yalghuz Aghaj Rural District, Serishabad District, Qorveh County, Kurdistan Province, Iran. At the 2006 census, its population was 274, in 70 families. The village is populated by Kurds.
