= Karimabad, Kuhrang =

Karimabad كريم اباد
- Village
- Location within Iran
- Coordinates: 32°09′06″N 50°24′05″E
- Country: Iran
- Province: Chaharmahal and Bakhtiari
- County: Kuhrang
- Bakhsh: Bazoft
- Rural District: Doab

Population (2006)
  - Total: 35
- Time zone: UTC+3:30 (IRST)
  - Summer (DST): UTC+4:30 (IRDT)

Karimabad (Persian: كريم اباد, also Romanized as Karīmābād) is a village in Doab Rural District, Bazoft District, Kuhrang County, Chaharmahal and Bakhtiari Province, Iran. At the 2006 census, its population was 35, in 6 families. The village is populated by Lurs.
