= Karimabad, Kerman =

Karimabad كريم اباد
- Village
- Location within Iran
- Coordinates: 30°17′19″N 58°00′30″E
- Country: Iran
- Province: Kerman
- County: Kerman
- Bakhsh: Shahdad
- Rural District: Takab

Population (2006)
  - Total: 52
- Time zone: UTC+3:30 (IRST)
  - Summer (DST): UTC+4:30 (IRDT)

Karimabad (Persian: كريم اباد, also romanized as Karīmābād) is a village in Takab Rural District, Shahdad District, Kerman County, Kerman Province, Iran. At the 2006 census its population was 52, in 9 families.
