= Karimabad Qadim =

Karimabad Qadim کريم آباد قديم
- Village
- Location within Iran
- Coordinates: 33°55′22″N 47°45′26″E
- Country: Iran
- Province: Lorestan
- County: Delfan
- Bakhsh: Central
- Rural District: Nurabad

Population (2006)
  - Total: 41
- Time zone: UTC+3:30 (IRST)
  - Summer (DST): UTC+4:30 (IRDT)

Karimabad Qadim (Persian: کريم آباد قديم, also Romanized as Karīmābād Qadīm; also known as Karīmābād) is a village in Nurabad Rural District, in the Central District of Delfan County, Lorestan Province, Iran. At the 2006 census, its population was 41, in 8 families.
