= Karimabad, Qaleh Zari =

Karimabad كريم اباد
- Village
- Location within Iran
- Coordinates: 32°13′28″N 58°54′45″E
- Country: Iran
- Province: South Khorasan
- County: Khusf
- Bakhsh: Jolgeh-e Mazhan
- Rural District: Qaleh Zari

Population (2006)
  - Total: 77
- Time zone: UTC+3:30 (IRST)
  - Summer (DST): UTC+4:30 (IRDT)

Karimabad (Persian: كريم اباد, also romanized as Karīmābād; also known as Karīm Abad Khoosaf) is a village in Qaleh Zari Rural District, Jolgeh-e Mazhan District, Khusf County, South Khorasan Province, Iran. At the 2006 census, its population was 77, in 24 families.
