= Karimabad-e Sargorich =

Karimabad-e Sargorich کريم ابادسرگريچ
- Village
- Country: Iran
- Province: Kerman
- County: Faryab
- Bakhsh: Central
- Rural District: Mehruiyeh

Population (2006)
  - Total: 75
- Time zone: UTC+3:30 (IRST)
  - Summer (DST): UTC+4:30 (IRDT)

Karimabad-e Sargorich (Persian: کريم ابادسرگريچ, also Romanized as Karīmābād-e Sargorīch) is a village in Mehruiyeh Rural District, in the Central District of Faryab County, Kerman Province, Iran. At the 2006 census, its population was 75, in 16 families.
