= Karimabad, Roshtkhar =

Karimabad كريم اباد
- Village
- Location within Iran
- Coordinates: 34°55′52″N 59°36′15″E
- Country: Iran
- Province: Razavi Khorasan
- County: Roshtkhar
- Bakhsh: Central
- Rural District: Roshtkhar

Population (2006)
  - Total: 411
- Time zone: UTC+3:30 (IRST)
  - Summer (DST): UTC+4:30 (IRDT)

Karimabad (Persian: كريم اباد, also Romanized as Karīmābād) is a village in Roshtkhar Rural District, in the Central District of Roshtkhar County, Razavi Khorasan Province, Iran. At the 2006 census, its population was 411, in 76 families.
