= Karimabad, Hashivar =

Karimabad كريم اباد
- Village
- Location within Iran
- Coordinates: 28°41′05″N 54°27′45″E
- Country: Iran
- Province: Fars
- County: Darab
- Bakhsh: Central
- Rural District: Hoshivar

Population (2006)
  - Total: 457
- Time zone: UTC+3:30 (IRST)
  - Summer (DST): UTC+4:30 (IRDT)

Karimabad (Persian: كريم اباد, also Romanized as Karīmābād) is a village in Hoshivar Rural District, in the Central District of Darab County, Fars province, Iran. At the 2006 census, its population was 457, in 96 families.
