= Arababad, Dargaz =

Arababad عرب اباد
- Village
- Location within Iran
- Coordinates: 37°16′52″N 58°50′59″E
- Country: Iran
- Province: Razavi Khorasan
- County: Dargaz
- Bakhsh: Chapeshlu
- Rural District: Miankuh

Population (2006)
  - Total: 34
- Time zone: UTC+3:30 (IRST)
  - Summer (DST): UTC+4:30 (IRDT)

Arababad (Persian: عرب اباد, also Romanized as ‘Arabābād) is a village in Miankuh Rural District, Chapeshlu District, Dargaz County, Razavi Khorasan Province, Iran. At the 2006 census, its population was 34, in 8 families.

== See also ==
- List of cities, towns and villages in Razavi Khorasan Province
