= Karimabad-e Tabasi =

Karimabad-e Tabasi كريم ابادطبسي
- Village
- Location within Iran
- Coordinates: 28°44′39″N 59°00′38″E
- Country: Iran
- Province: Kerman
- County: Fahraj
- Bakhsh: Negin Kavir
- Rural District: Chahdegal

Population (2006)
  - Total: 534
- Time zone: UTC+3:30 (IRST)
  - Summer (DST): UTC+4:30 (IRDT)

Karimabad-e Tabasi (Persian: كريم ابادطبسي, also Romanized as Karīmābād-e Ţabasī; also known as Karīmābād) is a village in Chahdegal Rural District, Negin Kavir District, Fahraj County, Kerman Province, Iran. At the 2006 census, its population was 534, in 120 families.
