= Karimabad-e Robat =

Karimabad-e Robat كريم ابادرباط
- Village
- Location within Iran
- Coordinates: 30°13′15″N 56°35′04″E
- Country: Iran
- Province: Kerman
- County: Kerman
- Bakhsh: Central
- Rural District: Baghin

Population (2006)
  - Total: 73
- Time zone: UTC+3:30 (IRST)
  - Summer (DST): UTC+4:30 (IRDT)

Karimabad-e Robat (Persian: كريم ابادرباط, also Romanized as Karīmābād-e Robāṭ; also known as Karīmābād) is a village in Baghin Rural District, in the Central District of Kerman County, Kerman Province, Iran. At the 2006 census, its population was 73, in 14 families.
