= Karamabad, Qaleh-ye Mozaffari =

Karamabad كرم اباد
- Village
- Location within Iran
- Coordinates: 33°51′18″N 48°15′13″E
- Country: Iran
- Province: Lorestan
- County: Selseleh
- Bakhsh: Central
- Rural District: Qaleh-ye Mozaffari

Population (2006)
  - Total: 278
- Time zone: UTC+3:30 (IRST)
  - Summer (DST): UTC+4:30 (IRDT)

Karamabad (Persian: كرم اباد, also Romanized as Karamābād) is a village in Qaleh-ye Mozaffari Rural District, in the Central District of Selseleh County, Lorestan Province, Iran. At the 2006 census, its population was 278, in 53 families.
