= Shadipur, Bhulath =

Shadipur
- Village
- Location in Punjab, India Shadipur (India)
- Coordinates: 31.473804°N 75.488861°E
- Country: India
- State: Punjab
- District: Kapurthala

Government
  - Type: Panchayati raj (India)
  - Body: Gram panchayat

Population (2011)
  - Total: 247
- Sex ratio 131/116♂/♀

Languages
  - Official: Punjabi
  - Other spoken: Hindi
- Time zone: UTC+5:30 (IST)
- PIN: 144401
- Telephone code: 01822
- ISO 3166 code: IN-PB
- Vehicle registration: PB-09
- Website: kapurthala.gov.in

Shadipur is a village in Bhulath Tehsil in Kapurthala district of Punjab State, India. It is located 8 kilometres (5.0 mi) from Bhulath, 23 kilometres (14 mi) away from district headquarter Kapurthala. The village is administrated by a Sarpanch, who is an elected representative.

== Demography ==
According to the report published by Census India in 2011, Shadipur has 55 houses with the total population of 247 persons of which 131 are male and 116 females. Literacy rate of Shadipur is 78.67%, higher than the state average of 75.84%. The population of children in the age group 0–6 years is 36 which is 14.57% of the total population. Child sex ratio is approximately 1250, higher than the state average of 846.

== Population data ==
Particulars	Total	Male	Female
Total No. of Houses	55	-	-
Population	247	131	116
Child (0–6)	36	16	20
Schedule Caste	187	101	86
Schedule Tribe	0	0	0
Literacy	78.67 %	79.13 %	78.13 %
Total Workers	94	80	14
Main Worker	89	0	0
Marginal Worker	5	1	4

As per census 2011, 94 people were engaged in work activities out of the total population of Shadipur which includes 80 males and 14 females. According to census survey report 2011, 94.68% workers (Employment or Earning more than 6 Months) describe their work as main work and 5.32% workers are involved in Marginal activity providing livelihood for less than 6 months.

== Caste ==
The village has schedule caste (SC) constitutes 75.71% of total population of the village and it doesn't have any Schedule Tribe (ST) population.

== List of cities near the village ==
- Bhulath
- Kapurthala
- Phagwara
- Sultanpur Lodhi

== Air travel connectivity ==
The closest International airport to the village is Sri Guru Ram Dass Jee International Airport.
