= Deh Khan, Shahdad =

Deh Khan ده خان
- Village
- Location within Iran
- Coordinates: 30°26′57″N 57°49′15″E
- Country: Iran
- Province: Kerman
- County: Kerman
- Bakhsh: Shahdad
- Rural District: Takab

Population (2006)
  - Total: 125
- Time zone: UTC+3:30 (IRST)
  - Summer (DST): UTC+4:30 (IRDT)

Deh Khan (Persian: ده خان, also Romanized as Deh Khān; also known as Dehqān) is a village in Takab Rural District, Shahdad District, Kerman County, Kerman Province, Iran. At the 2006 census, its population was 125, in 30 families.
