= Shadipur, Fatehgarh Sahib =

Shadipur
- Village
- Location in Punjab, India Shadipur (India)
- Coordinates: 30.761069°N 76.432813°E
- Country: India
- State: Punjab
- District: Fatehgarh sahib

Population
  - Total: 500

Languages
  - Official: Punjabi
- Time zone: UTC+5:30 (IST)
- PIN: 141128
- Telephone code: 0160

Shadipur is a village in Sanghol. It falls under Khamono tehsil in Fatehgarh Sahib District of Indian state of Punjab.

== About ==
Shadipur is almost 6 km from Sanghol. The nearest Railway station to Shadipur is Nogawan Railway station. The village is famous for NIRMAL-A-SANT GURCHARAN SINGH.

== Post code and STD code ==
Shadipur's Post code and STD code are 141128 & 0160 respectively.
