= Karamabad, Doab =

Village in Lorestan, Iran

Karamabad كرم اباد
- Village
- Location within Iran
- Coordinates: 33°51′45″N 48°13′30″E
- Country: Iran
- Province: Lorestan
- County: Selseleh
- Bakhsh: Central
- Rural District: Doab

Population (2006)
  - Total: 24
- Time zone: UTC+3:30 (IRST)
  - Summer (DST): UTC+4:30 (IRDT)

Karamabad (Persian: كرم اباد, also Romanized as Karamābād; also known as Karīmābād) is a village in Doab Rural District, in the Central District of Selseleh County, Lorestan Province, Iran. At the 2006 census, its population was 24, in 5 families.
