= Bassi Pathana =

Bassi Pathana City of Pathanas
- Historic city
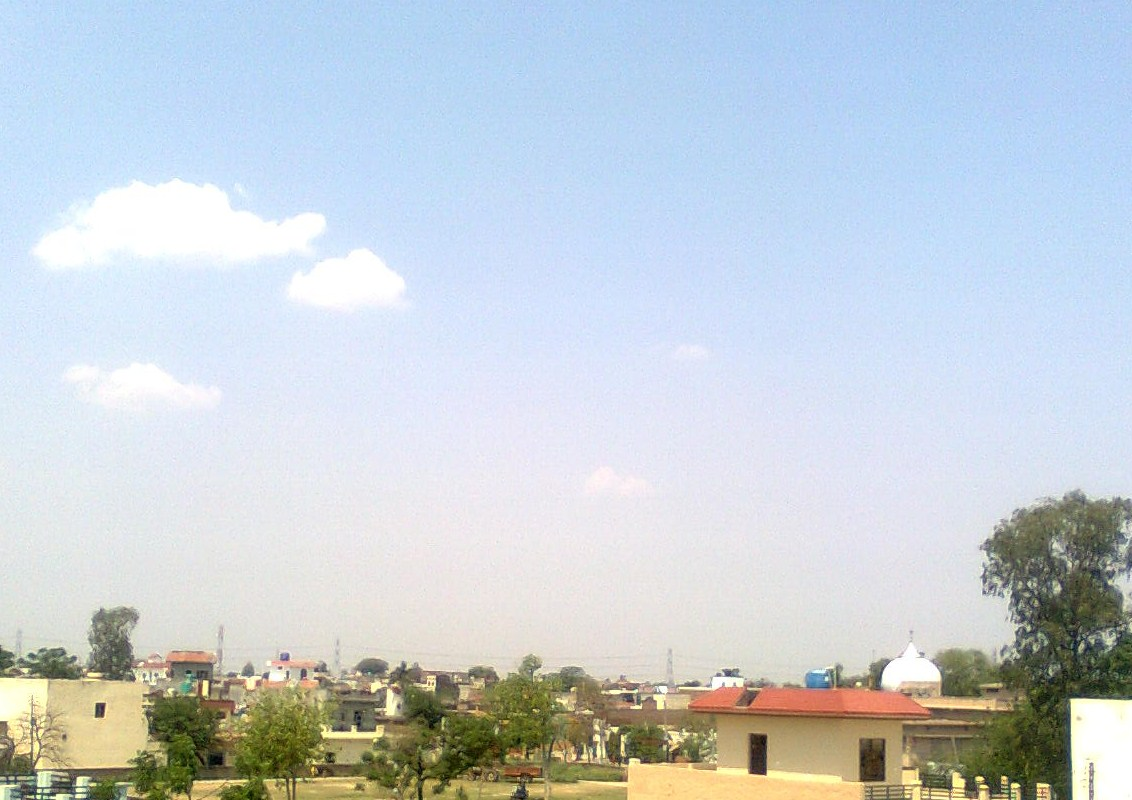
- Bassi Pathana Skyline
- Nickname: Bassi
- Location in Punjab, India
- Coordinates: 30.7097°N 76.4084°E
- Country: India
- State: Punjab
- District: Fatehgarh Sahib
- Established: 1540

Population (2001)
  - Total: 18,547

Languages
  - Official: Punjabi
- Time zone: UTC+5:30 (IST)
- PIN: 140412
- Telephone code: 01763
- Vehicle registration: PB-52
- Sex ratio: 800:1000 ♂/♀

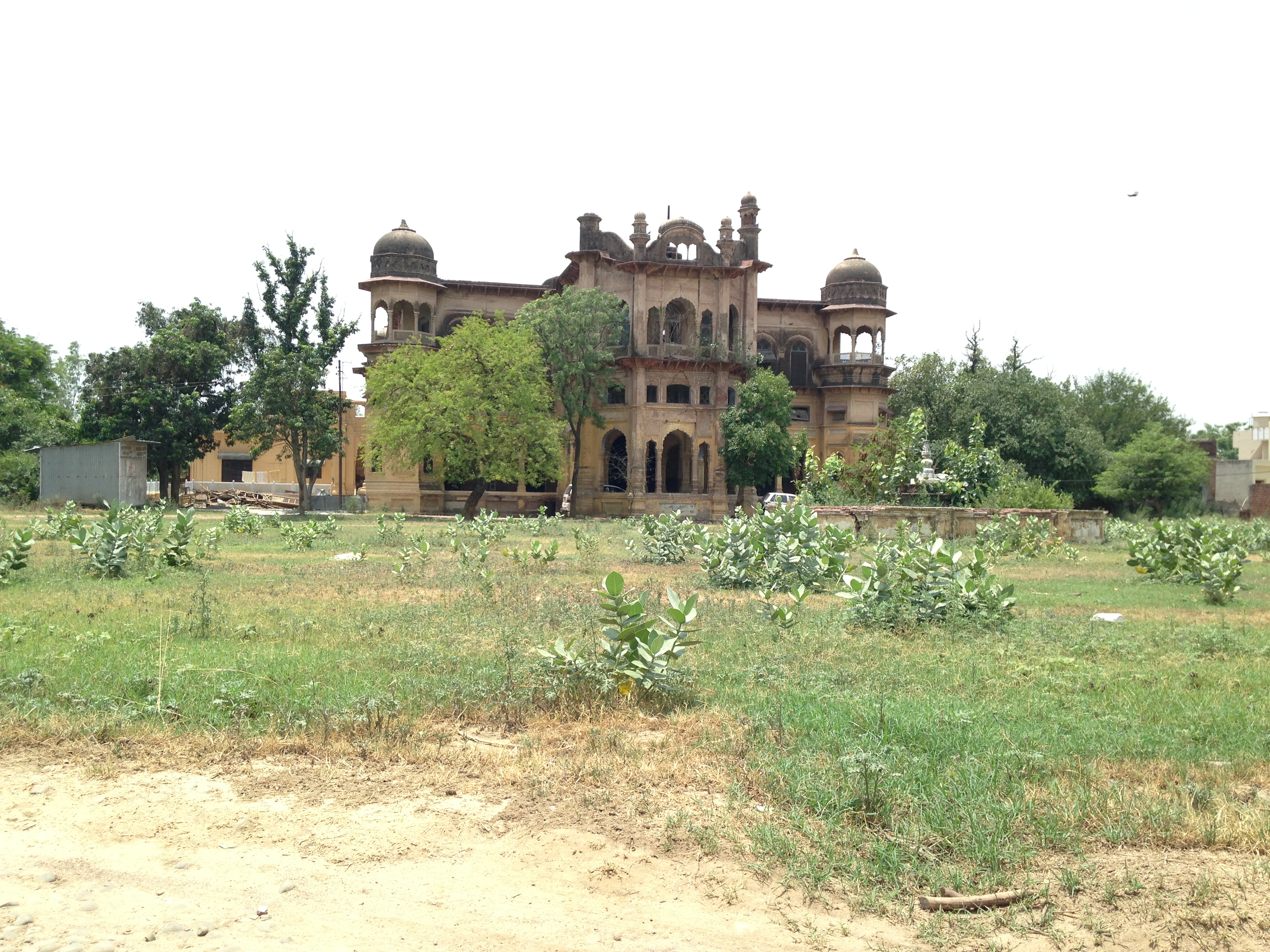
Haveli of Hafiz Muhammad Halim, Bassi

Bassi Pathana is a historical city and a municipal council in Fatehgarh Sahib district in the state of Punjab, India. It is well known for being Asia's first market for sewing machines. Bassi Pathana is the founder of the First Sewing Machine and its key parts in Asia in the 1920s. India's first sewing machine was manufactured by Pt. Ramjidass of Bassi Pathanan in 1925.

== Demographics ==
As of 2011 India census, Bassi Pathana had a population of 20,288 with 10,665 males and 9,623 females. Bassi Pathana has an average literacy rate of 79%, higher than the national average of 74.04%; with 81% of the males and 75% of females literate. 9.5% of the population is under 6 years of age.

== History ==
According to legend, Bassi Pathana was founded in 1540. As the name suggests, it was a city of Muslim Pathans. After this place was visited by the 9th Sikh master Guru Teg Bahadur Ji they changed the city name to Bassi i.e. Bassi Pathanan.

Bassi Pathana was visited by the 9th Sikh Master Guru Teg Bahadur Ji and the 10th Sikh Master Guru Gobind Singh Ji. There is one Historical Gurdwara (Sikh temple) in the city in their memory.

A temple of Sh. Sant Namdev Ji is also situated in this city.

This historic city has one temple named Brahamghat, where a sage called Rishi Ajgaiwanand is said to have meditated here for years. During one of those meditation sessions, someone came to check whether he was meditating or not and put his leg in the Agni (Fire) which is traditionally lit while meditating. He was so involved in meditation that he did not realize that he had lost his leg in the fire. When his disciples saw that he had lost his leg, they made a leg of wood and brass. He was so delighted with this gesture that he blessed this city and said that no misfortune can ever strike this city. If misfortune is sensed then this leg (after his death) should be moved through each house and misfortune will go away. Its popular temple is Shri Usha Mata Ji Mandir near Brahamghat Temple.

This city also has a historic lord Shiva temple named Prachin Shiv Mandir (in old Subzi Mandi) situated in the main bazaar of Bassi Pathana near the main post office.

Bassi Pathanan city also had an old railway station which was built during the British rule in India.

India's first sewing machine was manufactured by Pt. Ramjidass in 1925. There are now many factories that make sewing machine parts.

== Councils ==
The Town is the block of the District as it contains 86 villages. The City also has its own Municipal Corporation. It had divided the city into Wards (parts) and each ward had its representative known as the Municipal Councilor (MC). The main city has approximately 15 Wards.

Villages in the Bassi Pathana Tehsil include:

- Nandpur Kalaur

== Religions ==
The city population comprises these religions Sikhs, Hindu, Jainis, Christians and Muslims

There are many temples, gurudwaras, masjids, and a church within the city. Mainly as Sh. Namdev Ji(Mandir) Temple, Prachin Shri Ram Mandir(Nav Garah Mandir) Temple, Prachin Shri Shiva Temple(Mahadevas), Usha Mata Mandir, Baba Rishi Ajgawanand(Brahmghat Mandir), belong to Hindu and many more. There are many gurdwaras here as Shri Guru Arjan Dev Ji, Shri Guru Teg Bahadur Ji, Shri Guru Gobind Sing Ji belongs to Sikhs, and many more. There are 2 biggest Jama Masjids in the city are belong to Muslims. There is also a Church historical symbol of Jesus that belongs to Christians.

== Basant Panjami/Panchami festival ==
The biggest festival in Bassi Pathana is Basant Panchami(Panjami). It is celebrated in the month of Magh (January–February as per the Gregorian calendar). Because of the festival, a big fair is held continuously for three days.

== Education ==
Bassi Pathana has a Govt. recognized institute for full-time training courses on International courses based on ITI (Industrial Training Institute). There are mainly three colleges within the city: Sant Namdev Kanya Maha Vidyalaya College(Punjabi University) and Pine Grove College. As per the Schooling, there are many schools. The most prefers are listed below and they are within the city limits:

| S No. | Name |
| 1 | Govt. Senior Secondary High School(Boys) |
| 2 | Govt. Senior Secondary High School(Girls) |
| 3 | Holy Heart Public High School |
| 4 | S.D Public School For Girls |
| 5 | Guru Nanak Dev Public School |
| 6 | Pine Grove Public High School |
| 7 | Govt. Lala Lajpat Rai High School |
| 8 | Play Way School |
| 9 | Garden Valley International School |
| 10 | Govt. Elementary School-Block 1(Mandi School) |
| 11 | Govt. SD Model Hindi School(Puttari Path Shala)-Block 2 |
| 12 | Govt. Old Jail School-Block 2 |
| 13 | Sant Namdev Kanya Public School |
| 14 | SDAV Modern Cosmic Public School |
| 15 | Govt. Anganwari Elementary School-Block 2 |
| 16 | Govt. Masjid(Maseet) Elementary School-Block 2 |
| 17 | S.T Mary's School, Mahadian |
