= Karimabad-e Olya, Rafsanjan =

Karimabad-e Olya كريم ابادعليا
- Village
- Location within Iran
- Coordinates: 30°23′41″N 56°03′33″E
- Country: Iran
- Province: Kerman
- County: Rafsanjan
- Bakhsh: Central
- Rural District: Kabutar Khan

Population (2006)
  - Total: 1,515
- Time zone: UTC+3:30 (IRST)
  - Summer (DST): UTC+4:30 (IRDT)

Karimabad-e Olya (Persian: كريم ابادعليا, also Romanized as Karīmābād-e ‘Olyā; also known as Karīmābād-e Bālā and Karim Abad Olya Hoomeh) is a village in Kabutar Khan Rural District, in the Central District of Rafsanjan County, Kerman Province, Iran. At the 2006 census, its population was 1,515, in 360 families.
