= Karimabad-e Olya, Anbarabad =

Karimabad-e Olya كريم ابادعليا
- Village
- Location within Iran
- Coordinates: 28°31′05″N 57°43′01″E
- Country: Iran
- Province: Kerman
- County: Anbarabad
- Bakhsh: Esmaili
- Rural District: Hoseynabad

Population (2006)
  - Total: 699
- Time zone: UTC+3:30 (IRST)
  - Summer (DST): UTC+4:30 (IRDT)

Karimabad-e Olya (Persian: كريم ابادعليا, also Romanized as Karīmābād-e ‘Olyā; also known as Karīmābād-e Bālā) is a village in Hoseynabad Rural District, Esmaili District, Anbarabad County, Kerman Province, Iran. At the 2006 census, its population was 699, in 154 families.
