= Qanatghestan Rural District =

Rural district in Kerman province, Iran

Qanatghestan Rural District Persian: دهستان قناتغستان
- Rural District
- Location within Iran
- Coordinates: 30°05′28″N 57°04′17″E
- Country: Iran
- Province: Kerman
- County: Kerman
- District: Mahan
- Capital: Mohiabad

Population (2016)
  - Total: 2,553
- Time zone: UTC+3:30 (IRST)

Qanatghestan Rural District (Persian: دهستان قناتغستان) is in Mahan District of Kerman County, Kerman province, Iran. It is administered from the city of Mohiabad. The previous capital of the rural district was the village of Qanatghestan.

== Demographics ==
=== Population ===
At the time of the 2006 National Census, the rural district's population was 2,449 in 637 households. There were 2,925 inhabitants in 833 households at the following census of 2011. The 2016 census measured the population of the rural district as 2,553 in 757 households. The most populous of its 59 villages was Qanatghestan, with 1,147 people.
