= Moezziyeh Rural District =

Rural district in Kerman province, Iran

Moezziyeh Rural District Persian: دهستان معزيه
- Rural District
- Location within Iran
- Coordinates: 30°34′57″N 57°01′26″E
- Country: Iran
- Province: Kerman
- County: Kerman
- District: Chatrud
- Capital: Hutak

Population (2016)
  - Total: 8,047
- Time zone: UTC+3:30 (IRST)

Moezziyeh Rural District (Persian: دهستان معزيه) is in Chatrud District of Kerman County, Kerman province, Iran. Its capital is the village of Hutak.

== Demographics ==
=== Population ===
At the time of the 2006 National Census, the rural district's population was 6,669 in 1,768 households. There were 7,087 inhabitants in 2,049 households at the following census of 2011. The 2016 census measured the population of the rural district as 8,047 in 2,515 households. The most populous of its 64 villages was Hutak, with 3,415 people.
