= Mahan Rural District =

Rural district in Kerman province, Iran

Mahan Rural District Persian: دهستان ماهان
- Rural District
- Location within Iran
- Coordinates: 29°56′29″N 57°21′16″E
- Country: Iran
- Province: Kerman
- County: Kerman
- District: Mahan
- Capital: Langar

Population (2016)
  - Total: 4,008
- Time zone: UTC+3:30 (IRST)

Mahan Rural District (Persian: دهستان ماهان) is in Mahan District of Kerman County, Kerman province, Iran. Its capital is the village of Langar.

== Demographics ==
=== Population ===
At the time of the 2006 National Census, the rural district's population was 3,364 in 886 households. There were 3,560 inhabitants in 1,053 households at the following census of 2011. The 2016 census measured the population of the rural district as 4,008 in 1,245 households. The most populous of its 79 villages was Langar, with 1,818 people.
