= Mahan District =

District in Kerman province, Iran

Mahan District Persian: بخش ماهان
- District
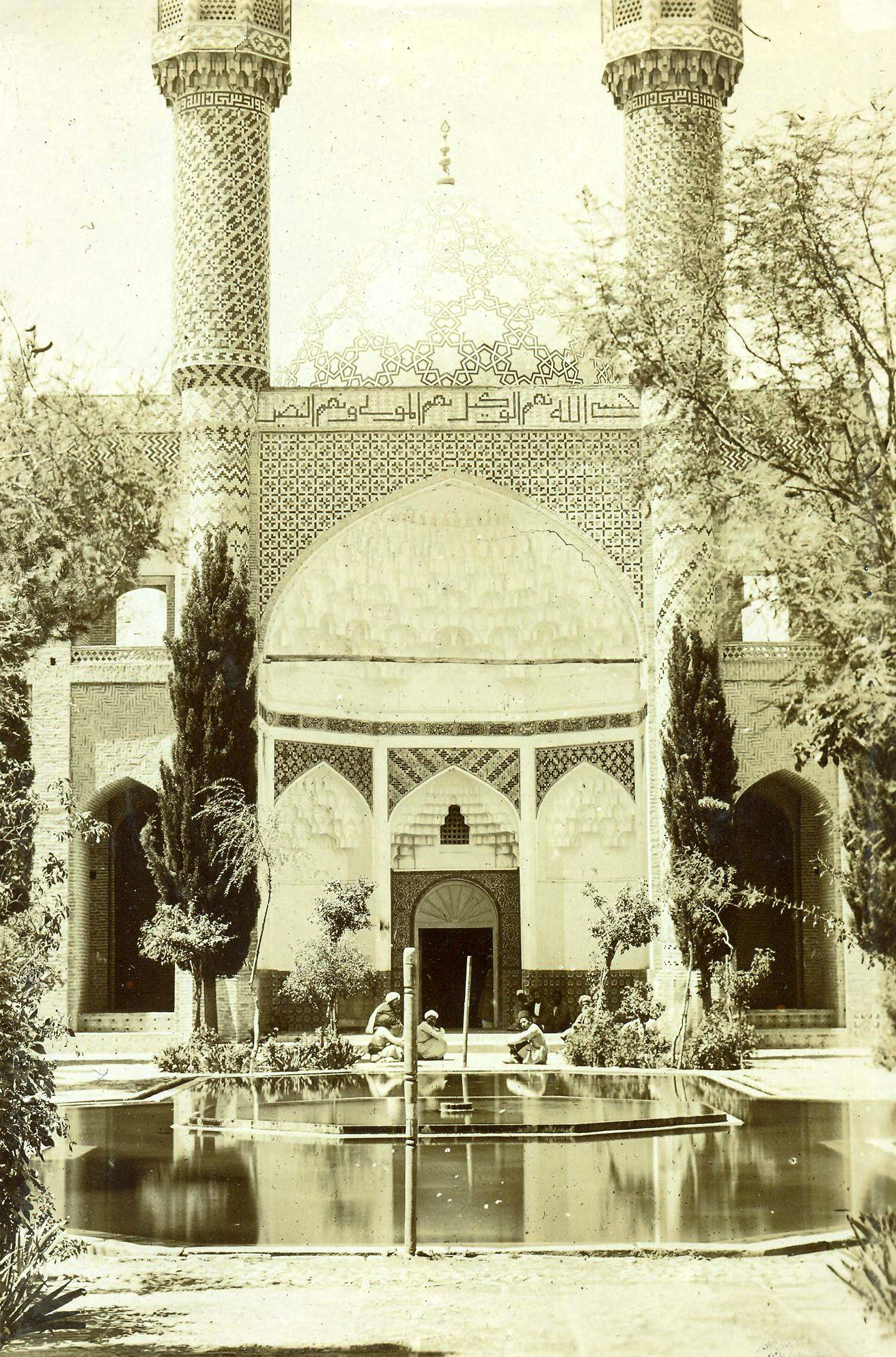
- Shah Nematollah Vali Shrine in Mahan, Kerman, Qajar era, 1902

- Location within Iran
- Coordinates: 29°58′36″N 57°14′41″E
- Country: Iran
- Province: Kerman
- County: Kerman
- Capital: Mahan

Population (2016)
  - Total: 33,521
- Time zone: UTC+3:30 (IRST)

Mahan District (Persian: بخش ماهان) is in Kerman County, Kerman province, Iran. Its capital is the city of Mahan.

== Demographics ==
=== Population ===
At the time of the 2006 National Census, the district's population was 29,923 in 7,607 households. The following census in 2011 counted 31,319 people in 8,820 households. The 2016 census measured the population of the district as 33,521 inhabitants in 10,024 households.

=== Administrative divisions ===
Mahan District Population
| Administrative Divisions | 2006 | 2011 | 2016 |
|---|---|---|---|
| Mahan RD | 3,364 | 3,560 | 4,008 |
| Qanatghestan RD | 2,449 | 2,925 | 2,553 |
| Jupar (city) | 3,830 | 3,937 | 3,607 |
| Mahan (city) | 16,787 | 17,178 | 19,423 |
| Mohiabad (city) | 3,493 | 3,719 | 3,930 |
| Total | 29,923 | 31,319 | 33,521 |
RD = Rural District
