= Kavirat Rural District (Kerman County) =

Rural district in Kerman province, Iran

Kavirat Rural District Persian: دهستان كويرات
- Rural District
- Location within Iran
- Coordinates: 30°35′00″N 56°44′48″E
- Country: Iran
- Province: Kerman
- County: Kerman
- District: Chatrud
- Capital: Kazemabad

Population (2016)
  - Total: 13,216
- Time zone: UTC+3:30 (IRST)

Kavirat Rural District (Persian: دهستان كويرات) is in Chatrud District of Kerman County, Kerman province, Iran. It is administered from the city of Kazemabad.

== Demographics ==
=== Population ===
At the time of the 2006 National Census, the rural district's population was 8,737 in 1,988 households. There were 10,885 inhabitants in 2,975 households at the following census of 2011. The 2016 census measured the population of the rural district as 13,216 in 3,608 households. The most populous of its 118 villages was Rahimabad, with 3,365 people.
