= Chatrud District =

District in Kerman province, Iran

Chatrud District Persian: بخش چترود
- District
- Location within Iran
- Coordinates: 30°35′00″N 56°50′28″E
- Country: Iran
- Province: Kerman
- County: Kerman
- Capital: Chatrud

Population (2016)
  - Total: 31,183
- Time zone: UTC+3:30 (IRST)

Chatrud District (Persian: بخش چترود) is in Kerman County, Kerman province, Iran. Its capital is the city of Chatrud.

== Demographics ==
=== Population ===
At the time of the 2006 National Census, the district's population was 24,678 in 5,946 households. The following census in 2011 counted 26,961 people in 7,401 households. The 2016 census measured the population of the district as 31,183 inhabitants in 9,004 households.

=== Administrative divisions ===
Chatrud District Population
Administrative Divisions	2006	2011	2016
Kavirat RD	8,737	10,885	13,216
Moezziyeh RD	6,669	7,087	8,047
Chatrud (city)	5,660	5,344	5,860
Kazemabad (city)	3,612	3,645	4,060
Total	24,678	26,961	31,183
RD = Rural District
