= Lion and Sun =

Motif and symbol in Persian heraldry

Lion and Sun شیر و خورشید Shir o Khorshid
- The final Lion and Sun design used on flags at the Iranian Prime Minister's Office before the 1979 Revolution, documented in 1978–1979 and appearing in official documents as early as 1972. Its use continued into the early post-revolutionary period. (Note: For more information, see #Modernist stylized design of the 1970s)

Versions
- Modern version commonly used by Iranians today; not officially used prior to 1979, though possibly originating from historical imagery

- A modern reconstruction; not officially used prior to 1979

- Older version used by the Imperial State of Iran during the 1940s and 1950s
- Other elements: The sun and the lion holding a shamshir (a long, curved sword)
- Use: Former emblem of Iran, former flag of Iran (before the 1979 revolution)

The Lion and Sun (Note: Persian: شیر و خورشید, romanised: Shir o Khorshid, pronounced [ˌʃiːɹ‿o xoɹˈʃiːd]; Classical Persian: Sher u Khwarshed [ˌʃeːr‿u xʷarˈʃeːd]) is one of the main emblems of Iran (historically known as Persia by the west but natively known as Ēran-Shahr) and was a central element in Iran's national flag until the 1979 Islamic revolution. It remains widely used by Iranian nationalists and opposition groups to the Islamic Republic government.

A version of the Lion and Sun that features a sun half-hidden behind a lion appears for the first time in the Book of Nativities written by Albumasar, with illustrations by the Persian artist Qanbar ʿAli Shirazi in the 14th century. However, the Lion and Sun symbol was used in pre-Islamic times, prior to the Achaemenid dynasty, while the sun was used on the standards, flags, and banners of pre-Achaemenid times. The secular origins of the Lion and Sun trace back to pre-Islamic Persian astronomy and astrology, symbolising the sun in the Leo constellation. The Lion and Sun motif gained widespread popularity following the advent of Islam, appearing frequently on coins, metalwork, tiles, and miniature paintings throughout Iran, Central Asia, and India.

== Origin ==
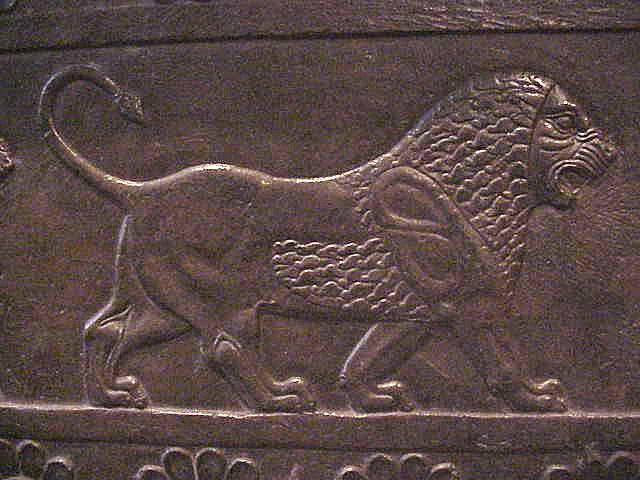
Sign of Lion in Persepolis; Achaemenid Persian relief University of Chicago Oriental Institute

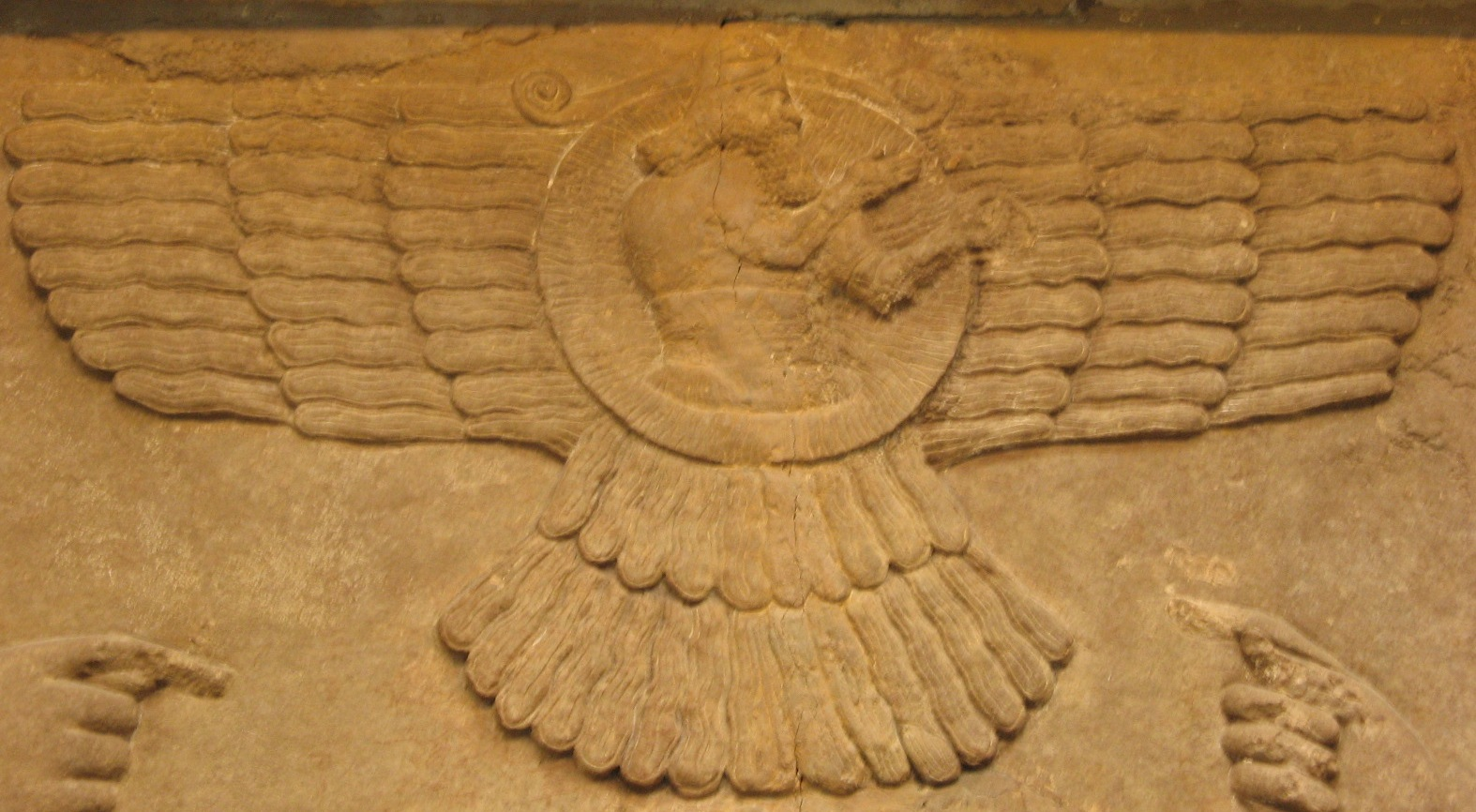
Mesopotamian Sun God Shamash; Assyrian relief, North-West Palace of Nimrud (room B, panel 23); 865–860 BC

The Lion and Sun motif is based largely on secular astronomical and astrological configurations, and the ancient zodiacal sign of the sun in the house of Leo. The earliest evidence of the Lion and Sun symbol predates the Achaemenid dynasty. However, this symbol became a popular symbol in the 12th century. According to Afsaneh Najmabadi, the Lion and Sun motif has had "a unique success" among icons for signifying the modern Iranian identity, in that the symbol is influenced by all significant historical cultures of Iran and brings together Zoroastrian, Shia, Jewish, Iranian symbolism.

=== Zodiacal and Semitic roots ===
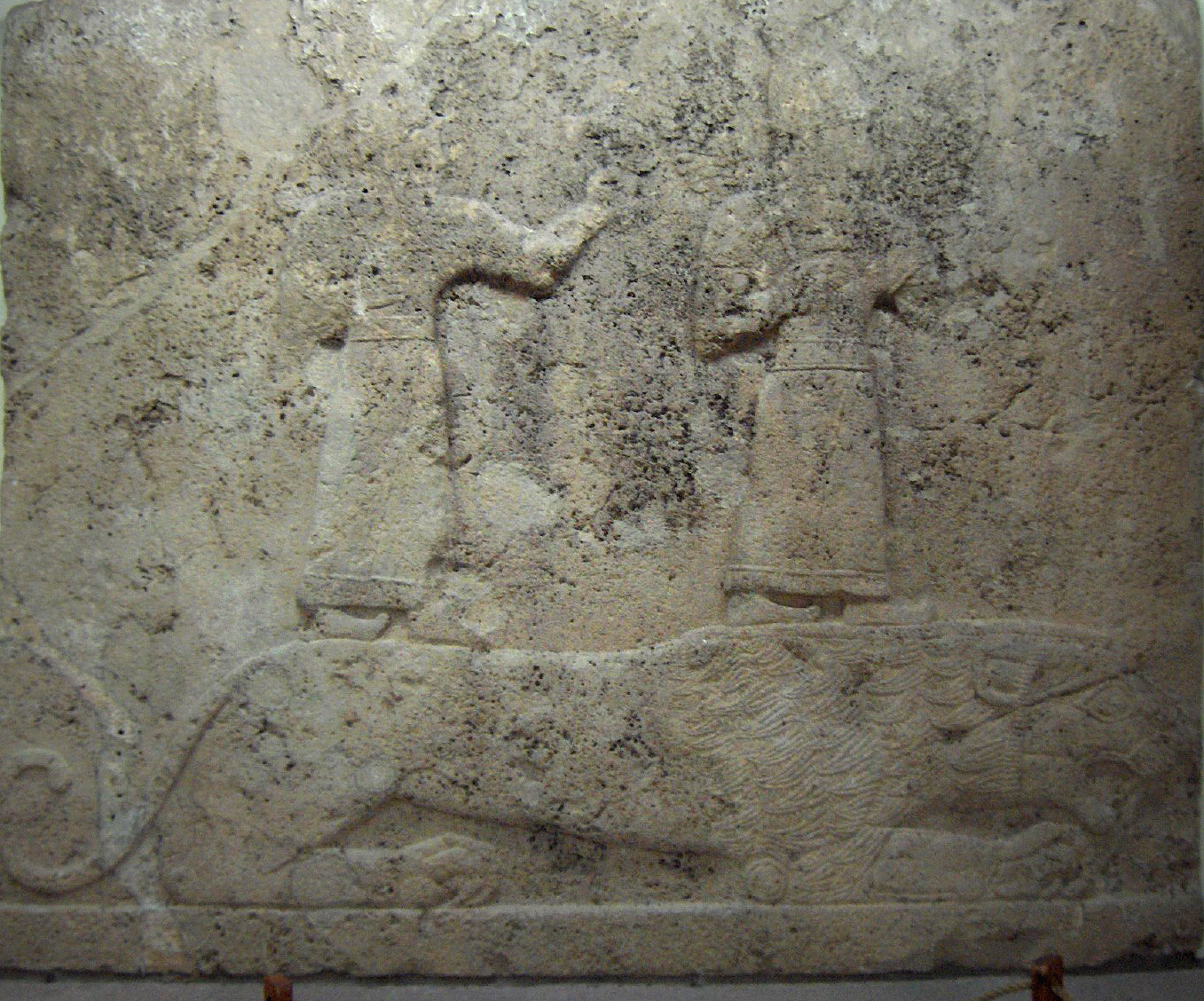
Sun and moon god standing on a lion; orthostat relief from Herald's wall, Carchemish; 950–850 BC; Late Hittite style; Museum of Anatolian Civilisations, Ankara, Turkey

According to Krappe, the astrological combination of the sun above a lion has become the coat of arms of Iran. In Persian astrology the zodiacal Lion was the 'house' of the sun. This notion has "unquestionably" an ancient Mesopotamian origin. Since ancient times there was a close connection between the sun gods and the lion in the lore of the zodiac. It is known that, the sun, at its maximum strength between 20 July and 20 August, was in the 'house' of the Lion.

Krappe reviews the ancient traditions of West Asia and how sun gods and divinities were closely connected to each other, and concludes that "the Persian solar lion, to this day the coat-of-arms of Iran, is evidently derived from the same ancient [West Asian] sun god". As an example, he notes that in Syria the lion was the symbol of the sun. In Canaan, a lion-slaying hero was the son of Baal (i.e. Lord) Shamash, the great Semitic god of the sun. This lion-slayer was originally a lion. The same symbolism is observed in Ancient Egypt where in the Temple of Dendera, Ahi the Great is called "the Lion of the Sun, and the lion who rises in the northern sky, the brilliant god who bears the sun".

=== Iranian background ===
The male sun had always been associated with Iranian royalty: Iranian tradition recalls that Kayanids had a golden sun as their emblem. From the Greek historians of classical antiquity it is known that a crystal image of the sun adorned the royal tent of Darius III, that the Arsacid banner was adorned with the sun, and that Sasanian standards had a red ball symbolising the sun. The Byzantine chronicler Malalas records that the salutation of a letter from the "Persian king, the Sun of the East," was addressed to the "Roman Caesar, the Moon of the West". The Turanian king Afrasiab is recalled as saying: "I have heard from wise men that when the Moon of the Turan rises up it will be harmed by the Sun of the Iranians." The sun was always imagined as male, and in some banners a figure of a male replaces the symbol of the sun. In others, a male figure accompanies the sun.

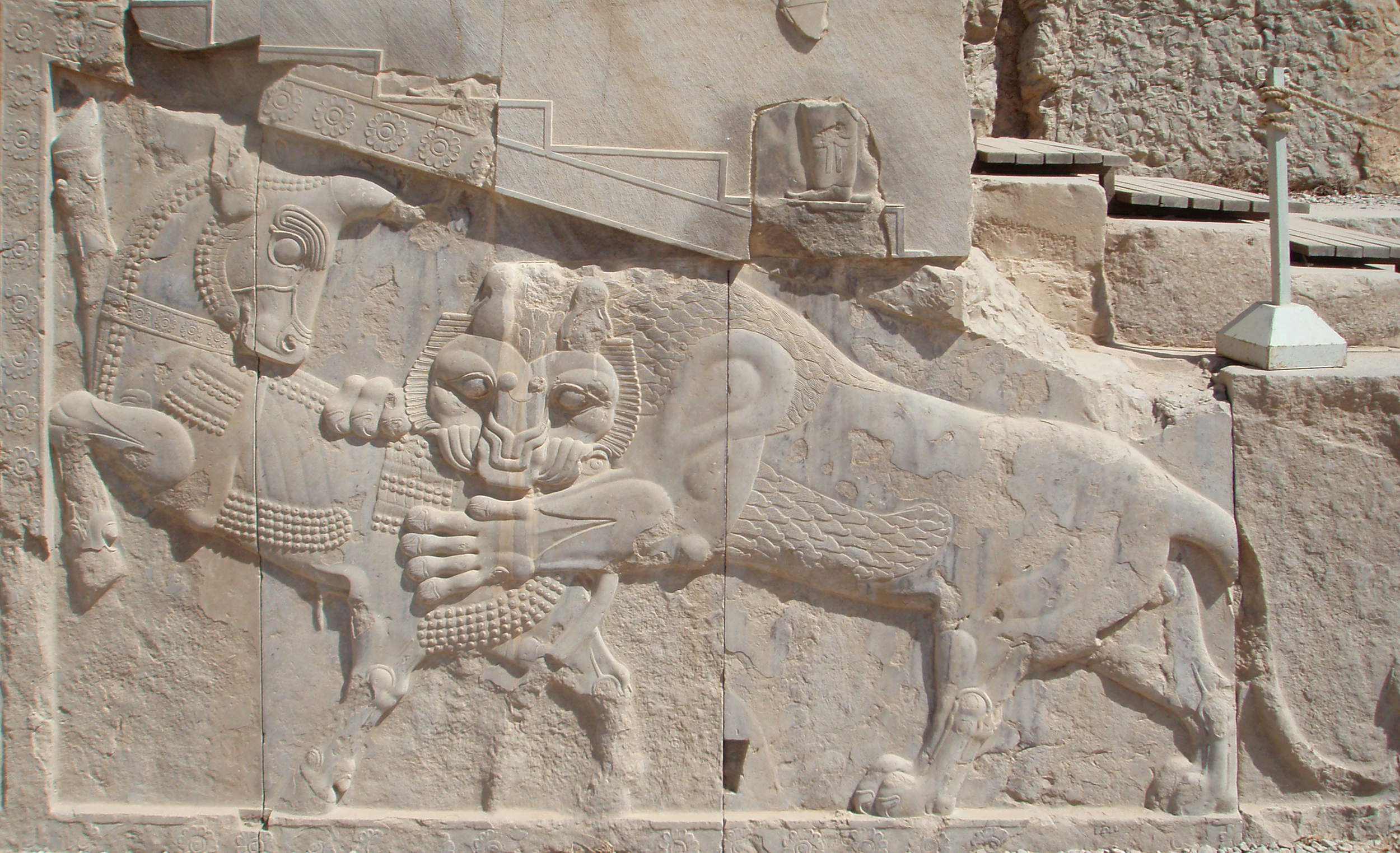
Bas-relief in Persepolis a symbol of Zoroastrian Nowruz – on the spring equinox, the power of an eternally fighting bull (personifying the Earth), and a lion (personifying the Sun), are equal

Similarly, the lion too has always had a close association with Iranian kingship. The garments and throne decorations of the Achaemenid shahs were embroidered with lion motifs. The crown of the half-Persian Seleucid king Antiochus I was adorned with a lion. In the Investiture Relief of Ardashir I at Naqsh-e Rostam, the breast armour of the king is decorated with lions. Moreover, in some Iranian dialects the word for king (shah) is pronounced as sher, homonymous with the word for lion. Islamic, Turkish, and Mongol influences also stressed the symbolic association of the lion and royalty. The earliest evidence for the use of a lion on a standard comes from the Shahnameh, which noted that the feudal house of Godarz (presumably a family of Parthian or Sasanian times) adopted a golden lion for its devices.

=== Persian, Turkic, Mongolic influence ===
Persian, Turkic, and Mongol traditions stressed the symbolic association of the lion and royalty in the Lion and Sun motif. These cultures reaffirmed the charismatic power of the sun and the Mongols re-introduced the veneration of the sun, especially the sunrise. The lion is probably represented more frequently and diversely than any other animal. In most forms, the lion has no apotropaic meaning and was merely decorative. However, it sometimes has an astrological or symbolic meaning. One of the popular forms of the lion is explicitly heraldic form, including in the Iranian coat of arms (the Lion and Sun); the animal in the coat of arms of the Mamluk Baybars and perhaps also in that of the Rum Saldjukids of the name of Kilidi Arslan; and in numismatic representations.

There is a ceramic tablet found in Shadiyakh dating to the Seljuq period that depicts the Lion and Sun as the symbol of Leo, along with the signs of Gemini, Cancer, and Virgo.

According to the Persian book al-Tafhim, written by Al-Biruni, the celestial objects used in astrological judgements are Saturn, Jupiter, Mars, the Sun, Venus, Mercury, and the Moon. To each of them, one or more zodiac signs are assigned, representing the ‘house’ or dwelling of that celestial object. In astrology, these houses were used in understanding nativities and in determining the length of a newborn’s life.

- The house of the Sun: Leo
- The house of the Moon: Cancer
- The houses of Mercury: Virgo and Gemini
- The houses of Venus: Libra and Taurus
- The houses of Mars: Scorpio and Aries
- The houses of Jupiter: Sagittarius and Pisces
- The houses of Saturn: Capricorn and Aquarius

== History ==
=== Pre-Islamic era ===
The earliest evidence of the Lion and Sun symbol in Iran dates back to thousands of years ago, even predating the Achaemenid era.

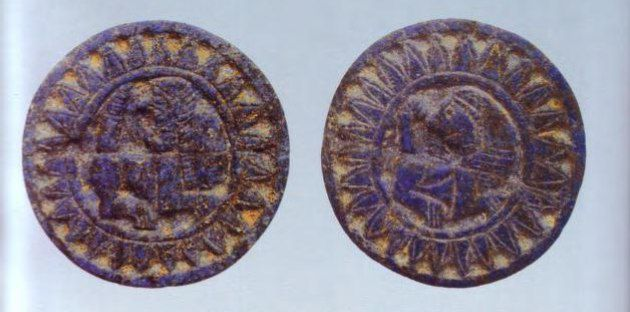
The earliest representations of the Lion and Sun, a lapis lazuli seal from the Jiroft civilisation (c. 3rd Millennium BC).

During the Achaemenid period, the Lion and Sun motif appeared in several forms. One example is a seal depicting Artaxerxes II accompanied by a lion, the sun symbolising Mithra, and a woman riding a lion representing Anahita.

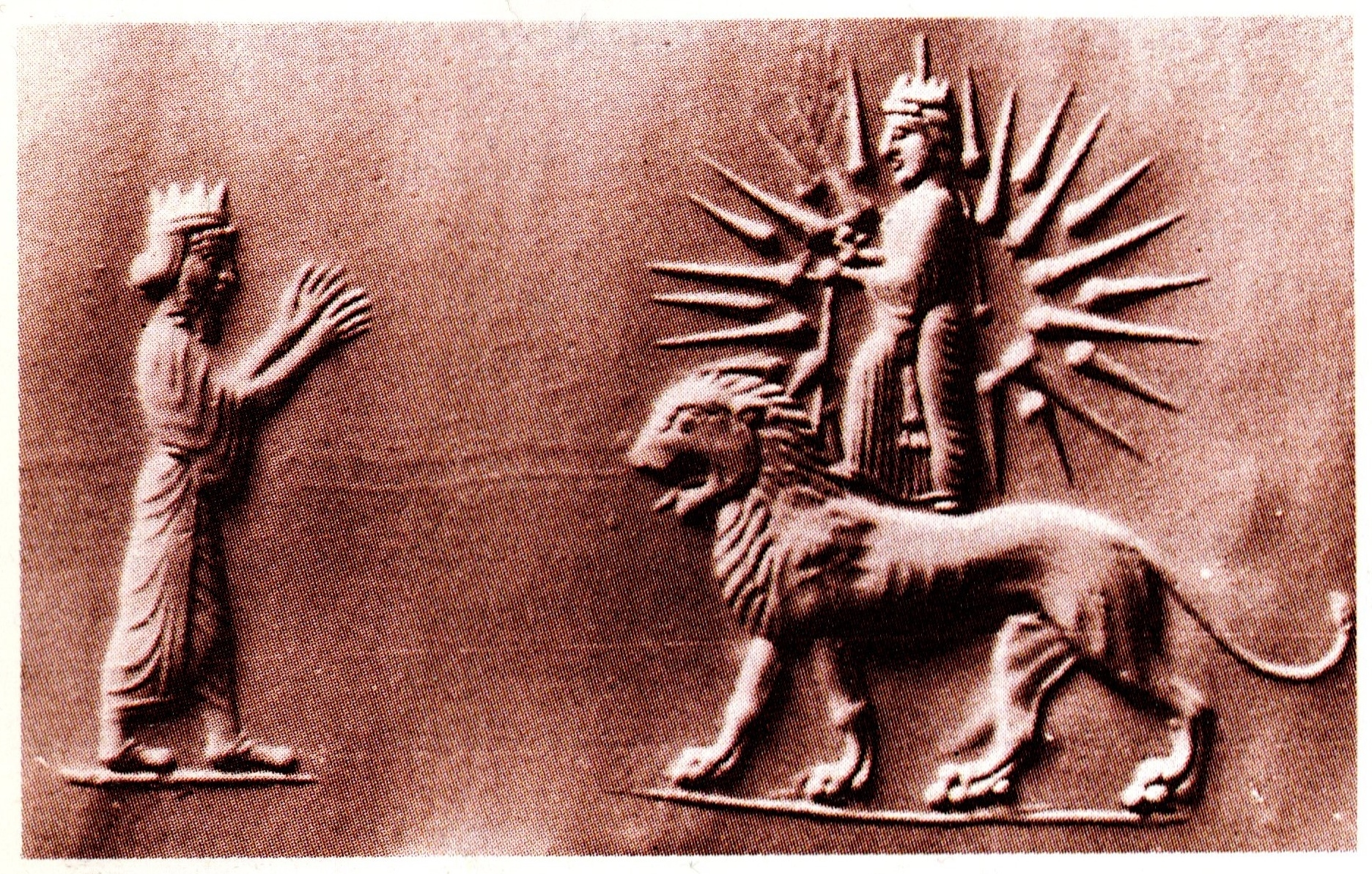
Achaemenid seal, depicting Artaxerxes II together with Anahita in a Lion and Sun motif

Lion appears on most of the coins issued by the Persian satrap of Cilicia, Mazaeus, (coins on numitsa website) however, only two of them depict a Lion and Sun motif. (see other coin)

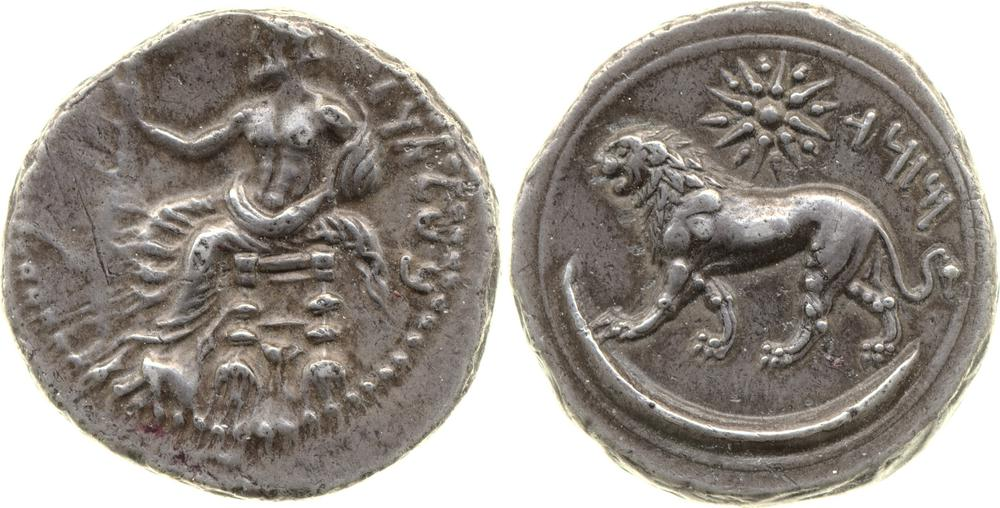
Silver coin of Mazaeus, satrap of Cilicia, minted in Myriandrus, 361–333 BC (circa).

Lion and Sun motif also appears on a coin issued by an uncertain Persian satrap of Babylonia. (see coin)

=== Early Islamic era ===
The earliest post-Islamic appearance of the Lion and Sun is found in the Book of Nativities, written by Albumasar, a Persian astrologer who was regarded as the leading astrologer of the Abbasid court in Baghdad's House of wisdom. This source shows the astronomical roots of the Lion and Sun motif. Albumasar based his work on translations of pre-Islamic Sasanian astronomical texts and also practiced astrology using the positions of celestial bodies.

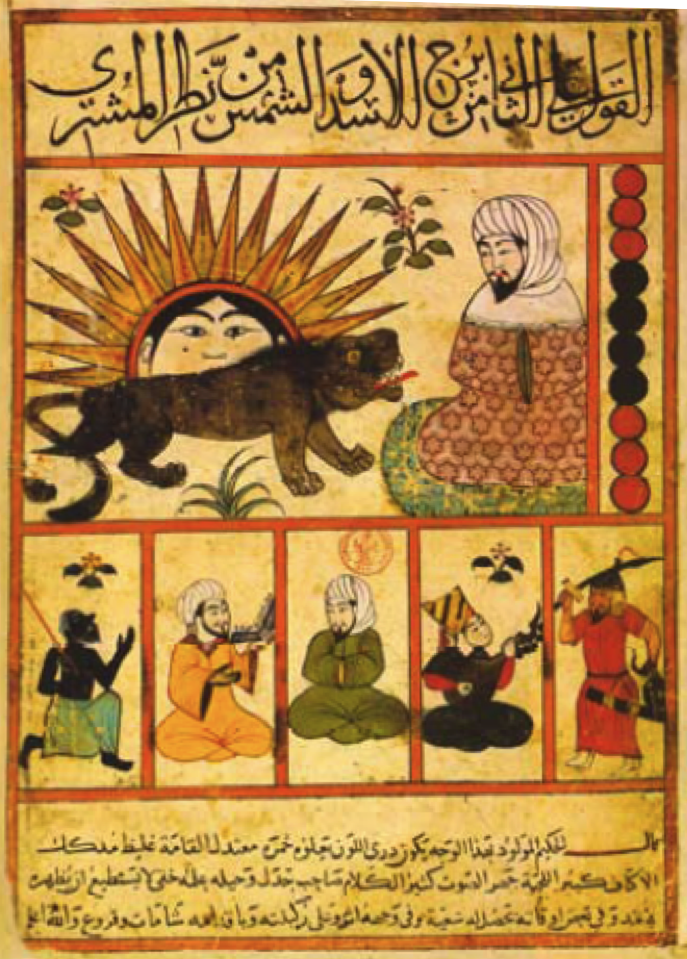
Lion and sun in the 15th-century Egyptian manuscript of 'Kitâb al-Mawâlid' (The Book of Nativities) by Abu Ma'shar (Albumasar), painted by Persian artist Qanbar' Ali al-Shirazi

Ahmad Kasravi, Mojtaba Minovi and Saeed Nafisi's vast amount of literary and archaeological evidence show that the ancient zodiacal sign of the sun in the house of Leo become a popular emblematic figure in the 12th century. (cf. Zodiacal origin, above) Fuat Köprülü suggests that the Lion and Sun on the Turkic and Mongolic flags and coins of these times are merely astrological signs and do not exemplify royalty.

=== Earliest invocation as a political symbol ===
The Lion and Sun symbol becomes first utilized as a political symbol in the 13th century, most notably on the coinage of Kaykhusraw II, who was Sultan of the Seljuk Sultanate of Rum from 1237 to 1246. These were "probably to exemplify the ruler's power." The notion that "the sun [of the symbol] symbolised the Georgian wife of the king, is a myth, for on one issue 'the sun rests on the back of two lions rampant with their tails interlaced' [...] and on some issues the sun appears as a male bust." Other chief occurrences of 12th- to 14th-century usage include: an early 13th-century luster tile now in the Louvre; a c. 1330 Mamluk steel mirror from Syria or Egypt; on a ruined 12th- to 14th-century Arkhunid bridge near Baghdad; on some Ilkhanid coins; and on a 12th- or 13th-century bronze ewer now in the Golestan palace museum. In the latter, a rayed nimbus enclosing three female faces rests on a lion whose tail ends in a winged monster.

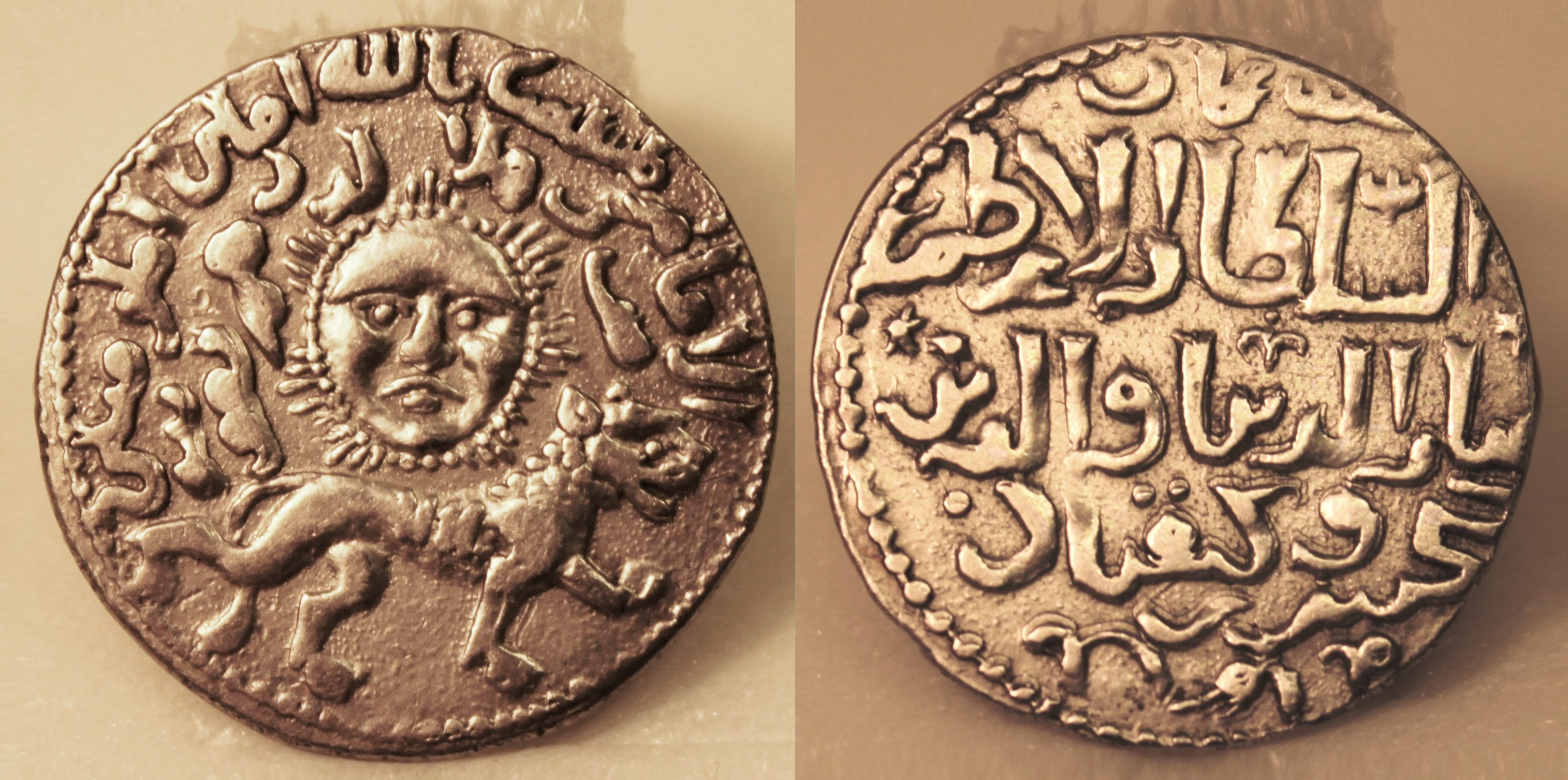
Dirham of Kaykhusraw II (r. 1239–46). Astrological Device (Sun-Lion, symbol of an ideal ruler in the Great Age of the Seljuqs) dated 638 AH (1240–41 AD). Legend in Arabic.

The use of the Lion and Sun symbol in a flag is first attested in a miniature painting illustrating a copy of Shahnameh Shams al-Din Kashani, an epic on Mongol conquest, dated 1423. The painting depicts several (Mongul?) horsemen approaching the walled city of Nishapur. One of the horsemen carries a banner that bears a lion passant with a rising sun on its back. The pole is tipped with a crescent moon. By the Safavid era (1501–1722), and the subsequent unification of Iran as a single state, the Lion and Sun had become a familiar sign, appearing on copper coins, banners, and works of art.

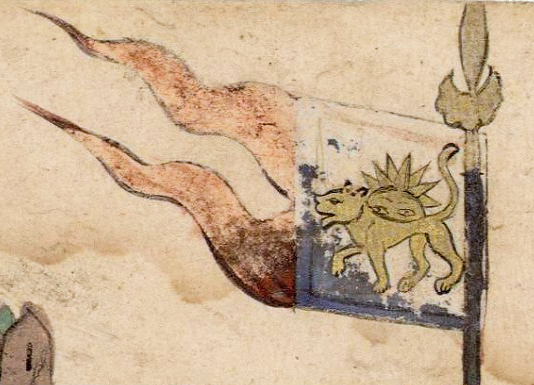
Earliest known example of a banner bearing the Lion and Sun motif (826 AH/1423 AD). Banner of the messengers of Genghis Khan to the city of Nishapur (1423 painting, colour). Supplément Persan 1443.

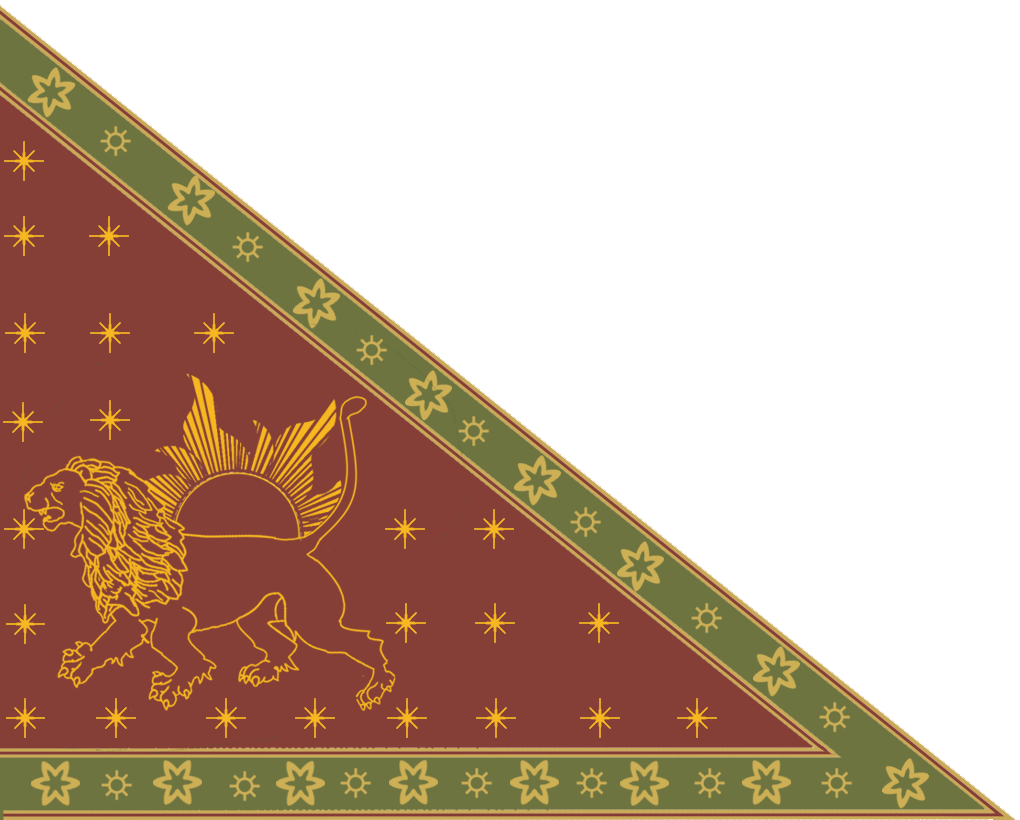
Flag of Shah Jahan, Emperor of Mughal India The Lion and Sun motif was also used on flags of Mughal India, notably those of Shah Jahan.

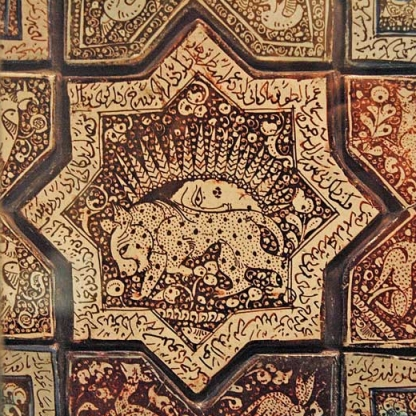
Ilkhanid tile work, Damghan, Iran

Mughal emperor Jahangir issued coins known as the "Jahangiri coins." Some series were zodiac-themed gold and silver coins bearing images of the zodiac symbols. On one side of the coins, the Persian inscription reads: "Gold found adornment in Agra through Jahangir Shah, son of Akbar Shah." On the other side, the Sun's position within the twelve zodiac constellations is depicted. The Sun's apparent movement through these constellations, as observed from Earth, gave rise to images such as the Lion and Sun, the Bull and Sun, the Goat and Sun, and others. The most famous example shows the Sun positioned on the back of Leo in the month of Mordad (July-August). The origin of the Lion and Sun symbol in Iranian history also lies in these astronomical and mythological foundations.

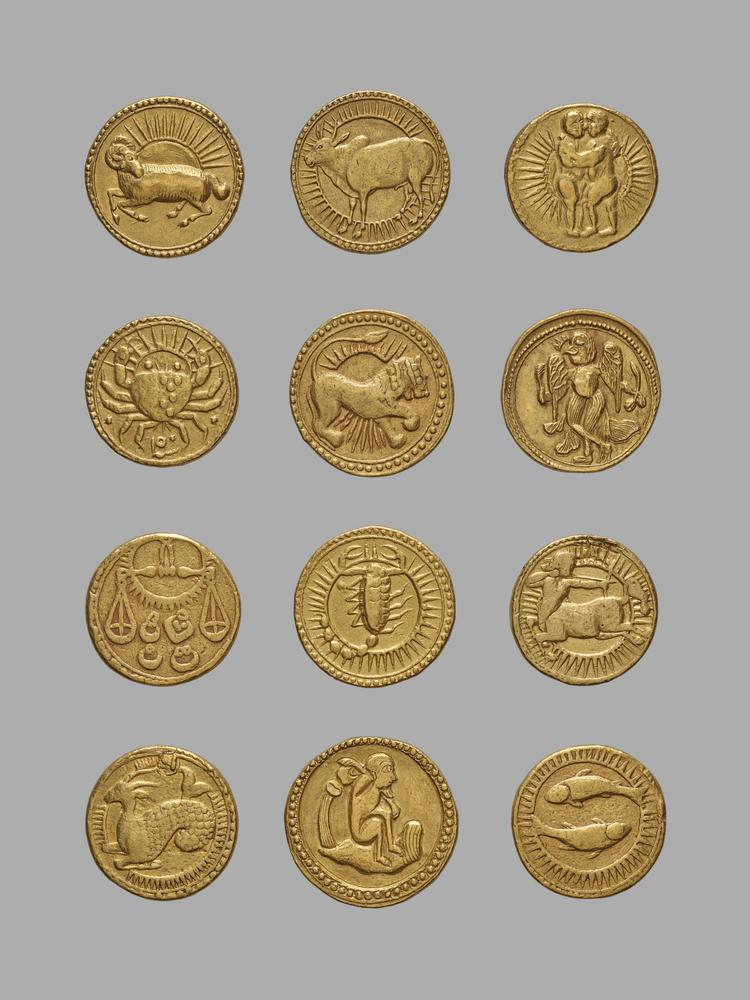
Zodiac gold coin series of Jahangir, minted in Agra.

=== Safavid dynasty ===
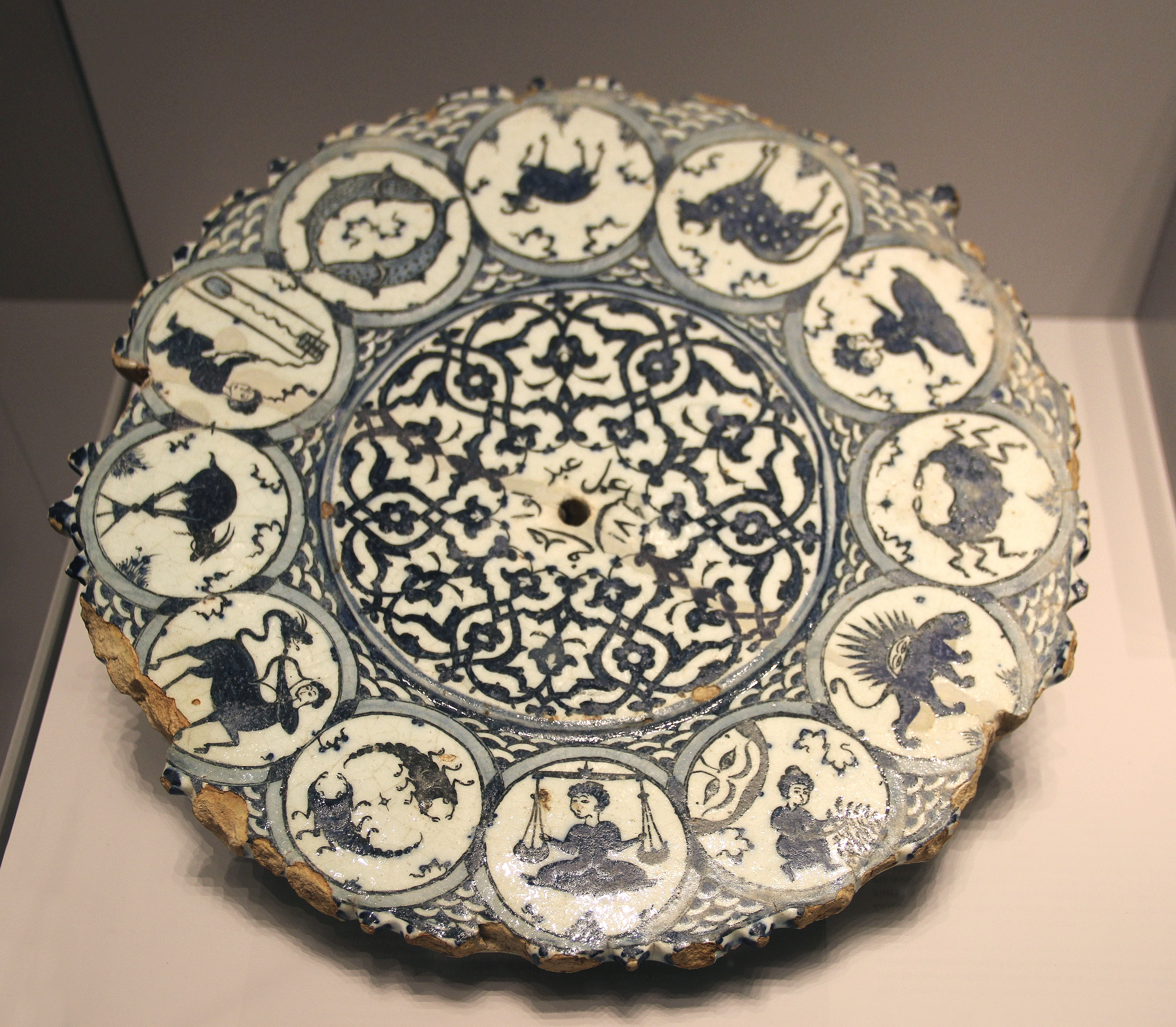
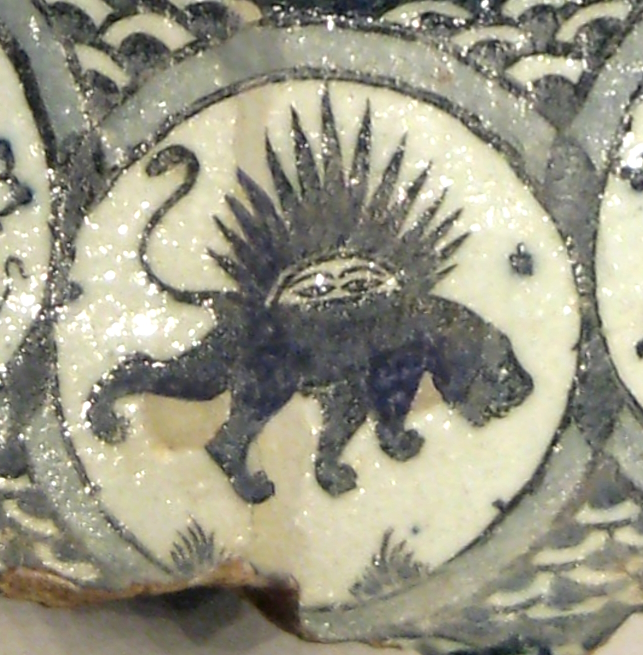
Persian zodiac containing astrological lion and sun symbol, 1563, probably Qazvin, Iran. Pergamon Museum in Berlin, Germany.

In the Safavid era, the Lion and Sun stood for the two pillars of society, state and religion. It is clear that, although various alams and banners were employed by the Safavids during their rule, especially the earlier Safavid shahs, by the time of Shah Abbas, the Lion and Sun symbol had become one of the most popular emblems.

The flag used during Shah Tahmasb I's reign, featuring a lamb and sun. It is said to have been adopted because he was born during the month of Aries. Later, it was changed to Lion and Sun.

According to Najmabadi, the Safavid interpretation of this symbol was based on a combination of mytho-histories and tales such as the Shahnameh, stories of Prophets, and other Persian sources. For the Safavids, the Shah had two roles: monarch and holy man. This double meaning was associated with the genealogy of Iranian shahs. Two males were key people in this paternity: Jamshid (mythical founder of an ancient Persian kingdom), and Ali (Shi'te first Imam). Jamshid was affiliated with the sun and Ali was affiliated with the lion (Heydar).

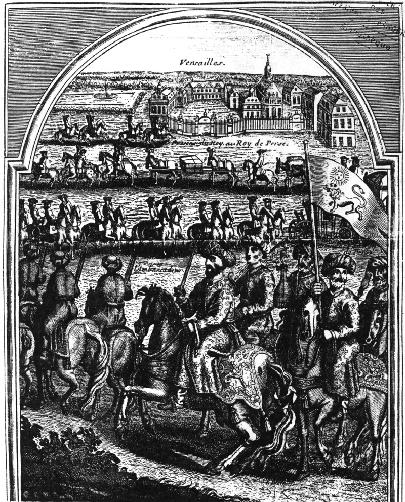
Flag of Iran carried by the Iranian delegation during Mohammad Reza Beg's entrance in Versailles, August 1715

Shahbazi suggest that the association may originally have been based on a learned interpretation of the Shahnameh's references to 'the Sun of Iran' and 'the Moon of the Turanians. (cf: the "Roman"—i.e., Byzantine—king as the "Moon of the West" in the Iranian background section). Since Ottoman sultans, the new sovereigns of 'Rum', had adopted the moon crescent as their dynastic and ultimately national emblem, the Safavids of Iran needed to have their own dynastic and national emblem. Therefore, Safavids chose the Lion and Sun motif. Besides, the Jamshid, the sun had two other important meanings for the Safavids. The sense of time was organised around the Solar System which was distinct from the Arab-Islamic lunar system. Astrological meaning and the sense of cosmos was mediated through that. Through the zodiac the sun was linked to Leo which was the most auspicious house of the sun. Therefore, for the Safavids, the sign of Lion and Sun condensed the double meaning of the Shah—king and holy man (Jamshid and Ali)—through the auspicious zodiac sign of the sun in the house of Leo and brought the cosmic-earthy pair (king and Imam) together.

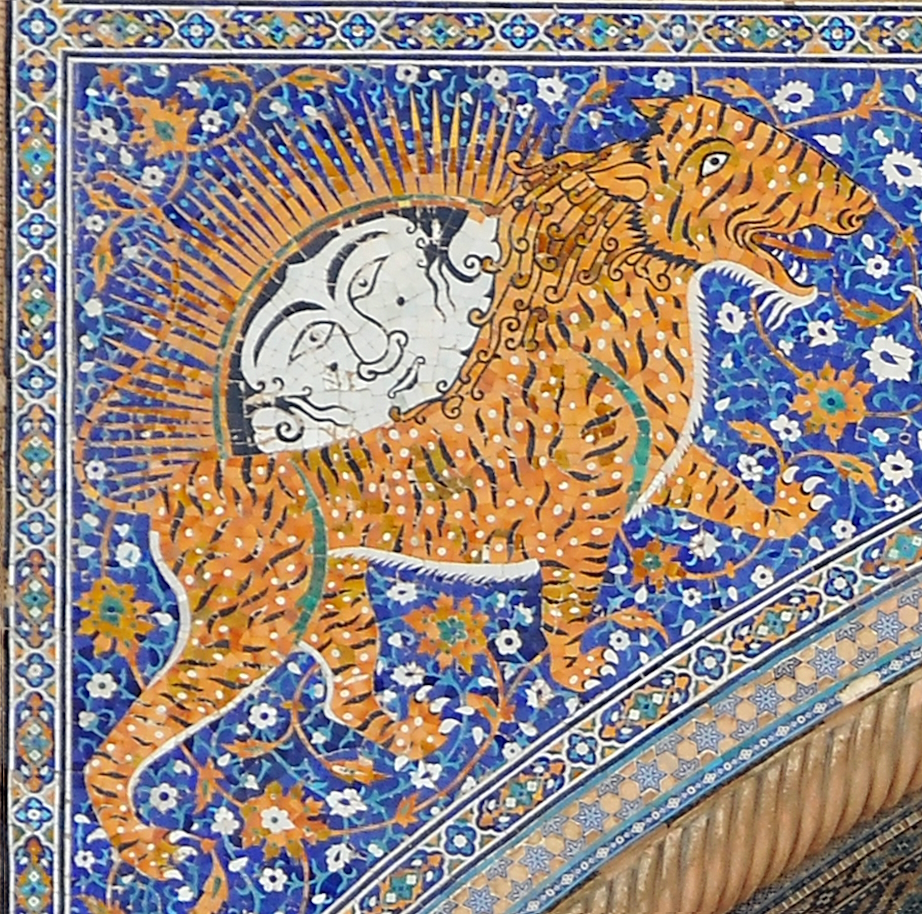
Sherdar Madrasa, Lion and Sun symbol, created in 1028 AH (1627 CE). Samarqand.

In seeking the Safavid interpretation of the Lion and Sun motif, Shahbazi suggests that the Safavids had reinterpreted the lion as symbolising Imam ʿAlī and the sun as typifying the "glory of religion", a substitute for the ancient farr-e dīn. They reintroduced the ancient concept of God-given Glory (farr), reinterpreted as "light" in a Iran with islam, and the Prophet and Ali "had been credited with the possession of a divine light of lights (nūr al-anwār) of leadership, which was represented as a blazing halo." They attributed such qualities to Ali and sought the king's genealogy through the Shia Fourth Imam's mother to the royal Sasanian house.

=== Afsharid and Zand dynasties ===
The royal seal of Nader Shah in 1746 was the Lion and Sun motif. In this seal, the sun bears the word Al-Molkollah (Arabic: The earth of God). Two swords of Karim Khan Zand have gold-inlaid inscriptions which refer to the: "... celestial lion ... pointing to the astrological relationship to the Zodiac sign of Leo ..." Another record of this motif is the Lion and Sun symbol on a tombstone of a Zand soldier.

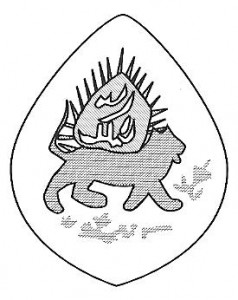
Royal seal of Nader Shah, 1764

Nader Shah's Flag

=== Qajar and Pahlavi dynasties ===
==== Iranian Interpretation ====
The earliest known Qajar Lion and Sun symbol is on the coinage of Agha Mohammad Khan Qajar, minted in 1796 on the occasion of Shah's coronation. The coin bears the name of the new shah underneath the sun and Ali (the first Shi'ite Imam) underneath the lion's belly. Both names are invoked and this coin suggest that this motif still stands for the shah (sun) and Iranian Nationality (lion), "Iranisation and Imamification of sovereignty". In the Qajar era, the emblem can be found on Jewish marriage certificates (ketubas) and Shi'ite mourning of muharram banners.

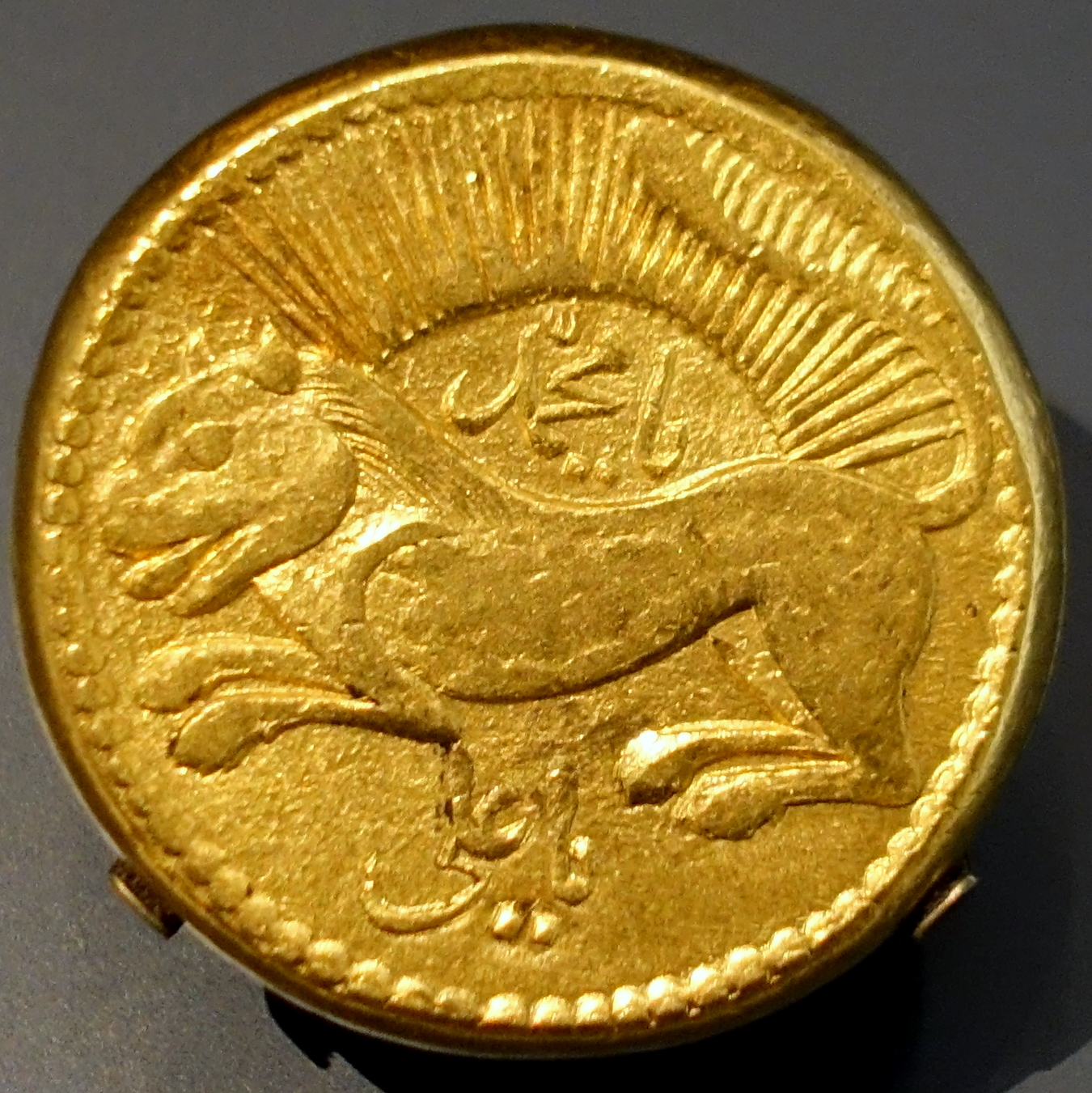
A gold coin from early 19th-century Qajar Iran, currently held at the Aga Khan Museum in Toronto.

==== Nationalistic interpretation ====
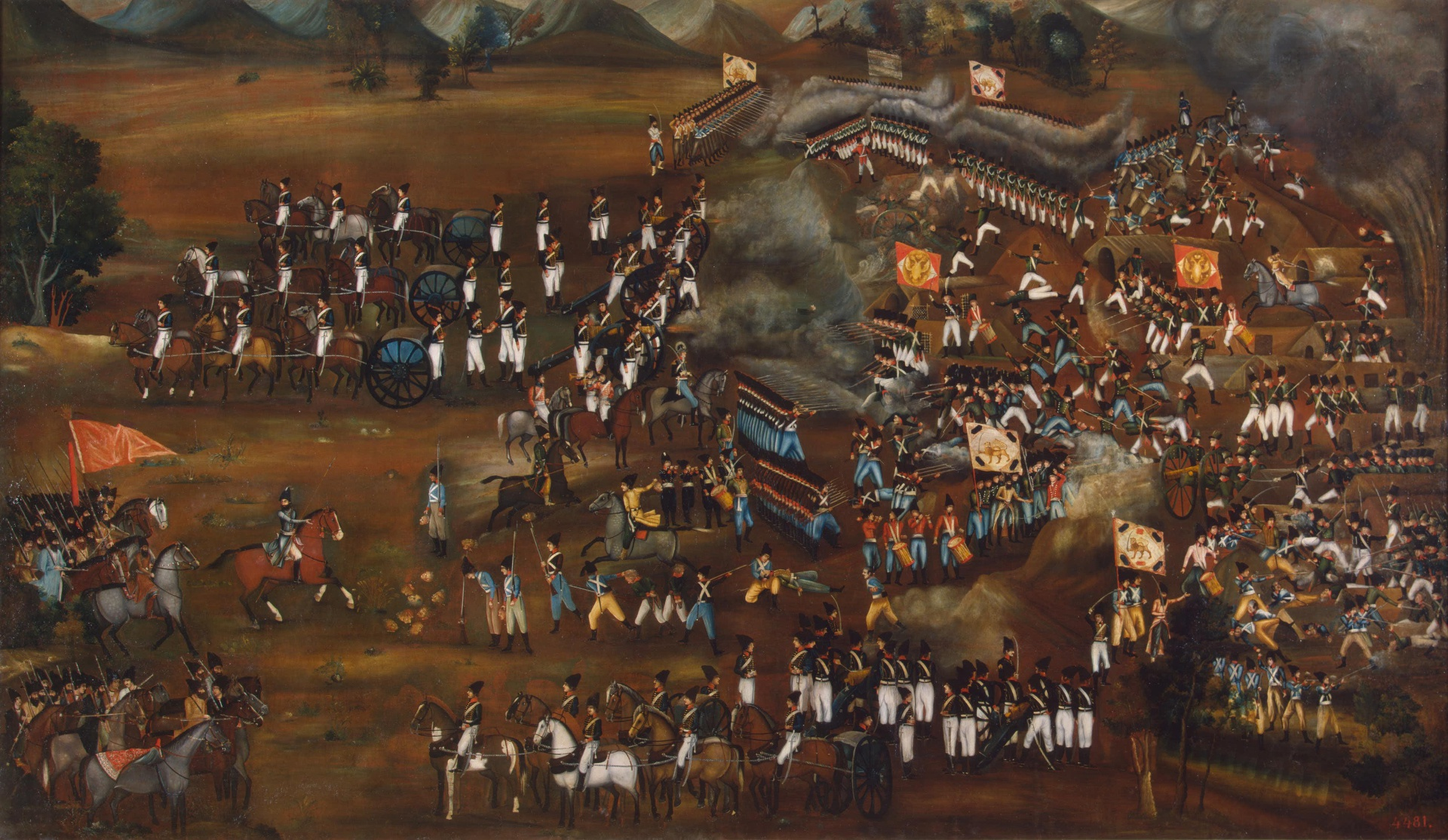
Russo-Persian War (1804–1813) – Iranian troops bearing the Lion and Sun flag

During the reign of the second Qajar shah, Fat'h Ali Shah Qajar, the beginning of a shift in political culture from the Safavid concept of rule is observed. The Persian component of the ruler was de-emphasised, if not completely abounded. This shift coincides with the first archaeological surveys of Europeans in Iran and the re-introduction of the past pre-Islamic history of Iran to Iranians. Fat'h Ali Shah tried to affiliate his sovereignty with the glorious years of pre-Islamic Iran. Literary evidence and documents from his time suggest that the sun in the Lion and Sun motif was the symbol of the shah and a metaphor of Jamshid. Referring to Rostam, the mythical hero of Iran in the Shahnameh, and the fact that lion was the symbol of Rostam, the lion received a nationalistic interpretation. The lion was the symbol of heroes of Iran who are ready to protect the country against enemies. Fat'h Ali Shah addresses the meanings of the signs in two of his poems:

Fat'h Ali shah, the Turki Shah, the universe-enlightening Jamshid
The Lord of the country Iran, the universe-adoring sun

Also:

Iran, the gorg of lions, sun the Shah of Iran
It's for this that the lion-and-sun is marked on the banner of Darius

It was also during this time that he had the Sun Throne, the imperial throne of Iran, constructed.

In the 19th century, European visitors at the Qajar court attributed the Lion and Sun to remote antiquity, which prompted Mohammad Shah Qajar to give it a "nationalistic interpretation." In a decree published in 1846, it is stated that "For each sovereign state an emblem is established, and for the august state of Persia, too, the Order of Lion and Sun has been in use, an ensign which is nearly three thousand years old—indeed dating from before the age of Zoroaster. And the reason for its currency may have been as follows. In the religion of Zoroaster, the sun is considered the revealer of all things and nourisher of the universe [...], hence, they venerated it". This is followed by an astrological rationale for having selecting the "selected the sun in the house of Leo as the emblem of the august state of Persia." The decree then claims that use of Order of the Lion and Sun had existed in Zoroastrian Zoroastrian Iran until the worship of the sun was abolished by Muslims. Piemontese suggests that in this decree, "native political considerations and anachronistic historical facts are mixed with curious astrological arguments" At the time, the Lion and Sun symbol stood the state, the monarchy, and the nation of Iran, associated all with a pre-Islamic history.

==== Lion holding a sword and Sun ====
First appearance of Lion holding a sword and Sun on coins, was during the reign of Mohammad Shah Qajar. (see coin 1 coin 2)

==== Seated Lion and Sun ====
Throughout Qajar dynasty, a seated Lion and Sun appeared on flags and coins. (see flag, coin 1, coin 2, coin 3, coin 4)

==== Order of the Lion and the Sun ====
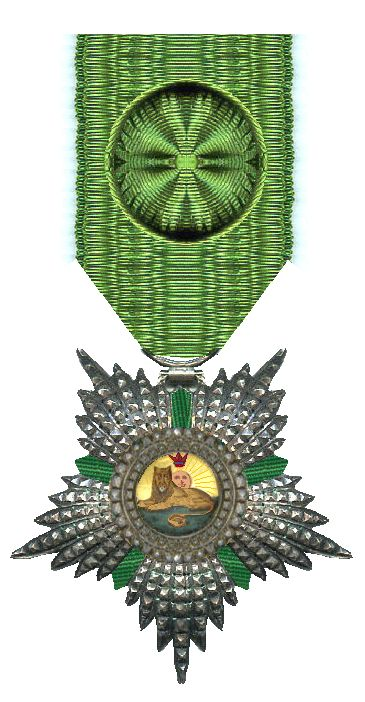
The Imperial Order of the Lion and the Sun

The Imperial Order of the Lion and the Sun was instituted by Fat’h Ali Shah of the Qajar dynasty in 1808 to honour foreign officials (later extended to Iranians) who had rendered distinguished services to Iran.

==== Substantial changes in the motif ====
Another change under the second and third Qajar shahs was the Africanisation of the motif. At this time, the lion was an African lion which had a longer mane and bigger body compared to the Persian lion. Yahya Zoka suggests that this modification was influenced by contact with Europeans.

According to Shahbazi, the Zu'l-faqar and the lion decorated the Iranian flags at the time. It seems that towards the end of Fath' Ali Shah's reign the two logos were combined and the lion representing Ali was given Ali's saber, Zu'l-faqar.

According to Najmabadi, occasionally we come across the Lion and Sun with a sword in the lion's paw and with a crown during this period. The Mohammad Shah's decree in 1836 states that the lion must erectly stand, bear a saber ("to make it explicitly stands for the military prowess of the state"). The crown was also added as a symbol of royalty rather than for any particular Qajar monarch. The decree states that the emblem is at once the national, royal, and the state emblem of Iran. In this period the lion was depicted as more masculine and the sun was female. Before this time the sun could be male or female and the lion was represented as a swordless, friendly and subdued seated animal.

The crown over the Lion and Sun configuration consolidated the association of the symbol with the monarchy. The sun lost its importance as the icon of kingship and the Kiani Crown became the primary symbol of the Qajar monarchy. Under Naser al-Din Shah Qajar, logos varied from seated, swordless lions to standing and sword-bearing lions. In February 1873, the decree for Order of Aftab (Neshan-e Aftab) was issued by Naser al-Din Shah.

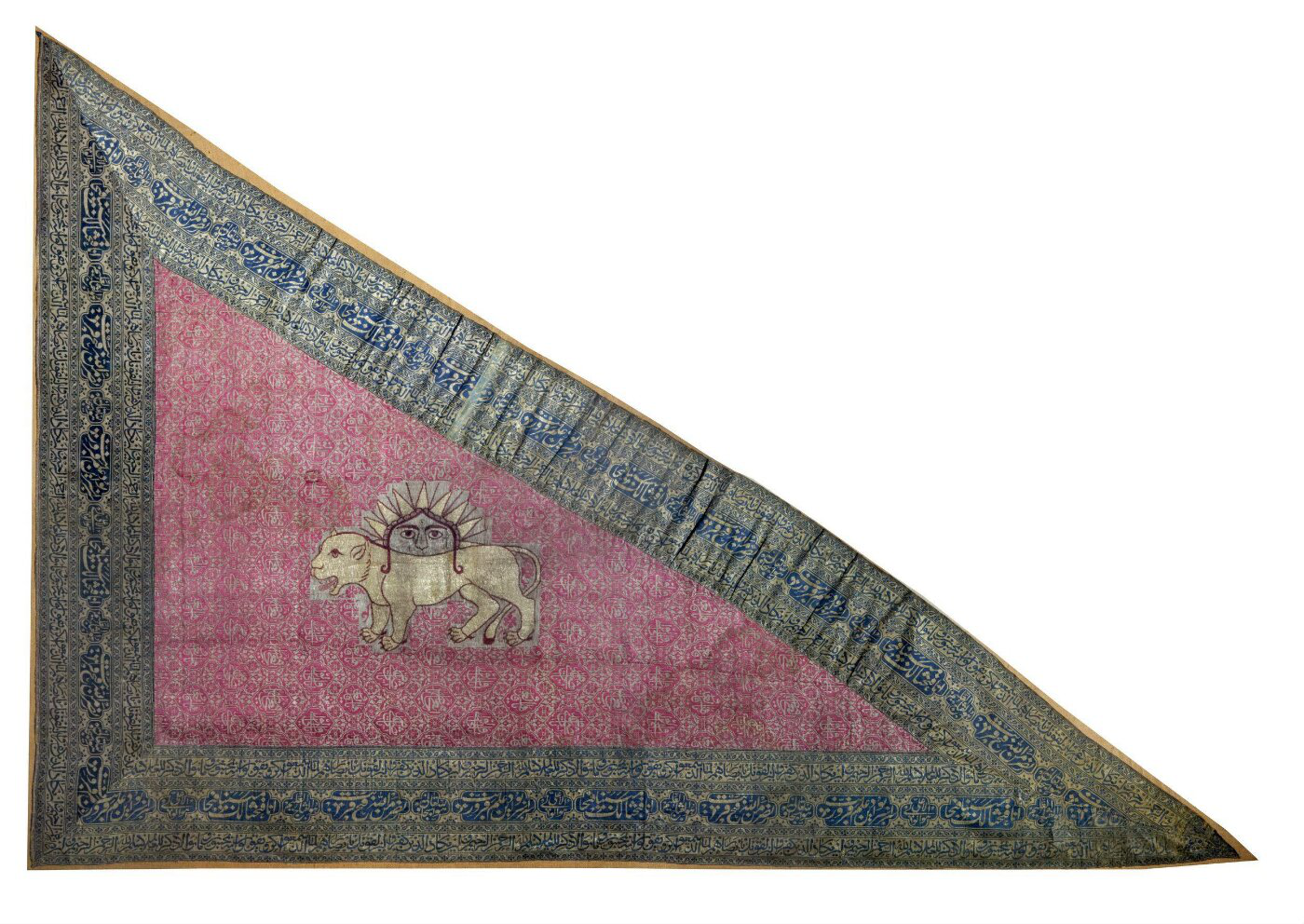
Triangular silk flag of Iran, Qajar dynasty, 3.6 m by 2.03 m, mid-19th century, Quranic verses and the ground pious invocations can be found on edges

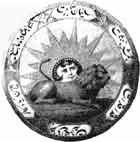
Emblem of Iran during Fat'h Ali Shah's reign

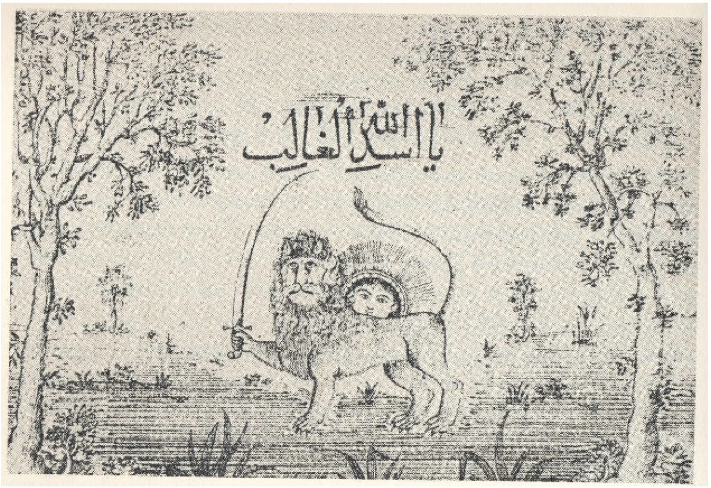
Logo of Akhbardar al-Khalafah-i Tehran Newspaper, 5 February 1851

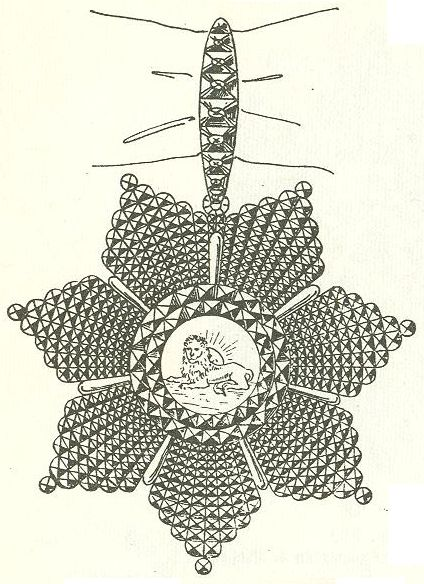
Order of the Lion and the Sun in Qajar era

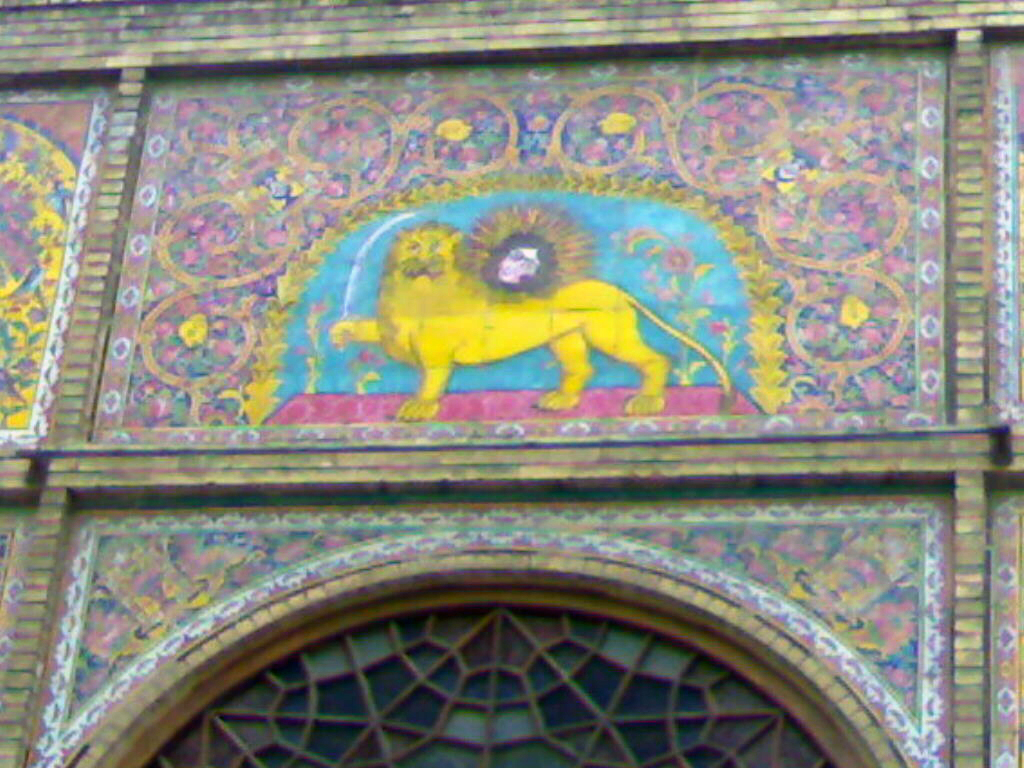
The lion and Sun, Golestan Palace, Qajar dynasty

The flag of Iran with a Lion and Sun design in the early 20th century

==== After the Constitutional Revolution ====
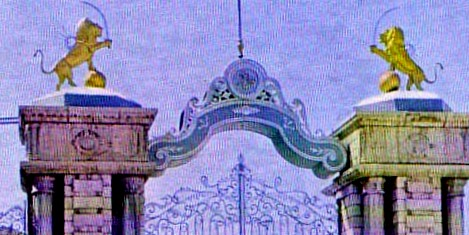
The entrance gate of the Iranian Parliament in the mid-20th century

In the Fifth Amendment to the Constitution of 1906, the Lion and Sun motif in the flag of Iran was described as a passant lion that holds a saber in its paw and with the sun in its background. A decree dated September 4, 1910, specified the exact details of the logo, including the lion's tail ("like an italic S"), the position and the size of the lion, his paw, the sword, and the sun.

Najmabadi observes a parallel symbolism on wall hangings produced between the lion/sun and Reza Khan/motherland, after Reza Khan's successful coup. The coy sun is protected by the lion and Rezakhan is the hero who should protect the motherland. Under Reza Shah the sun's female facial features were removed and the sun was portrayed more realistically and merely with rays. In the military contexts the Pahlavi Crown was added to the motif.

The Pahlavis adopted the Lion and Sun emblem from Qajars, but they replaced the Kiani Crown with the Pahlavi Crown. Persian symbolism was reintroduced to the motif. As is discussed in Persian traditions, the lion had been the symbol of kingship and symbol of Rostam's heroism in Shahnameh.

The many historical meanings of the emblem, while provide a solid ground for its power as the national emblem of Iran, have also provided the rich ground for competing symbols of Iranian identity. One important campaign to abolish the emblem was initiated by Mojtaba Minuvi in 1929. In a report prepared at the request of the Iranian embassy in London, he insisted that the Lion and Sun is Turkic in origin. He recommended that the government replaces it with Derafsh-e-Kaviani: "One cannot attributed a national historical story to the lion-and-sun emblem, for it has no connection to ancient pre-Islamic history, there is no evidence that Iranians designed or created it.... We might as well get rid of this remnant of the Turkish people and adopt the flag that symbolises our mythical grandeur, that is Derafsh-e-Kaviani". His suggestion was ignored. The symbol was challenged during World War I, while Hassan Taqizadeh was publishing the Derafsh-e-Kaviani newspaper in Berlin. In his newspaper, he argued that the Lion and Sun is neither Iranian in origin nor very ancient as people assume. He insisted that the Lion and Sun should be replaced by the more Iranian symbol of Derafsh-e-Kaviani.

State and civil flag of the Imperial State of Iran

War flag of the Imperial State of Iran

Naval jack of the Imperial State of Iran

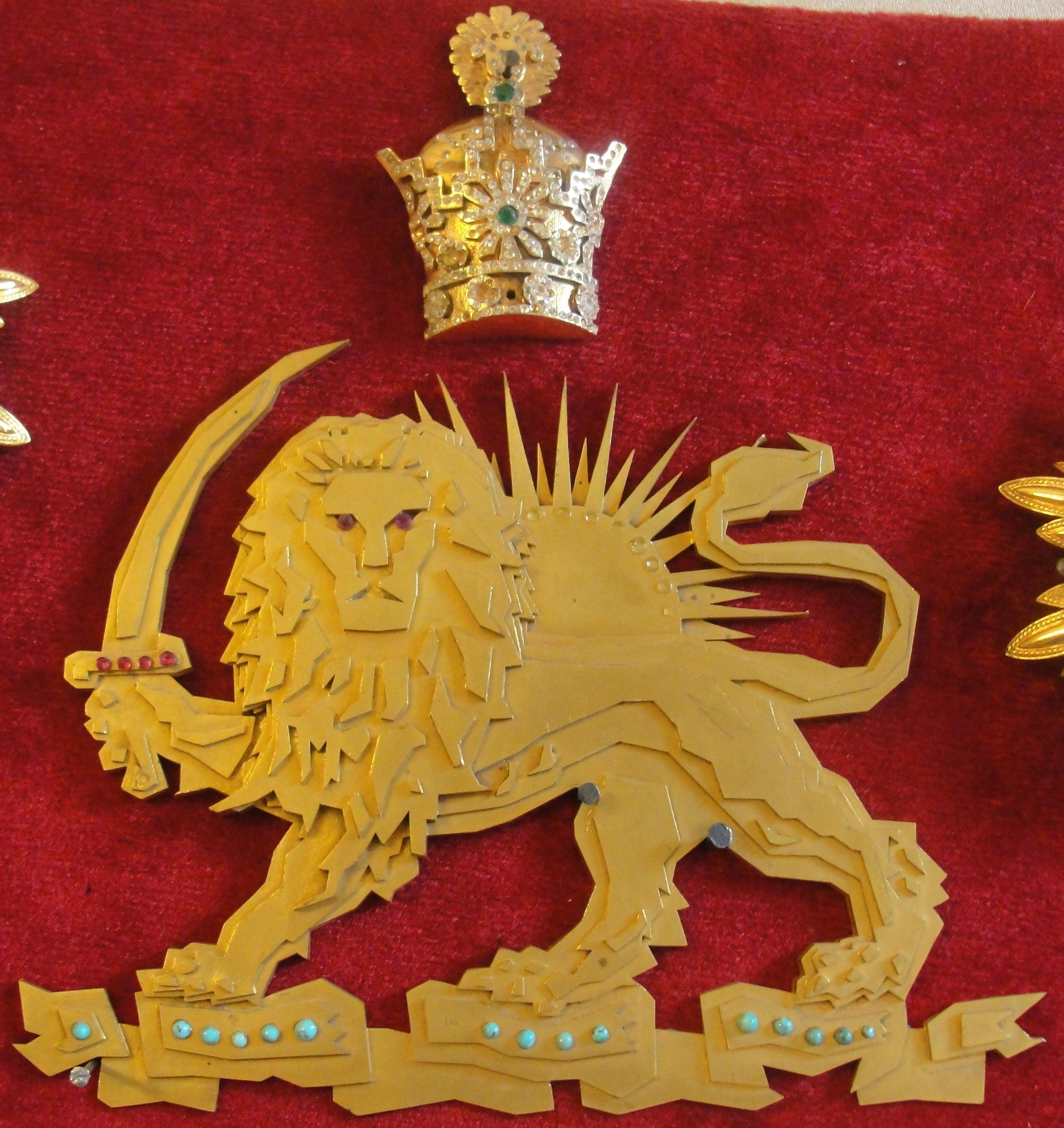
A Lion and Sun insignia in Niavaran Palace, Tehran

== Standardization of the Lion and Sun ==
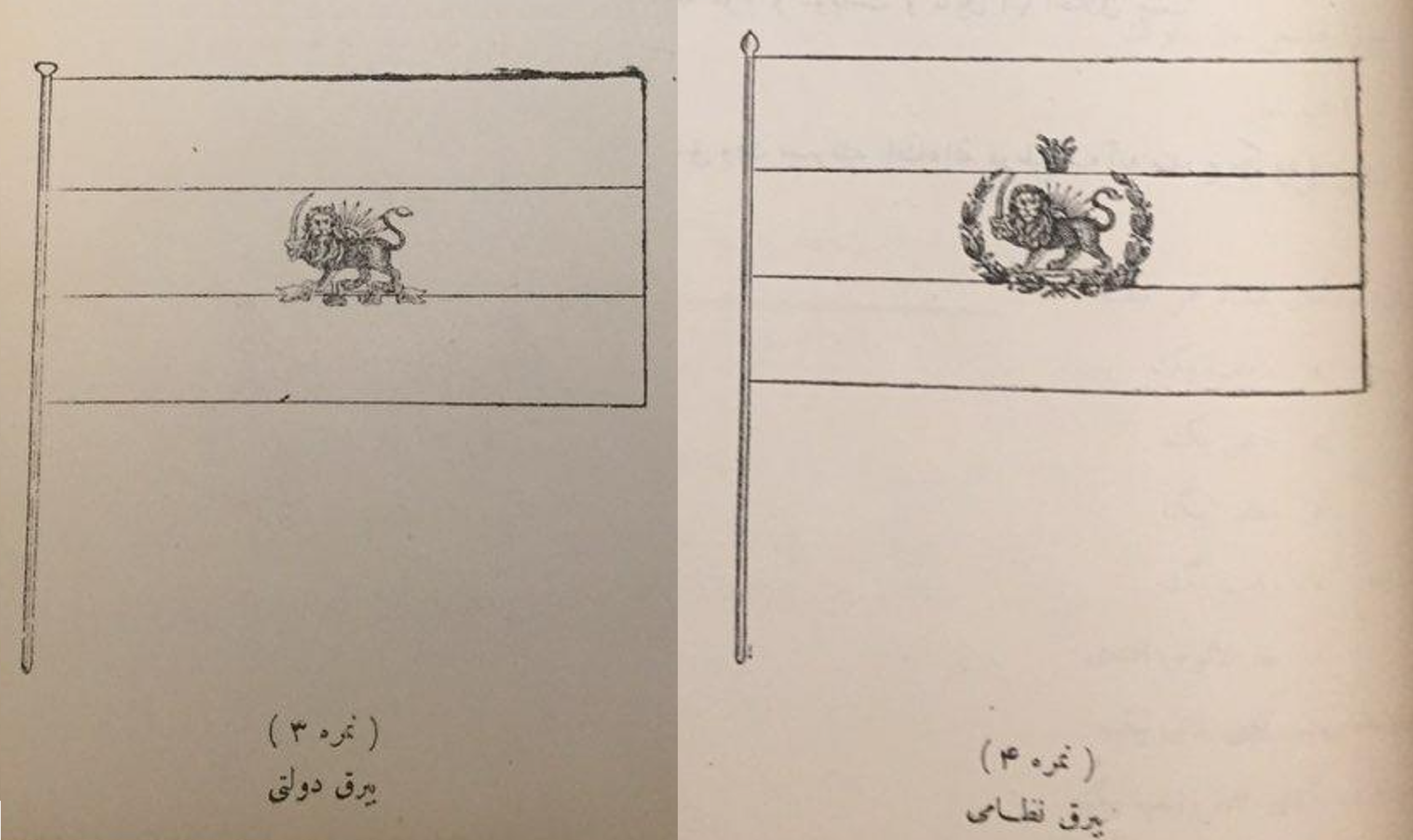
Illustrations from the 8 September 1910 Regulations of the Flags of the Sublime State of Iran, showing the state flag and the war flag as officially defined.

In a regulation dated 8 September 1910, the details of the Lion and Sun emblem—including the manner of drawing the lion’s tail (in the form of an italic S), and the position and size of the lion, sword, and sun—were specified.

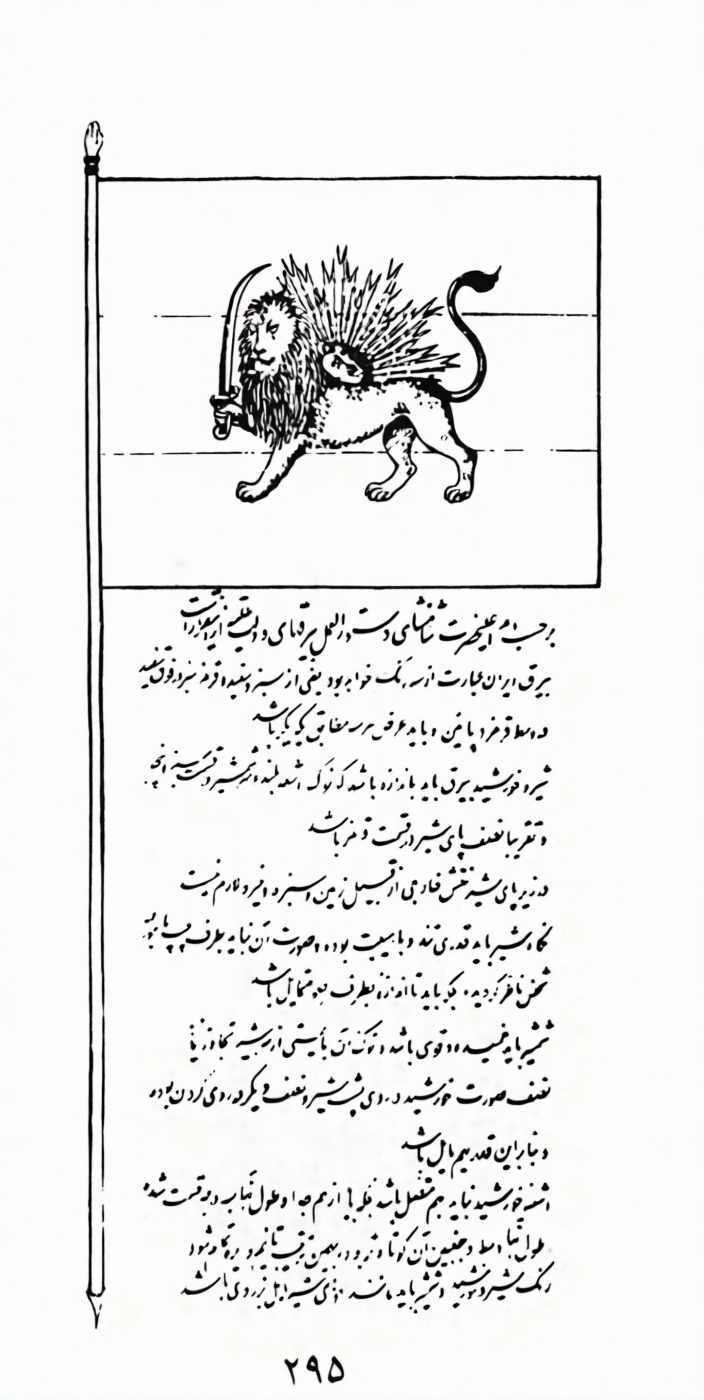
Specification of the Lion and Sun flag from the "Instructions for the Flags of the Sublime State of Iran", an official government manual defining the design, proportions, and graphical details of Iranian state flags.

At the end of the article “The Lion and Sun: The Official Emblem of the State of Iran” by Ebrahim Mokalla, various images of Lion and Sun motifs have been collected. According to the accompanying notes, one of these images appears to belong to the “Instructions for the Flags of the Sublime State” (Dastur al-‘Amal-e Beyraqhā-ye Dowlat-e ‘Aliyyeh), which was prepared to standardize the form of Iran’s flag at the time. The date of this regulation is unknown. According to these instructions, the arrangement of the three colours of the flag was the same as its present configuration; the Lion and Sun were drawn large enough to extend across all three green, white, and red bands; nothing was depicted beneath the lion’s feet; the lion was painted in three-quarter profile; and an oblique human face was drawn within the sun.

In a regulation dated 7 January 1958, the characteristics of the Iranian flag were described as follows: “The Lion and Sun motif, in golden yellow, is placed in the centre of the flag on the white section and is drawn in such a way that the lion’s head faces toward the flagpole, the sword is held vertically in the lion’s hand, and the lion’s feet are directed toward the red band. On one side of the flag, where the lion’s head faces to the viewer’s left, the sword is in the lion’s right hand, the lion’s gaze is inclined to the left, and the lion’s tail is shaped like an italic S with a curve upward. On the other side of the flag, the reverse applies; that is, the sword is in the lion’s left hand, the lion’s gaze is inclined to the right, and the lion’s tail is the mirror image of an italic S. The Lion and Sun on both sides of the flag must correspond exactly. Beneath the lion’s feet, extending from the line of the sword to the point where an imaginary perpendicular line descending from the tip of the lion’s tail would intersect, a straight line proportional to the dimensions of the image is drawn.”

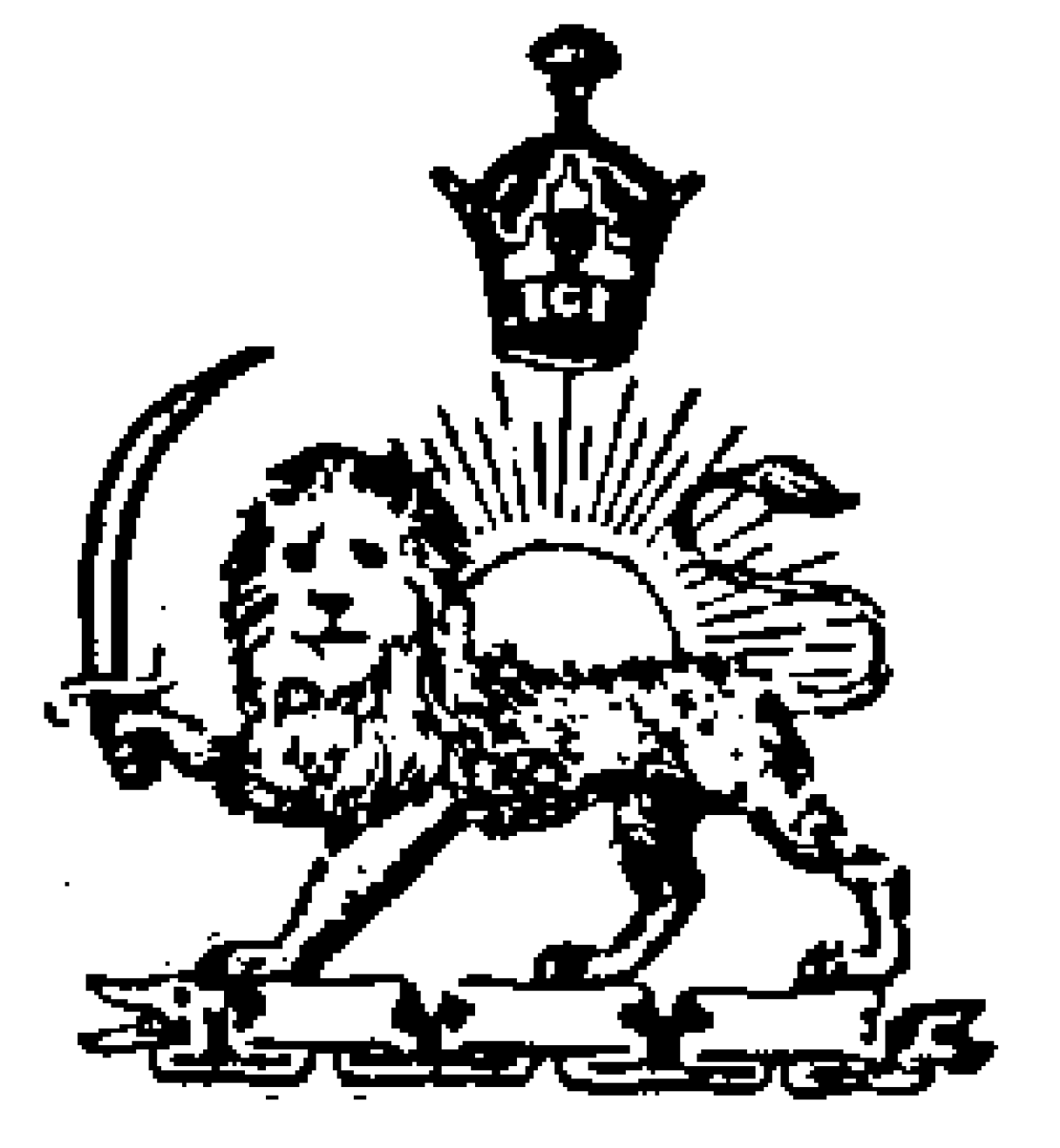
Standardized Lion and Sun emblem of Iran according to the 1959 official flag regulation

In another regulation dated 14 February 1959, the Lion and Sun were placed upon a folded ribbon instead of a horizontal line. According to Yahya Zoka, in 1965 (1344 SH), a commission was formed at the Institute of Standards and Industrial Research of Iran to establish official standards for the Iranian flag. In this standard, the lion’s support was once again described as a line rather than a folded ribbon.

=== Modernist stylized design of the 1970s ===
Stylized Lion and Sun with Pahlavi Crown designed in 1970's

In the 1970s—the final period of constitutional monarchy in Iran—a modernist stylized design was used in official documents, postage stamps, birth certificate (civil registry), the Prime Minister’s aircraft, the entrance of the Prime Minister’s palace, and the national flag of Iran. During the 1970s, the lion's form was modified and redrawn in a neater style, in accordance with modern graphic design conventions. The design was also retained during the early period of the Iranian Revolution, when the Lion and Sun continued to be used on state flags and as the state emblem.

This design continued in use into the early period of the Islamic Republic. On 30 January 1980, with the introduction of the first emblem of the Islamic Republic of Iran, the Lion and Sun were officially abandoned. Visual evidence of this design is presented below.

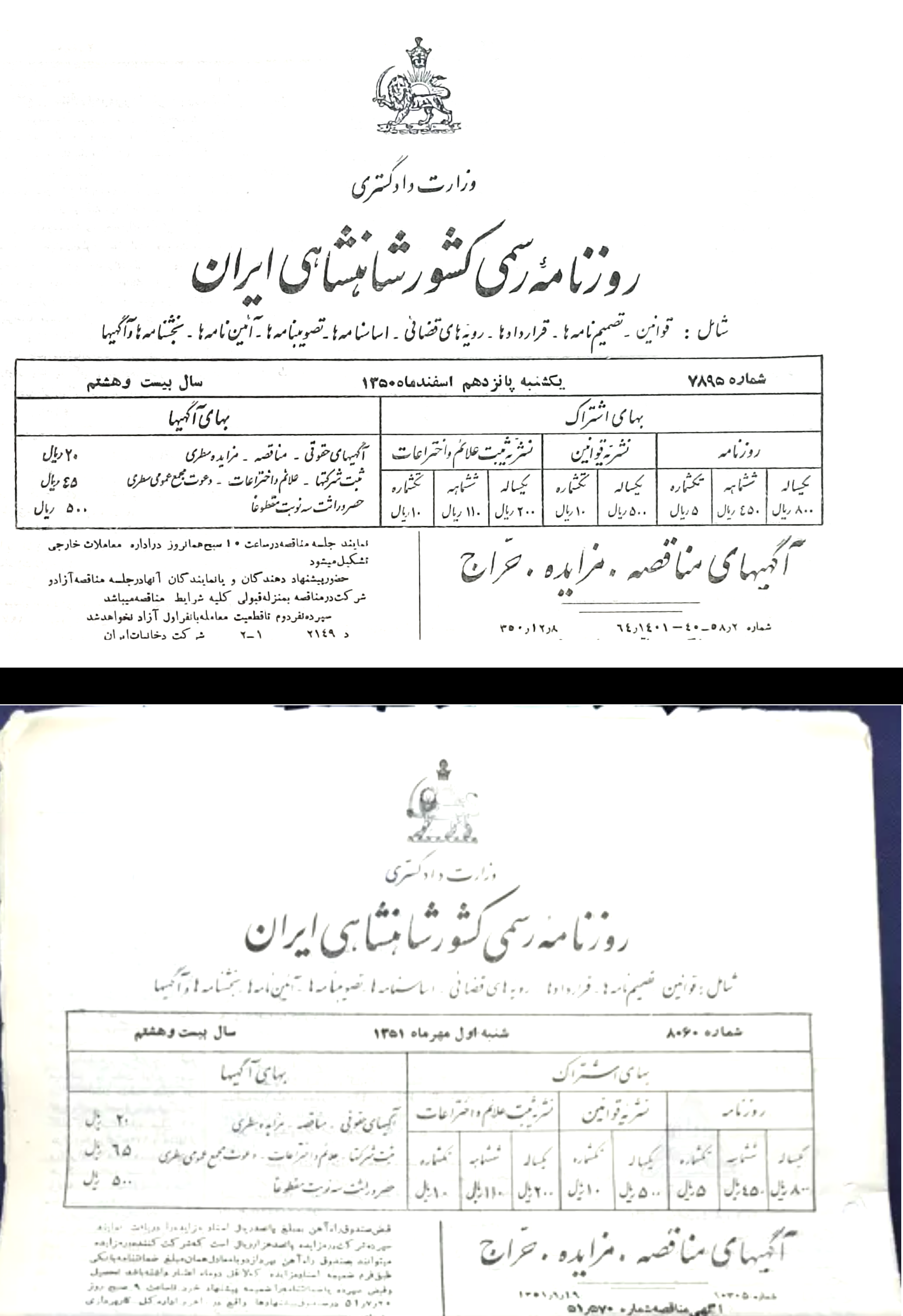
Front pages of the official newspaper of the Imperial State of Iran dated 5 March 1972 and 23 September 1972, showing the transition from the older Lion and Sun emblem to a modernist stylized graphic version in the masthead.

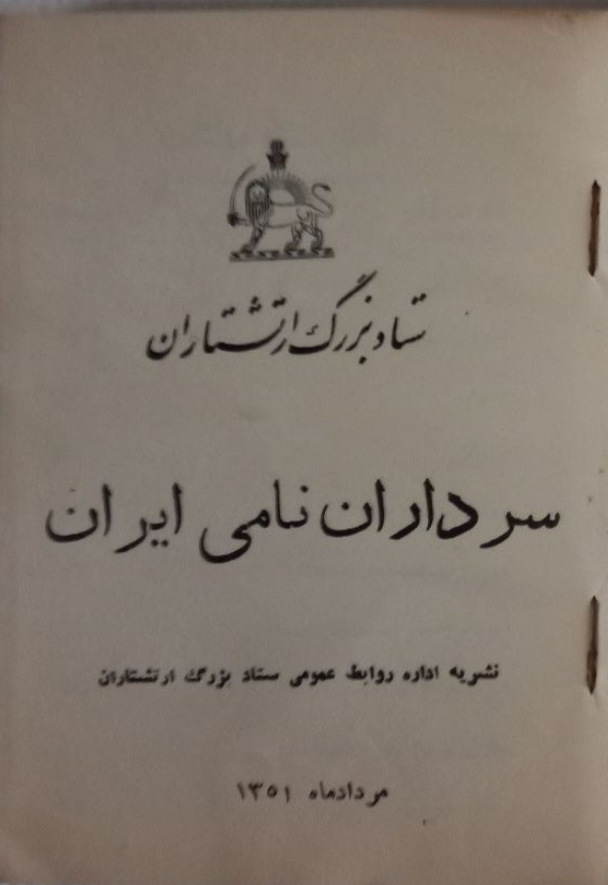
Stylized Lion and Sun emblem on the cover of Sardaran-e Nami-ye Iran, published by Imperial Iranian Armed Forces General Staff, July/August 1972

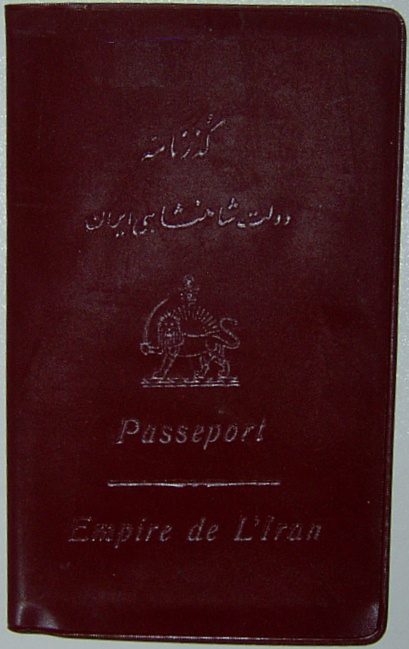
Imperial State of Iran Passport

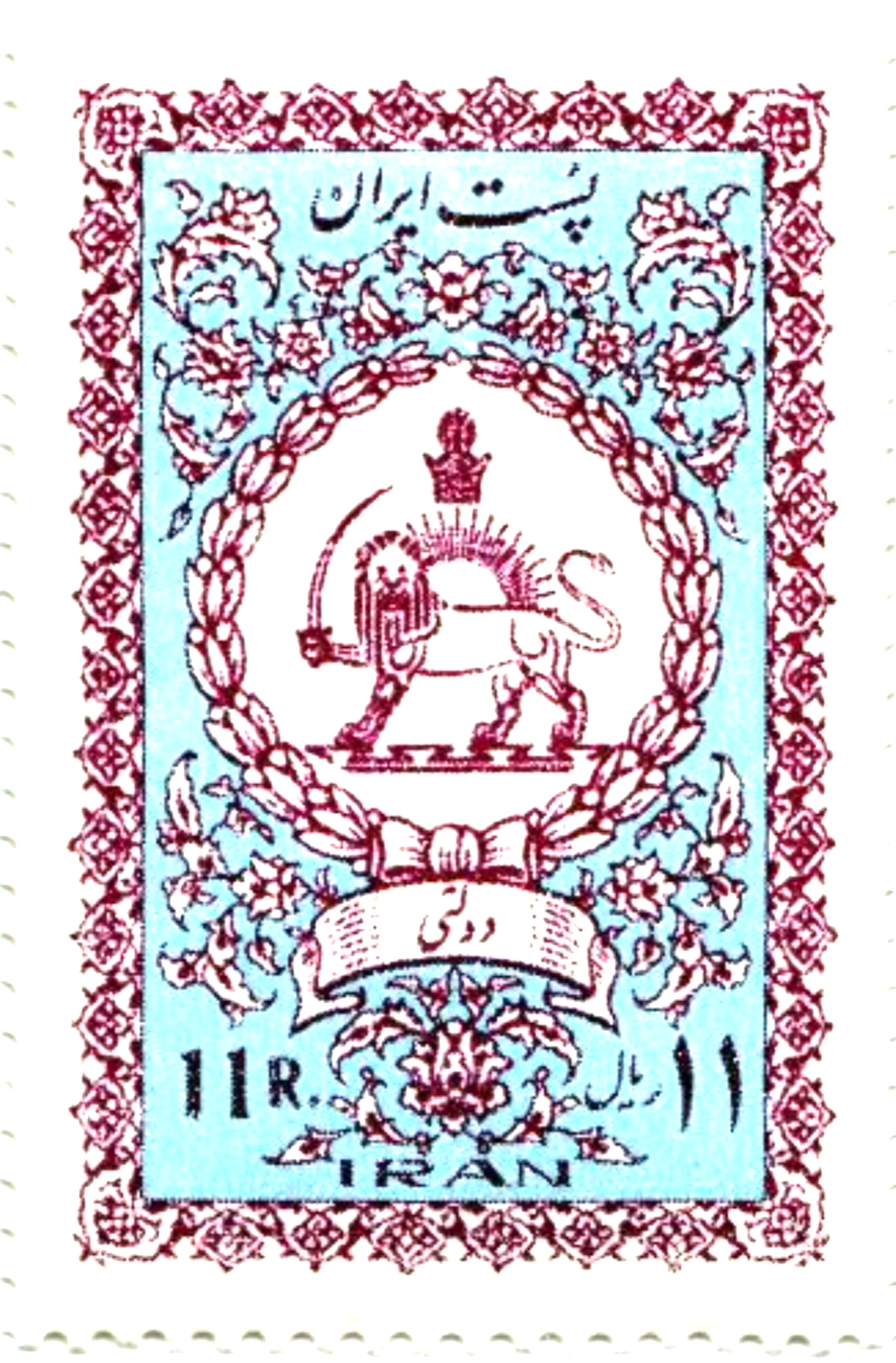
Iranian postage stamp depicting the stylized Lion and Sun emblem, issued by the Iranian Post on 25 February 1974.

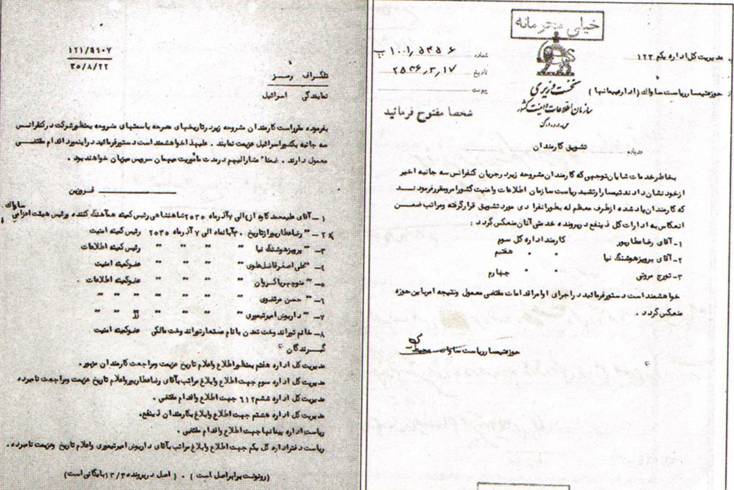
Official document letterhead

Prime Minister Shapur Bakhtiar's interview on 28 January 1979

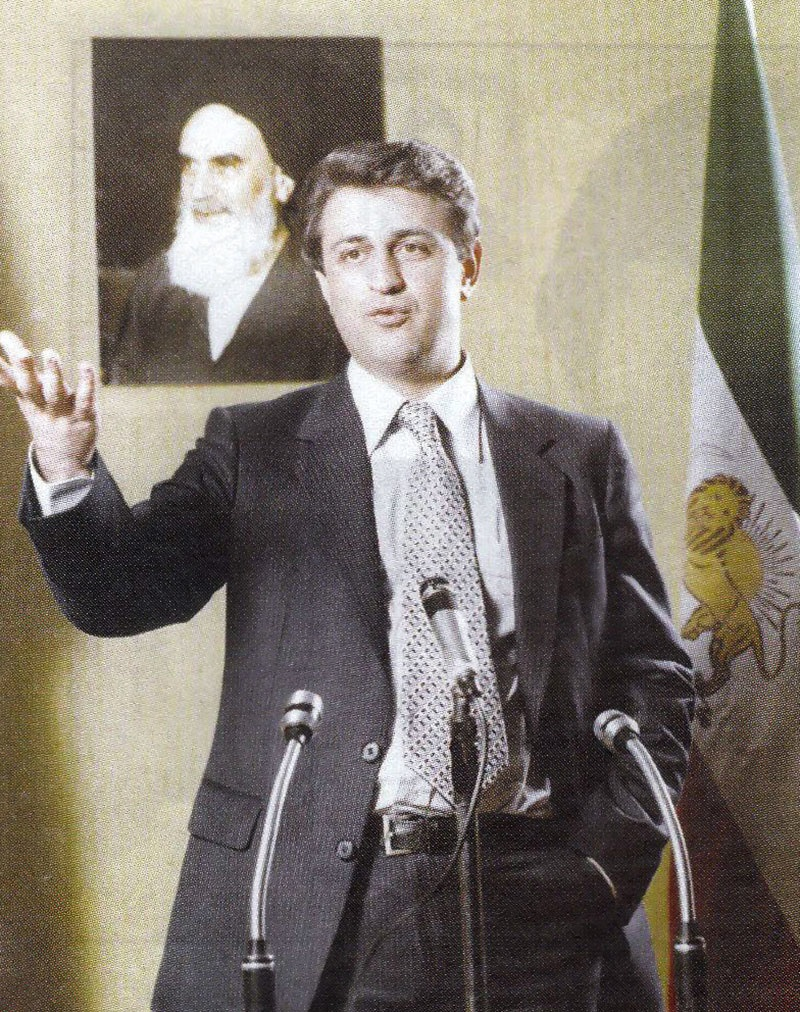
Sadegh Tabatabaei at a press conference with the media regarding the referendum in February or March 1979 (very shortly after the victory of the 1979 Revolution)

=== After the 1979 revolution ===
In its early days, the interim government still used the Lion and Sun flag

Removal of the Pahlavi crown from the war flag of Iran after the 1979 revolution

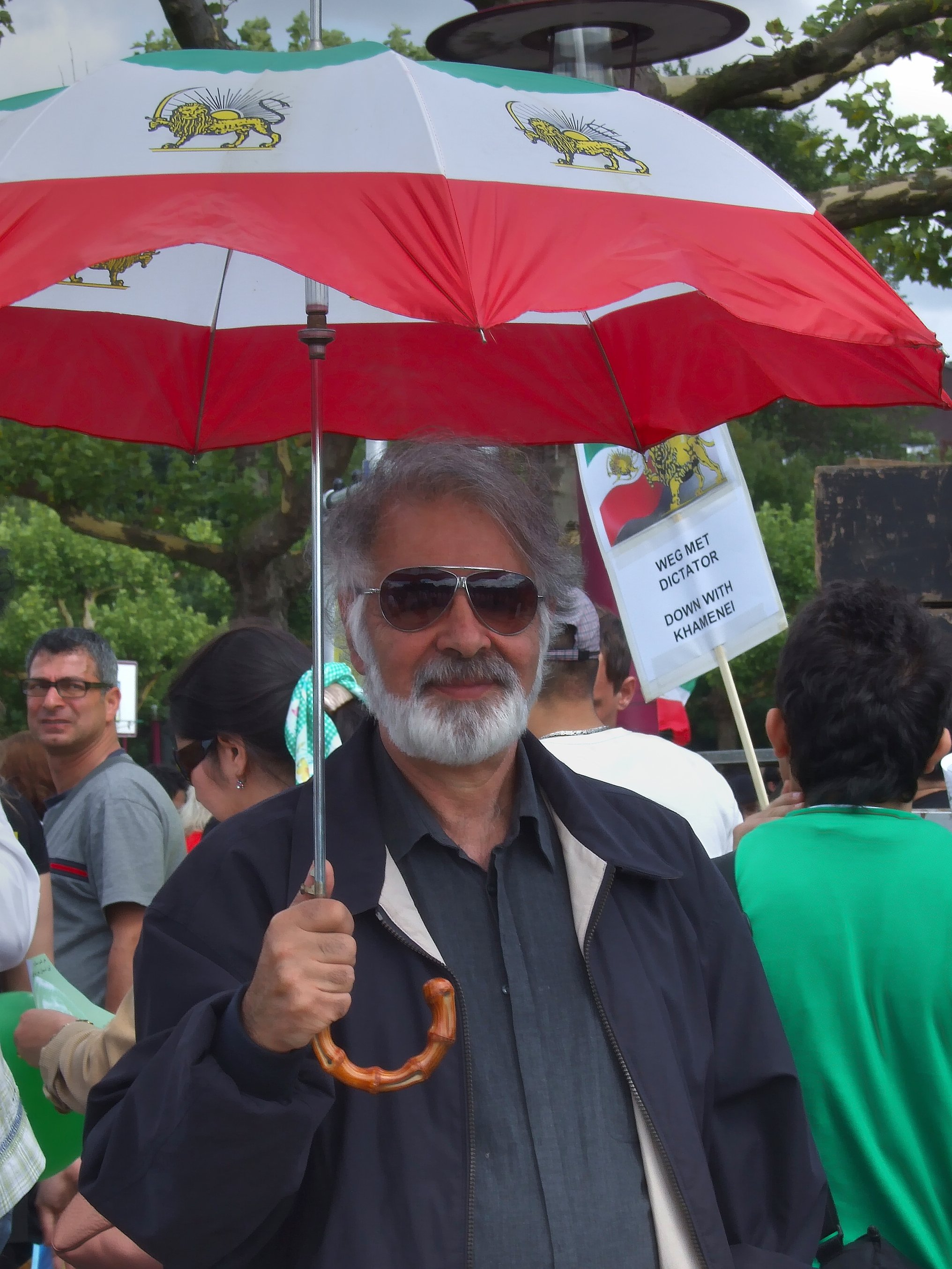
Iranian diaspora's use of the Lion and Sun emblem on Iranian flags

The Lion and Sun remained the official emblem of Iran until after the 1979 Islamic Revolution, when the Lion and Sun symbol was—by decree—removed from public spaces and government organizations and replaced by the present-day Emblem of the Islamic Republic. For the Islamic revolution, the Lion and Sun symbol allegedly resembled the "oppressive Westernising monarchy" that had to be replaced, despite the fact the symbol had old Shi'a meanings and the lion was associated with Ali. In the present day, the lion and the sun emblem is still used by a segment of the Iranian community in exile as the symbol of opposition to the Islamic Republic. Several exiled opposition groups, including the monarchists and MEK, use the Lion and Sun emblem. In Los Angeles and cities with large Iranian communities the Lion and Sun emblem is largely used on mugs, Iranian flags, and souvenirs to an extent that far surpasses its display during the years of monarchy in the homeland. During the Mahsa Amini protests in 2022, a number of alternative variant versions of the Lion and Sun were proposed to distinguish the images of new Iran from its historical adaptation of Lion and Sun.

In recent years, some Islamic Republic officials claim the Lion and Sun as a symbol of Islam in an effort to undermine the ongoing 2025–2026 Iranian protests as the Lion itself represents Imam Ali. However, the Lion and Sun motif has been in display during the Achaemenid Empire. During the protests in Iran as well as the diaspora protests, the Lion and Sun flag was extensively displayed.

== International recognition ==
The officially recognised but currently unused emblem of the International Red Cross and Red Crescent Movement in Iran.

The Lion and Sun is an officially recognised but currently unused emblem of the International Red Cross and Red Crescent Movement. The Red Lion and Sun Society of Iran (جمعیت شیر و خورشید سرخ ایران) was admitted to the International Red Cross and Red Crescent Movement in 1929.

On 4 September 1980, the newly proclaimed Islamic Republic replaced the Red Lion and Sun with the Red Crescent, consistent with most other Muslim nations. Though the Red Lion and Sun has now fallen into disuse, Iran has in the past reserved the right to take it up again at any time; the Geneva Conventions continue to recognise it as an official emblem, and that status was confirmed by Protocol III in 2005 even as it added the Red Crystal.

== In literature ==
- Anton Chekhov has a short story titled "The Lion and the Sun". The story is about a mayor who had "long been desirous of receiving the Persian order of The Lion and the Sun".

== Clavis Artis ==
Clavis Artis (Latin for "Key of the Art") is a mysterious, heavily illustrated 18th-century German alchemical manuscript, frequently attributed to a "Zoroaster". Spanning three volumes, it acts as a practical and philosophical guide to alchemy, featuring unique watercolors of dragons, lion-devouring-sun imagery, and laboratory tools. It contains many depictions of the Lion and Sun.

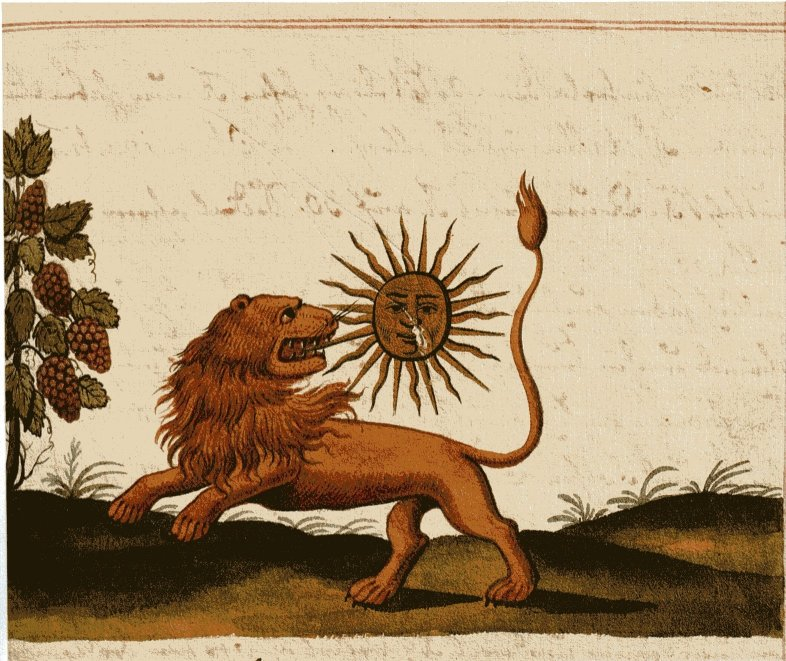
Image of the Zoroaster Clavis Artis manuscript, MS. Verginelli-Rota, Library of the Accademia Nazionale dei Lincei, Rome, vol. 2, p. 15, c.1738

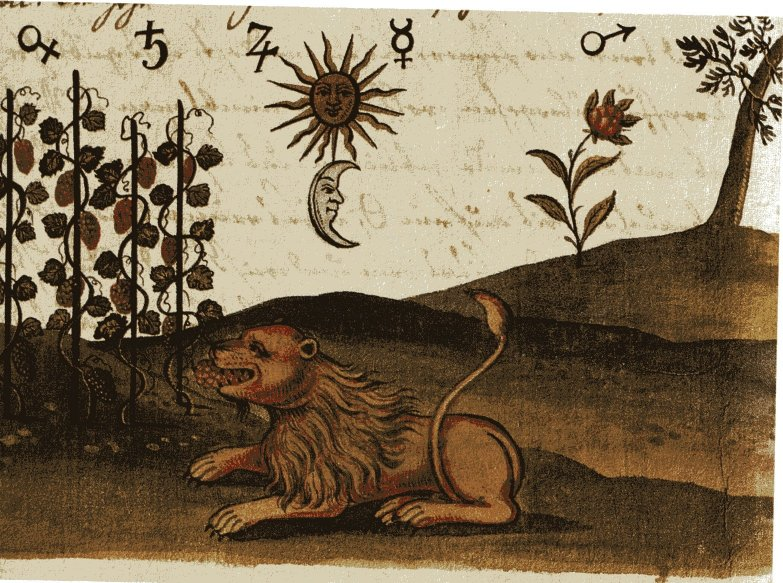
Image of the Zoroaster Clavis Artis manuscript, MS. Verginelli-Rota, Library of the Accademia Nazionale dei Lincei, Rome, vol. 2, p. 204, c.1738

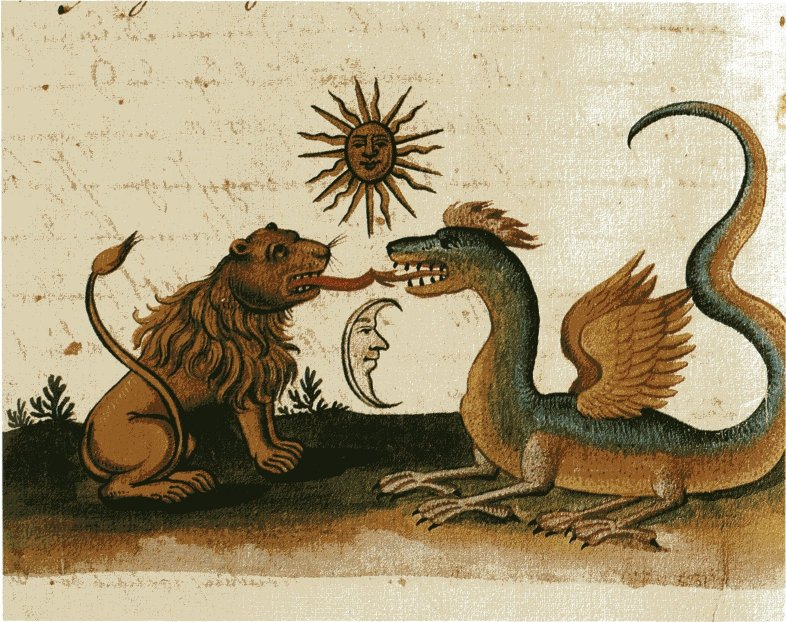
Image of the Zoroaster Clavis Artis manuscript, MS. Verginelli-Rota, Library of the Accademia Nazionale dei Lincei, Rome, vol. 2, p. 214, c.1738

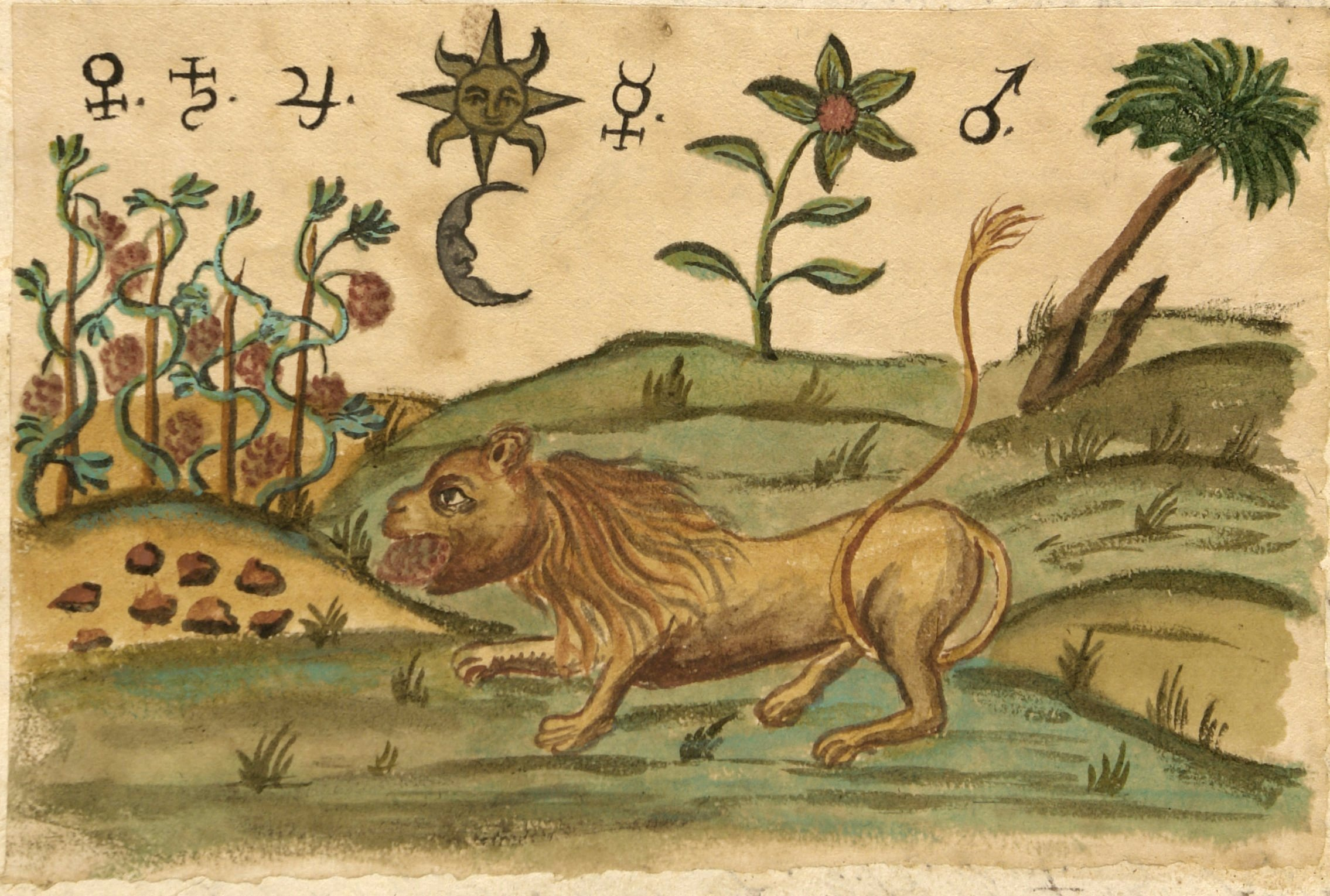
Image of the manuscript Zoroaster Clavis Artis, Ms-2-27, Biblioteca Civica Hortis, Trieste, vol. 2, pag. 175, c.1738

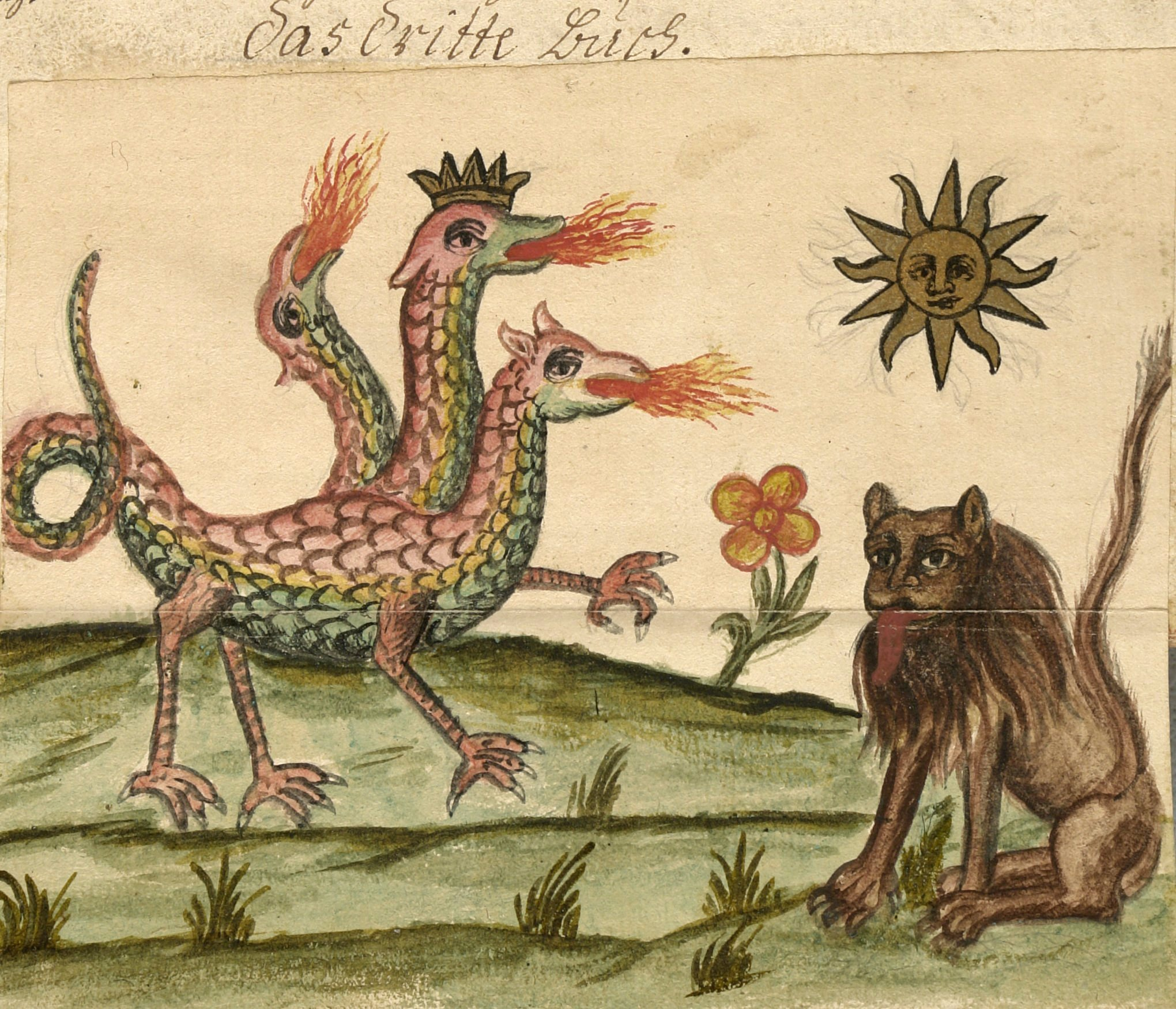
Image of the manuscript Zoroaster Clavis Artis, Ms-2-27, Biblioteca Civica Hortis, Trieste, vol. 3, pag. 39, c.1738

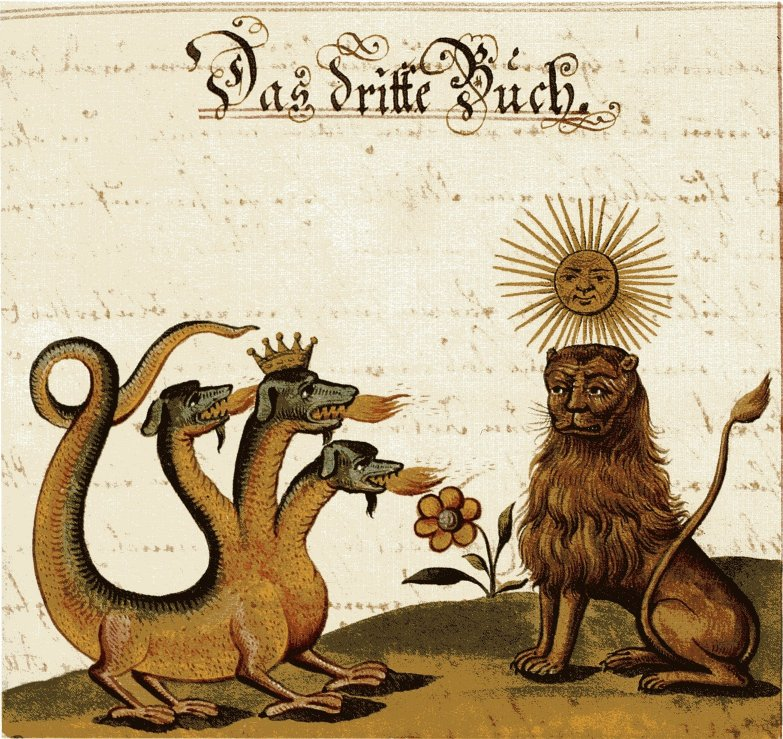
Image of the Zoroaster Clavis Artis manuscript, MS. Verginelli-Rota, Library of the Accademia Nazionale dei Lincei, Rome, vol. 3, p. 43, c.1738

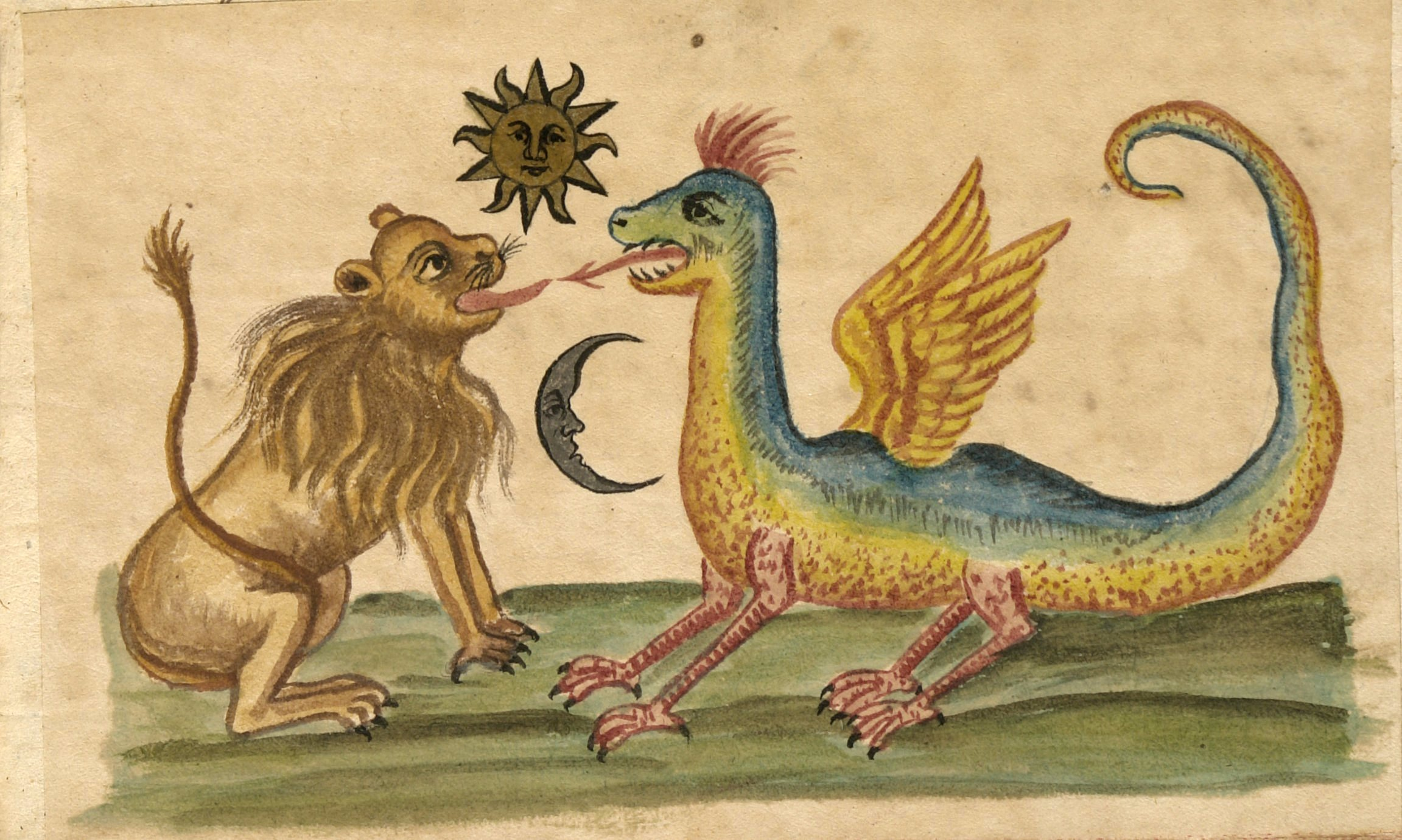
Image of the manuscript Zoroaster Clavis Artis, Ms-2-27, Biblioteca Civica Hortis, Trieste, vol. 2, pag. 182, c.1738

== Gallery ==
=== Use as state symbols outside of Iran ===
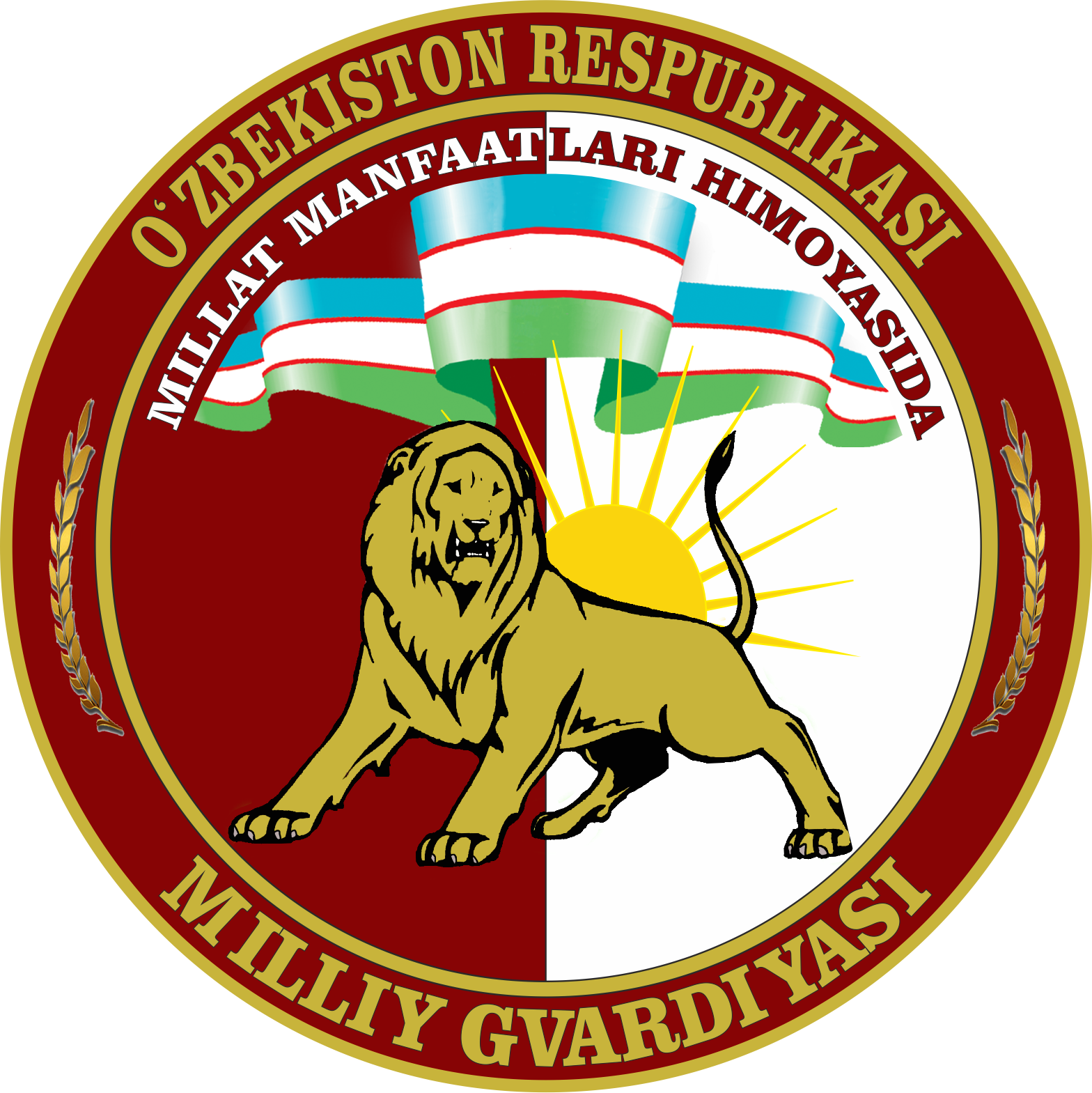
Emblem of the Uzbekistan National Guard

Emblem of Samarkand, Uzbekistan

Coat of arms of Tajikistan (1992–1993)

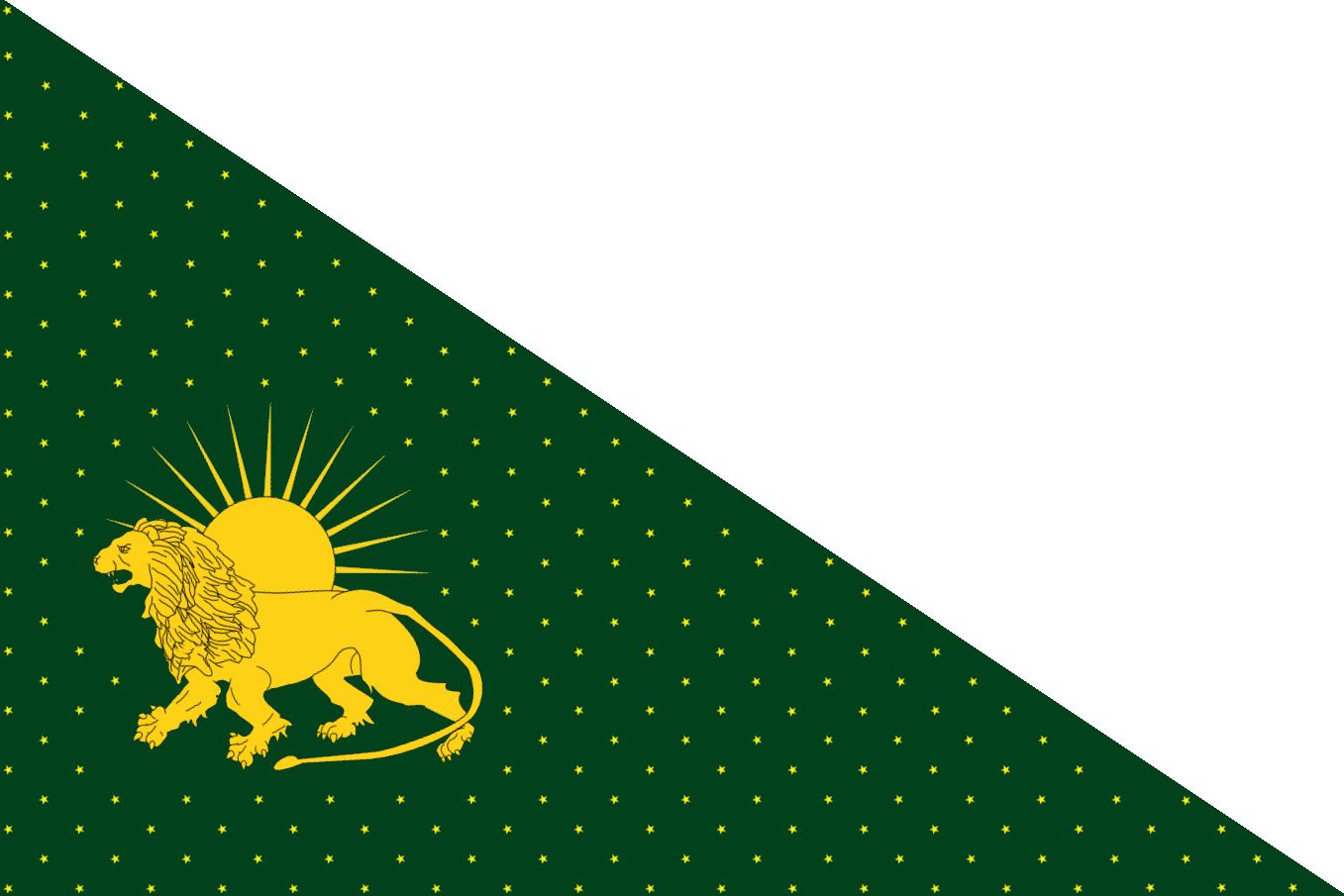
Flag of Mughal Empire (1526–1857)

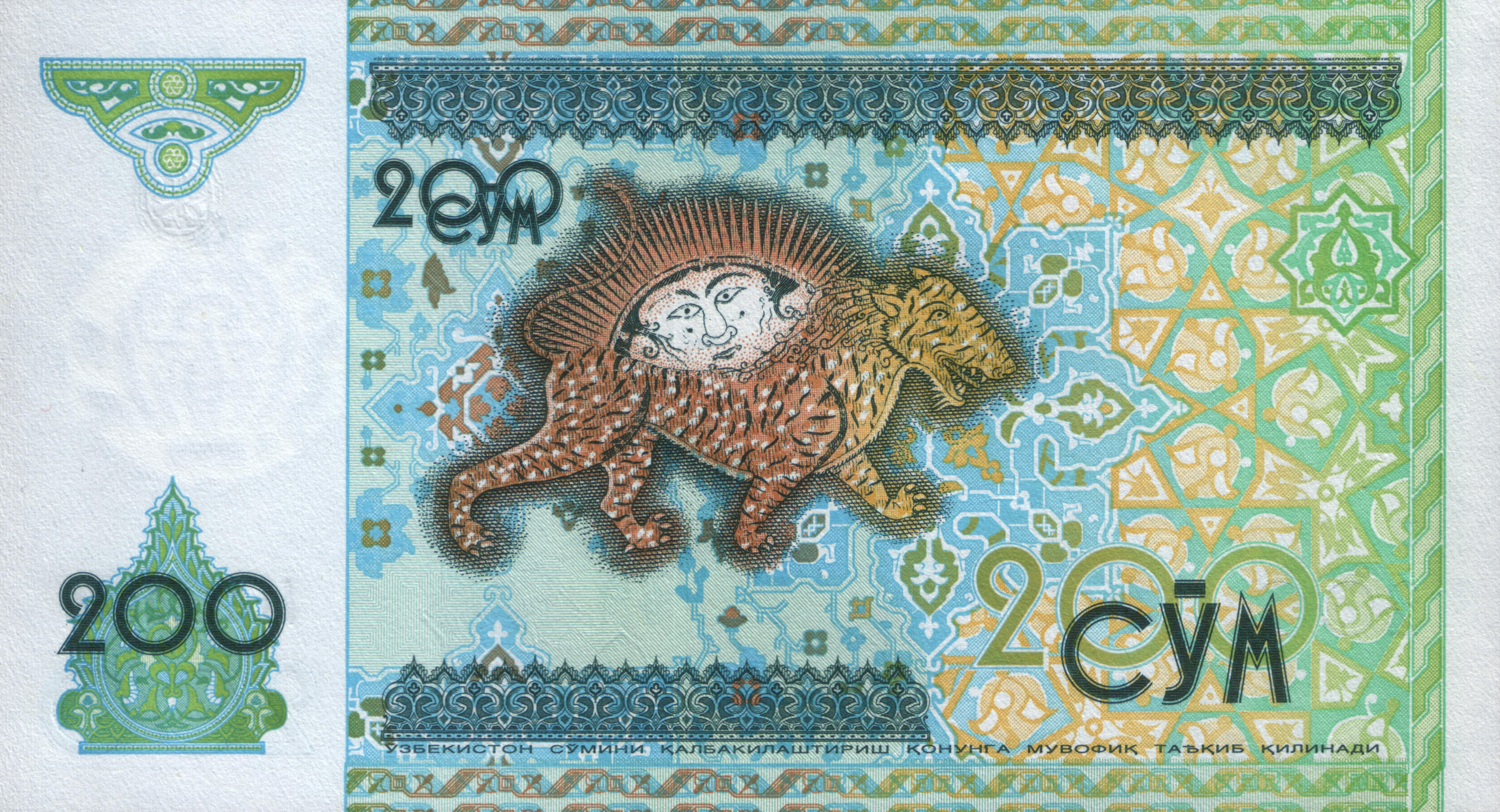
Uzbekistani banknote (reverse) with the Lion and Sun emblem from the painting on Sherdar Madrasa in Samarkand

=== Historical Iranian variations ===
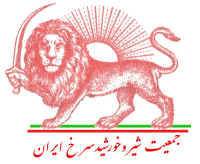
Historic logo of the Red Lion and Sun Society of Iran

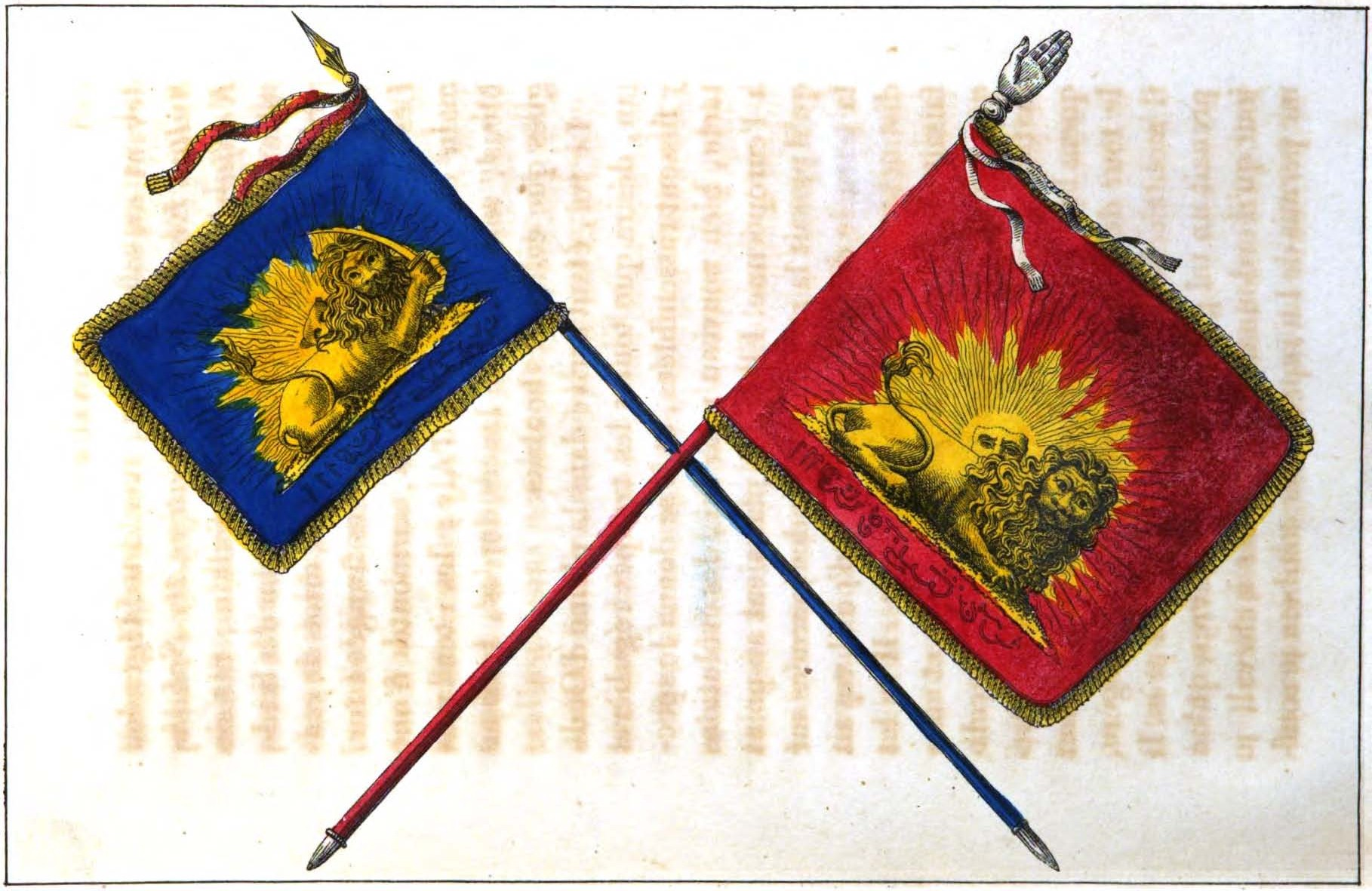
Flag of Iran in the early 19th century depicted by Drouville.

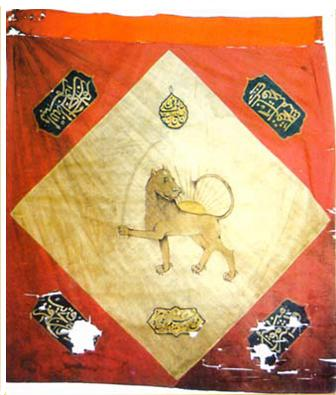
Flag of Eriwan Khanate during the reign of Fath Ali Shah Qajar

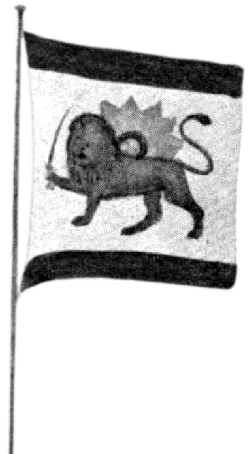
Flag of Iran (1886 AD) reserved for state buildings and royal monuments, forts and ports, and anything related to the state and royalty.

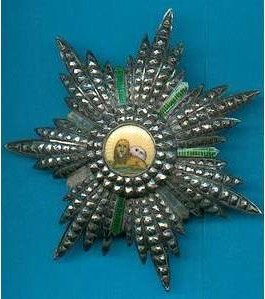
Order of Aftab, 1902 AD

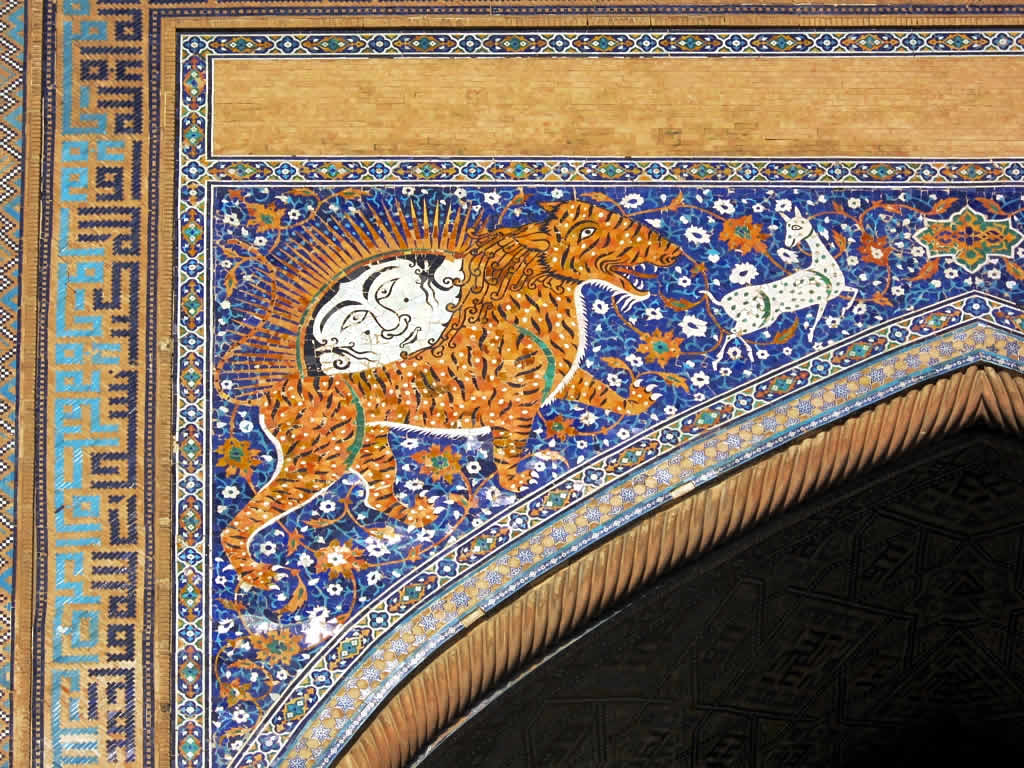
Mosaic representations the Lion and Sun on the façade of the Sherdar Madrasa (1636) at the Registan in Samarkand

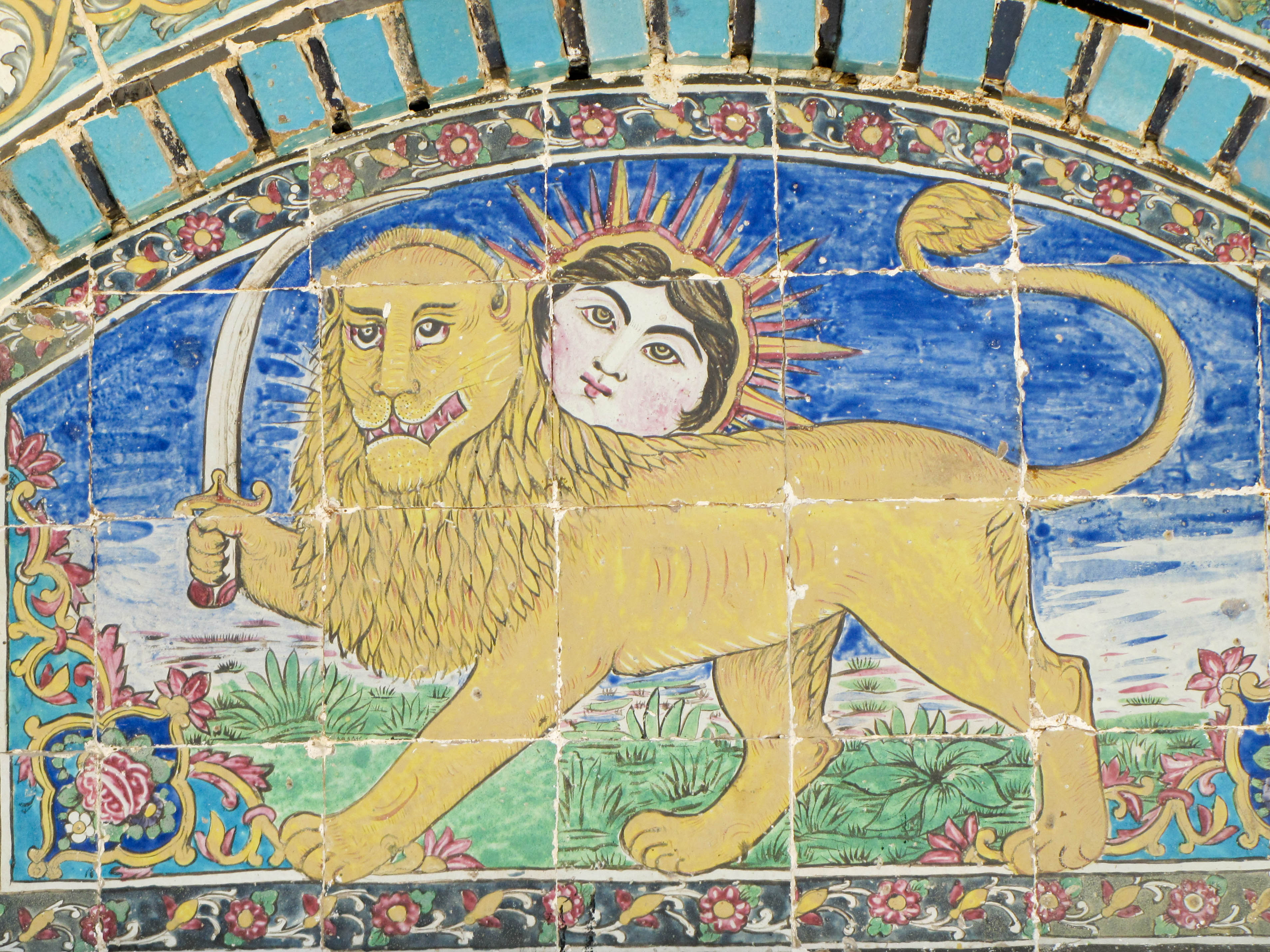
Decorated tiles in Takyeh Moaven-ol-Molk in Kermanshah, Iran

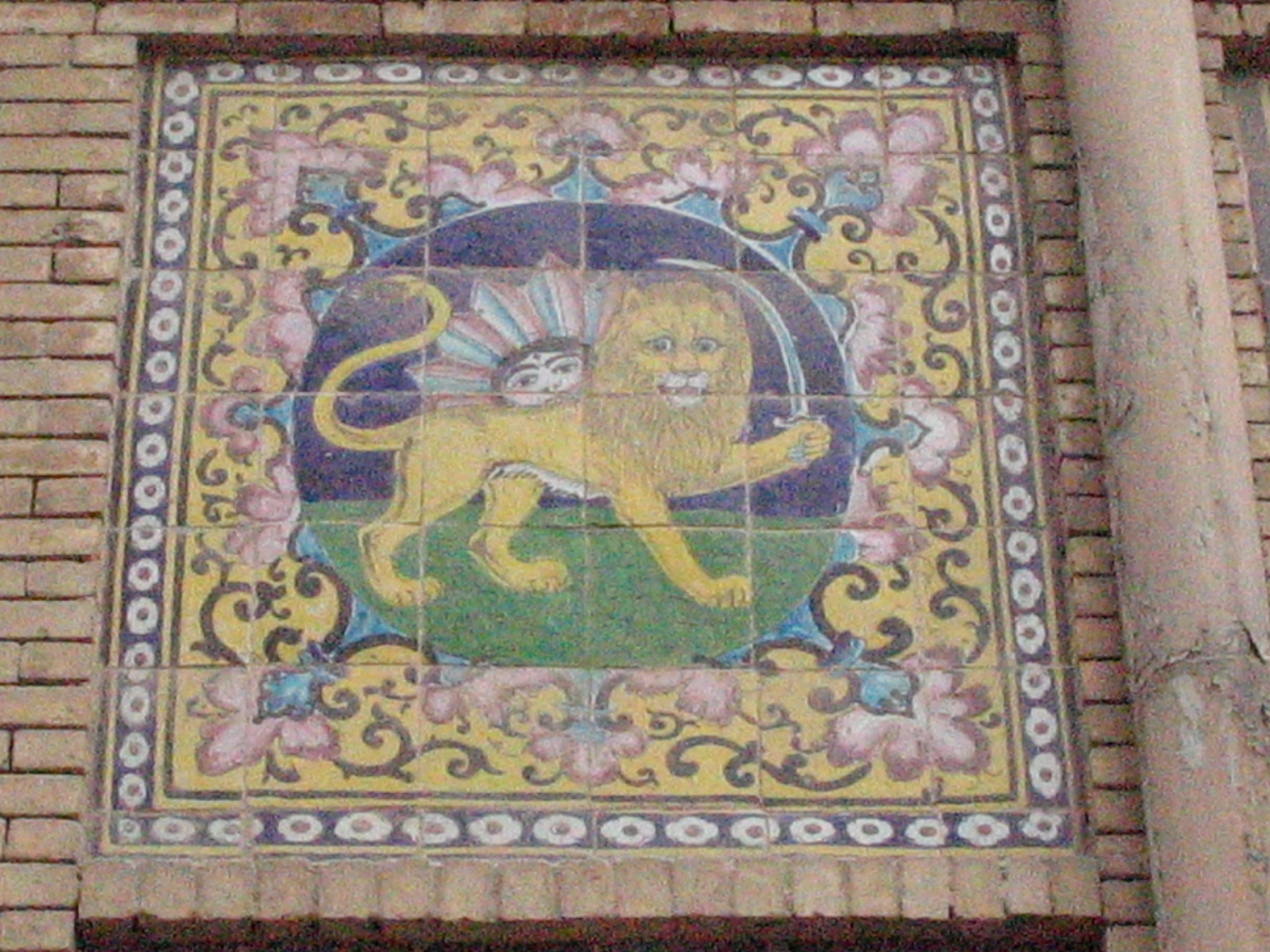
Decorated tiles in Golestan Palace, Tehran, Iran

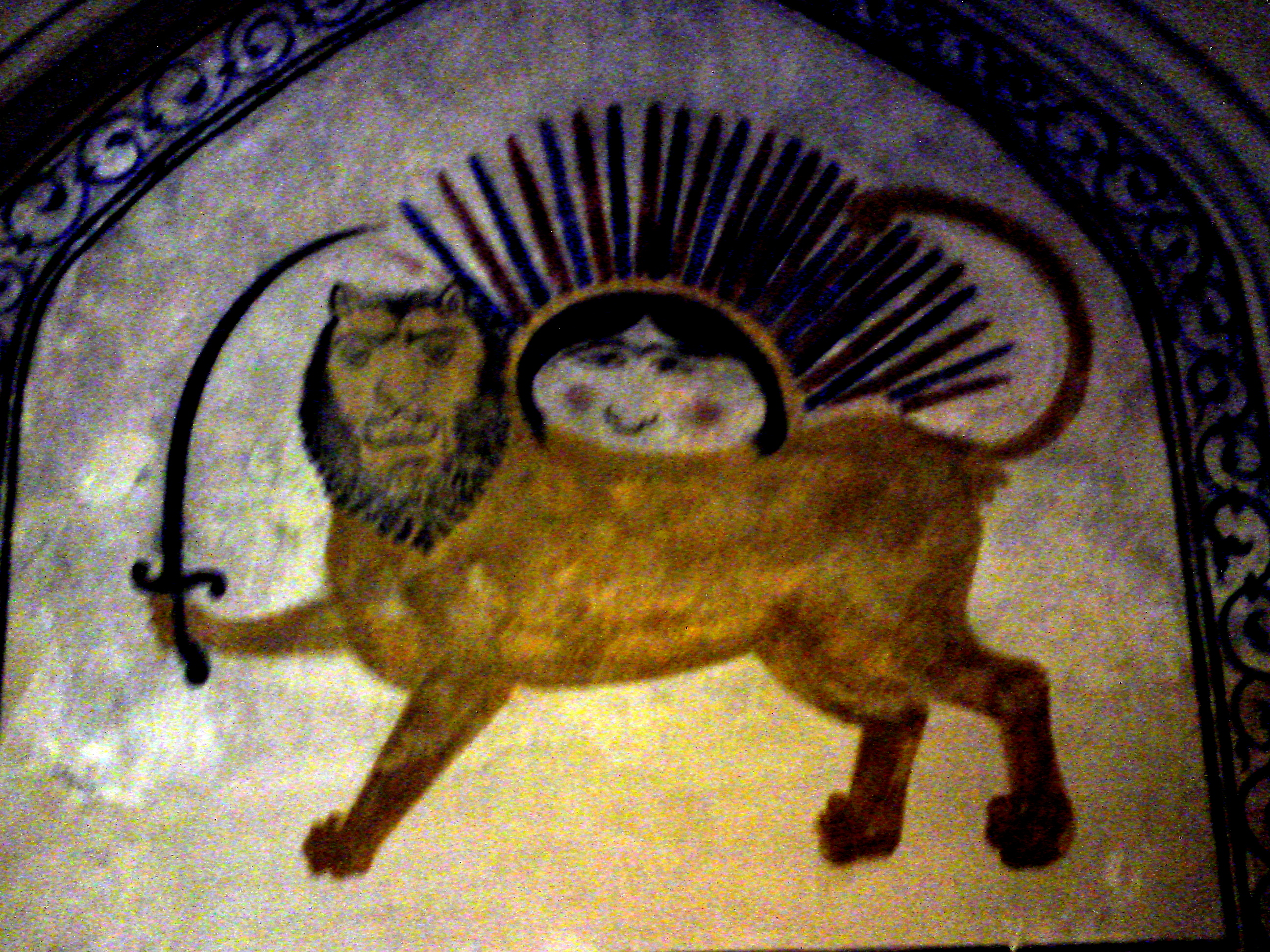
Decorated tiles in a historical Hammam, Isfahan, Iran

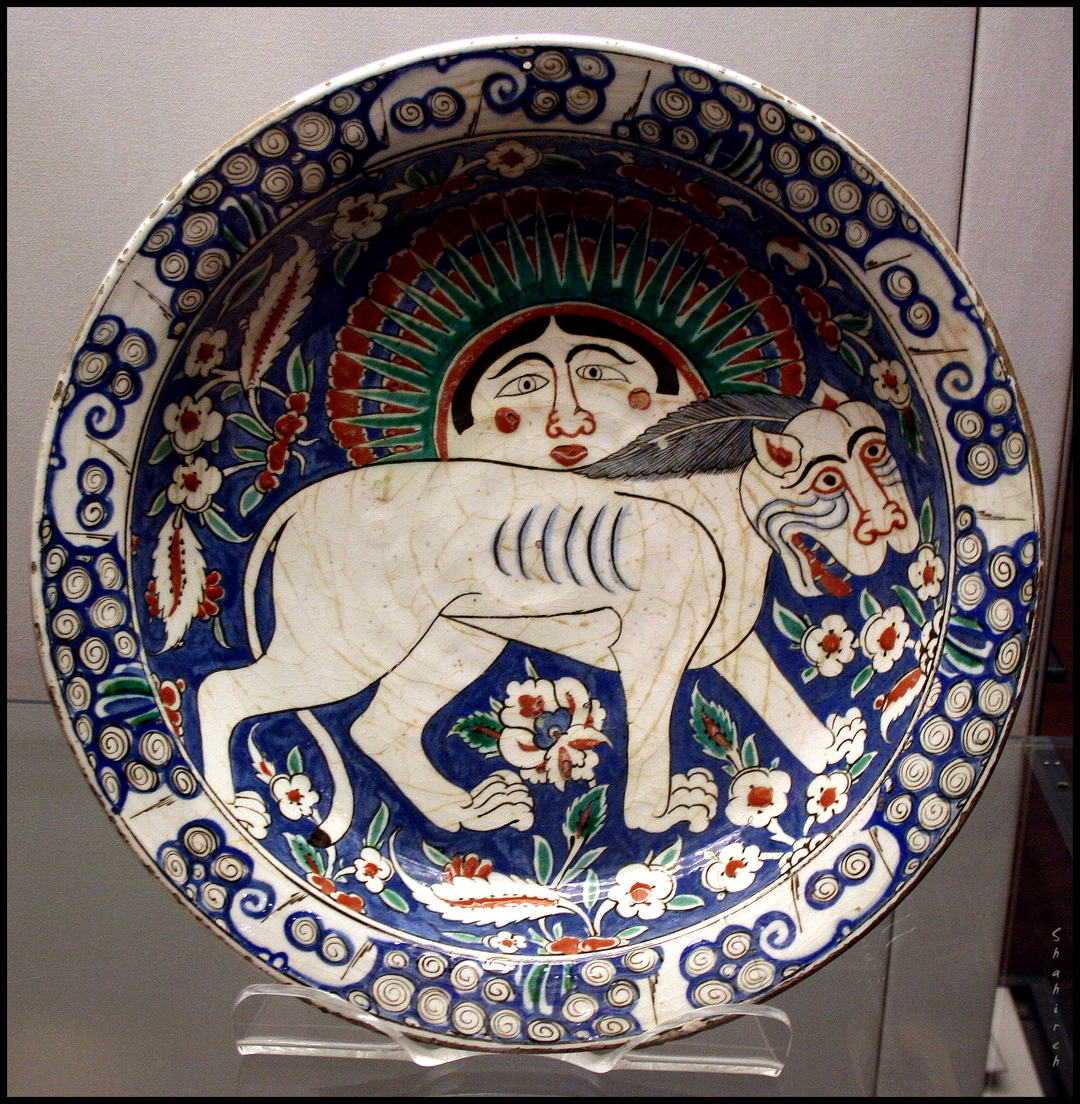
The Lion and Sun Plate in British Museum, London

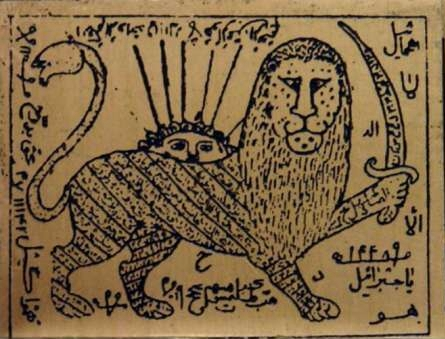
Historical Iranian print

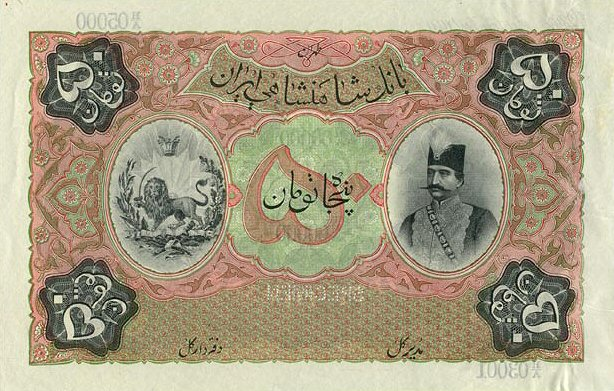
50 Toman banknote from the Qajar Dynasty, mid-19th century

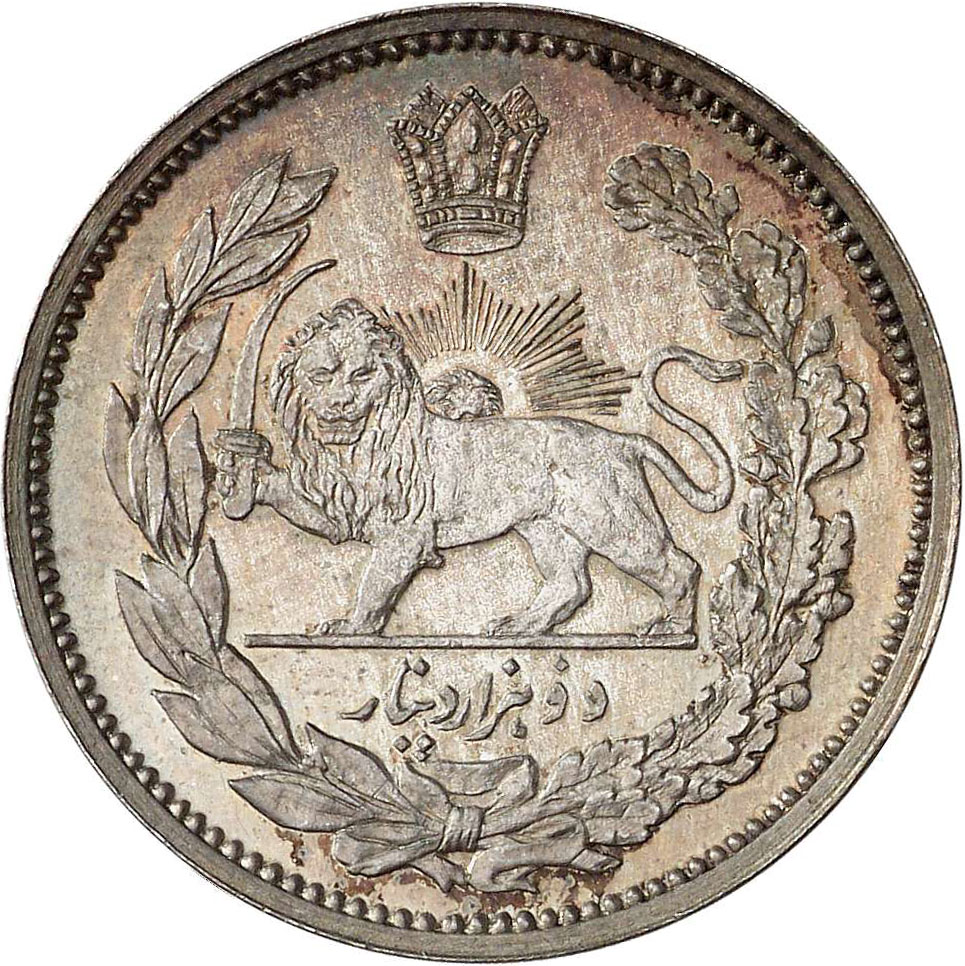
Obverse of a 2000 dinar (2 qiran) coin from the Qajar dynasty, 1907

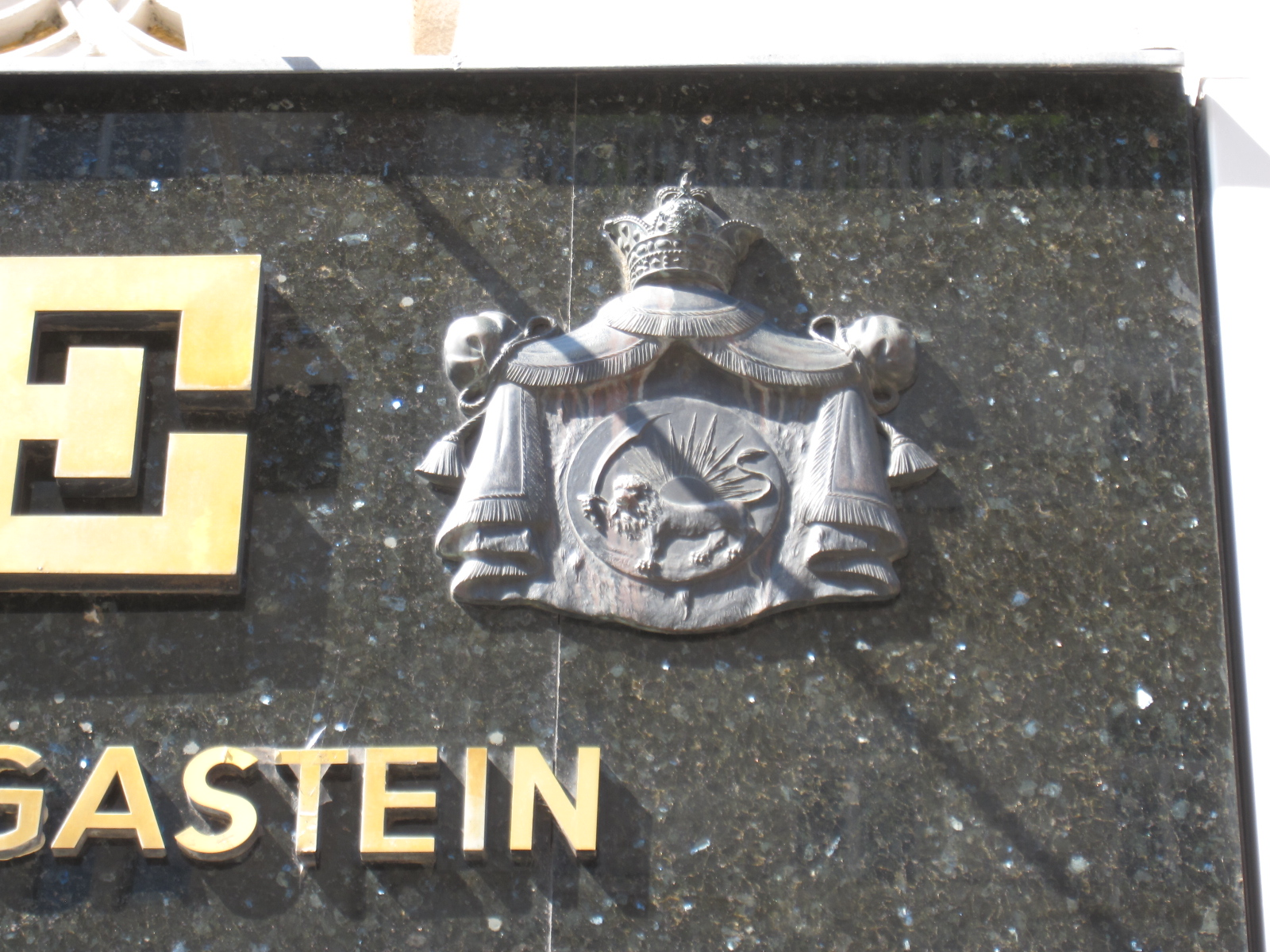
Lion and Sun of the Persian shah at Kniže & Comp. fashion house in Graben, Vienna, Austria

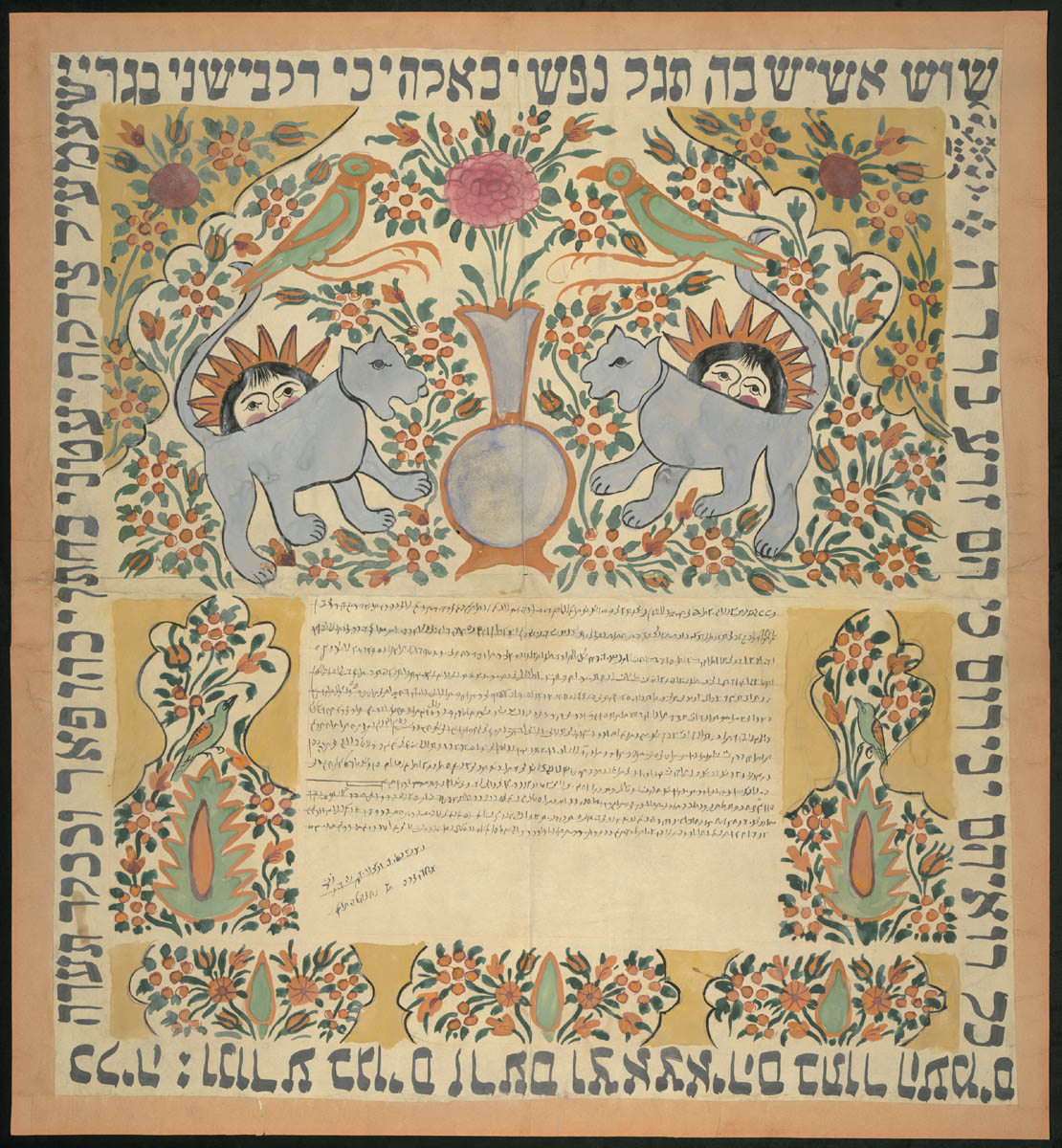
Ketubbah from Persia, 1840s

=== Other (non-Iranian) variants ===
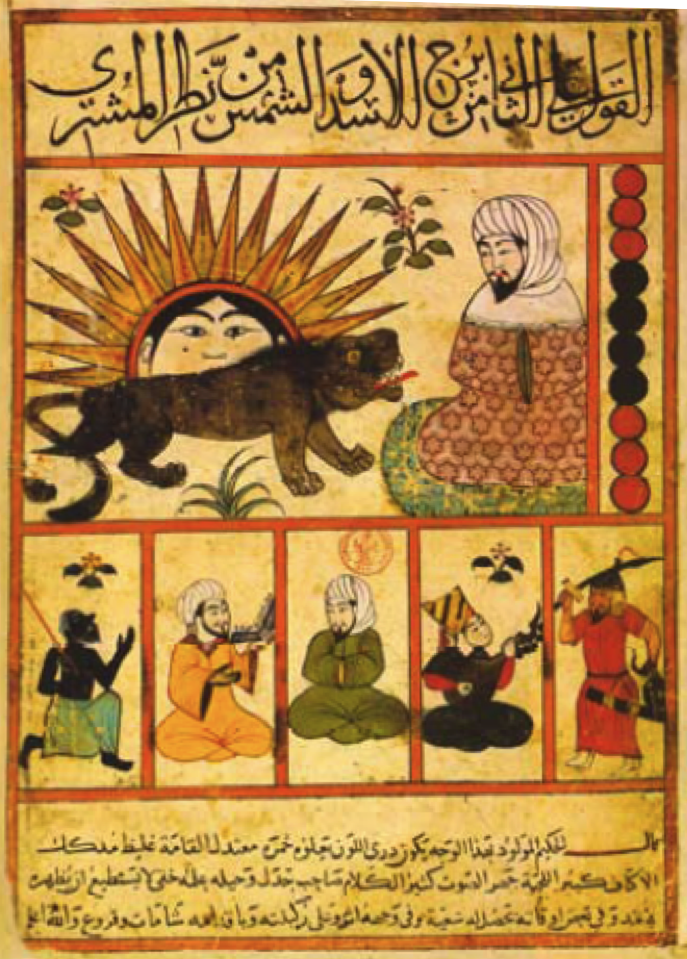
Sample of Abu Ma'shar al-Balkhi's manuscript on astrology, end of 15th century.

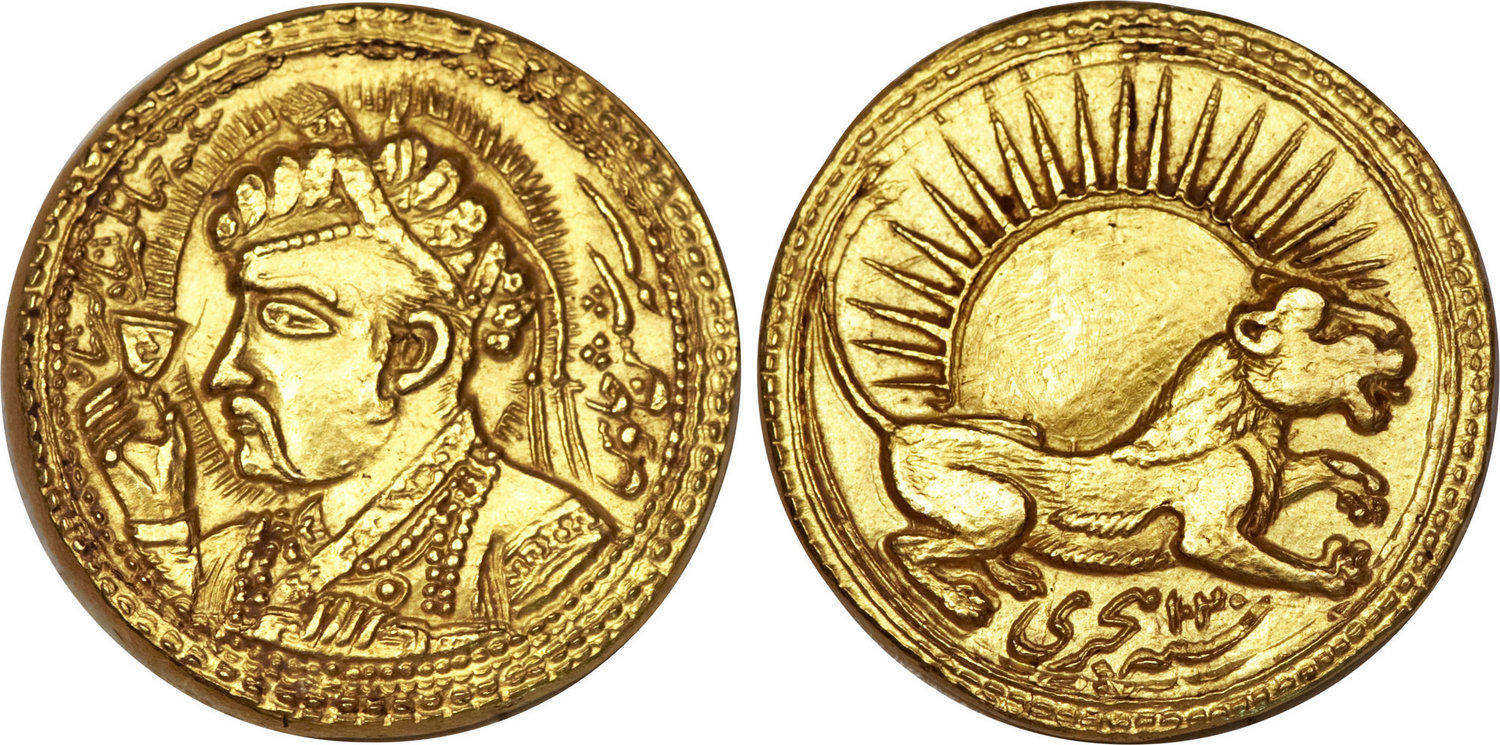
Coin issued by Jahangir Shah of Mughal Empire minted between 1618 and 1625

Seal of Yerevan, Armenia

Coat of arms of Contrexéville, France

Flag of Chesalles-sur-Moudon, Switzerland

Historical flag of Dutugamunu, Anuradhapura period of Sri Lanka

Flag of Sri Lanka

== See also ==
- Lion and Sun flag
- Order of Aftab
- Order of the Lion and the Sun
- Occurrence of the lion in historical Iran
- Persian Relief Committee
