= Konaru =

Konaru or Kenaru (Persian: كنارو), also rendered as Konowru, may refer to:

- Kenaru, Hormozgan
- Konaru, Hormozgan
- Konaru, Kerman
- Konaru, Shahdad, Kerman County, Kerman Province
- Konaru, Jiroft, Kerman Province
