= List of Iranian flags =

The following is a list of flags of Iran.

== National flag ==
Flag	Date	Use	Description
	1980–present	Flag of Iran	A horizontal tricolor of green, white, and red with the national emblem in red centred on the white band and the Takbir written in a Kufic script in white, repeated 11 times along the bottom edge of the green band and 11 times along the top edge of the red band, for a total of 22 times on the fringe of the bands. Dimensions: 4:7
	1980	Flag of Iran with the banned first Takbir design	A horizontal tricolor of green, white, and red with the national emblem in red centred on the white band and the Takbir written in a different (now banned) Kufic script in white, repeated 11 times along the bottom edge of the green band and 11 times along the top edge of the red band, for a total of 22 times on the fringe of the bands. Dimensions: 4:7

== Governmental flags ==
Flag	Date	Use	Description
	1980–present	Flag of the Islamic Consultative Assembly	
	2001–present	Flag of the Ministry of Agriculture Jihad	
	2011–present	Flag of the Ministry of Cooperatives, Labour, and Social Welfare	
	2019–present	Flag of the Ministry of Cultural Heritage, Handicrafts and Tourism	
	1984–present	Flag of the Ministry of Culture and Islamic Guidance	
	1980–present	Flag of the Ministry of Economic Affairs and Finance	A white flag with dark blue borders and a blue emblem of Iran at the top center.
	1980–present	Flag of the Ministry of Education	
	1980–present	Flag of the Ministry of Energy	
	2020–present	Flag of the Ministry of Foreign Affairs	A plain white flag with the logo of the Ministry of Foreign affairs.
	2011–present	Flag of the Ministry of Industry, Mine and Trade	A blue field with the Iranian emblem at the top center
	2017–present	Flag of the Ministry of Information and Communications Technology	
	1983–present	Flag of the Ministry of Intelligence	
	1980–present	Flag of the Ministry of Interior	
	1980–present	Flag of the Ministry of Justice	
	1980–present	Flag of the Ministry of Petroleum	A dark blue field with the national flag of Iran in the canton
	2011–present	Flag of the Ministry of Roads and Urban Development	A white flag with light blue borders with a blue emblem of Iran on the center top
	2000–present	Flag of the Ministry of Science, Research and Technology	A blue field with the logo of the Ministry of Science, Research and Technology
	2010–present	Flag of the Ministry of Sport and Youth	A white flag with dark blue borders with a blue emblem of Iran on the center top

== Military and police flags ==
Flag	Date	Use	Description
	1980–present	Naval jack of Iran	A dark blue field with a yellow Iranian emblem
	1979–present	Official flag of the Islamic Revolutionary Guard Corps.	
	1980–present	Flag of the Islamic Revolutionary Guard Corps Ground Forces	
	1979–present	Ceremonial flag of the Islamic Revolutionary Guard Corps	
	1980–present	Flag of armored units	
	1980–present	Flag of provincial commands	
	1985–present	Flag of the Islamic Revolutionary Guard Corps Aerospace Force	
	1985–present	Flag of the Quds Force	
	1979–present	Flag of the Basij	
	?–present	Flag of the General Staff of Iranian Armed Forces	
	?–present	Ceremonial flag of the Iranian Army	
	?–present	Flag of the Iranian Army	
	?–present	Flag of the Iranian Police (NAJA)	
	?–present	Flag of the Iranian Army Ground Forces (NEZAJA)	
	?–present	Alternative flag of the Iranian Army Ground Forces	
	?–present	Flag of Army Aviation of Iranian Army	
	?–present	Flag of the Iranian Army Air Force (NEHAJA)	
	?–present	Flag of the Iranian Army Navy Force (NEDAJA)	
	?–present	Alternative Flag of the Iranian Army Navy Force	
	?–present	Flag of the Iranian Army Air Defense Force (PEDAJA)	
	?–present	Flag of the Iranian Army Air Defense Force (PEDAJA)	
	?–present	Flag of the Joint Staff the Iranian Army	
	?–present	Flag of Retirees Association of Army	
	?–present	Flag of Secretariat of the General Supervision of the Army Ground Force Command	
	?–present	Flag of Physical Education Organization of Army of Iran	
	1979–1991	Flag of the Islamic Revolutionary Committees	
	1979–1991	Old flag of Shahrbani	

== City flags ==
Flag	Date	Use	Description
	?–present	Flag of Chaharbagh	
	?–present	Flag of Tehran	
	?–present	Flag of Urmia	

== Organization flags ==
Flag	Date	Use	Description
	?–present	Flag of the Fars News Agency	A white field with the Fars News Agency logo charged in the centre
	?–present	Flag of the Foundation of Martyrs and Veterans Affairs	A white field with the Foundation of Martyrs and Veterans Affairs logo charged in the centre
	?–present	Flag of the Mehr News Agency	A white field with the Mehr News Agency logo charged in the centre
	?–present	Flag of the National Iranian Oil Company	A blue field with the National Iranian Oil Company logo charged in the centre

== Historical flags ==
=== Historical state flags ===
Flag	Date	Use	Description
	2400 BC	Shahdad standard	Derafsh Shahdad, one of the oldest flags and the oldest known metal flag in human history.
	559–529 BC	Standard of the Achaemenid Empire	Also called Derafsh Shahbaz, it was the standard of Cyrus the Great, founder of the Achaemenid Empire.
	559–529 BC	Another reconstructed standard of the Achaemenid Empire	
	247 BC–224 AD	Parthian Sun	As noted by Tertullian, the Parthian standard displayed an image of the sun (Apologeticus, 16).
	224–651	Flag of the Sasanian Empire	Called Derafsh Kaviani, it is the mythological and historical flag of Iran until the end of the Sassanid dynasty, which according to Ferdowsi's narration in the Shahnameh, this flag emerged with the uprising of Kaveh the Blacksmith against the tyrannical king Zahak and the beginning of the Fereydon's kingdom and Pishdadian dynasty.
	864–928	Flag of the Alid dynasties of northern Iran	A plain white flag
	1090–1162	First flag of the Nizari Ismaili state	Plain green flag
	1162–1256	Second flag of the Nizari Ismaili state	Plain red flag
	1258–1432	Flag of the Ilkhanate and the Jalayirid Sultanate	A scarlet square on a golden field
	1384–1507	Flag of the Timurid Empire	
	1501–1524	Flag of the Safavid dynasty	A yellow circle represents the sun on a green background.
	1524–1576	Flag of the Safavid dynasty. Used during Shah Tahmasp's reign	A sheep in front of the sun on a green background, symbolizing Tahmasp's birth during the month of Aries.
	1576–1732	Flag of the Safavid dynasty	The Lion and Sun symbol on a green background.
	1747–1796	Standard of the Afsharid dynasty	Three-striped version
	1747–1796	Standard of the Afsharid dynasty	Four-striped version
	1751–1794	A Zand flag	Green-edged Lion and Sun standard
	1751–1794	A Zand flag	Red-and-green-edged Lion and Sun standard
	1789–1797	Flag of the Qajar dynasty	A red background with a lion in a circle in middle of it.
	1798–1848	Flag of Iran in the early 19th century depicted by Drouville.	
	1797–1896	Flag of the Qajar dynasty	A white background with the Lion and Sun on it.
	1848–1852	Flag of the Qajar dynasty	The green and red border was added.
	1896–1907	Flag of the Qajar dynasty	Without red borders.
	1886	Flag of the Qajar dynasty	A horizontal tricolor of green, white, and red with the Iranian lion surrounded in the middle, overlapping the tricolors.
	1907–1933	Flag of the Qajar dynasty and the Pahlavi dynasty	A longer horizontal tricolor of green, white, and red with the Iranian lion surrounded in the middle
	1920–1921	Flag of the Soviet Socialist Republic of Iran	The word Kaveh is written in the canton of the flag referring to the legendary hero Kaveh the Blacksmith from the old Iranian epic poem "Shahnameh" who lead a rebellion against Zahak.
	1933–1964	State flag and ensign of the constitutional monarchy and the absolute monarchy of Iran under the Pahlavi dynasty	Darker shades of green and red
	1964–1980	State flag and ensign of the absolute monarchy of Iran under the Pahlavi dynasty and represented to the wider Iranian diaspora and the Iranian opposition	This flag was standardised during the constitutional monarchy era, but the main flag elements were unchanged and described in the Iranian supplementary fundamental laws of 7 October 1907.
	1980	First flag of the Islamic Republic of Iran	A horizontal tricolor of green, white, and red with the emblem in the middle

=== Other historical flags ===
Flag	Date	Use	Description
	1452–1478	Standard of Uzun Hasan	Uzun Hasan's standard, sultan of Aq Qoyunlu
	1576–1666	Banner of the Safavid Qizilbash	Features the Lion and Sun emblem on white
	1734–1796	Flag of the Afsharid navy	Plain white flag with a red shamshir
	1736–1747	Standard of Nader Shah	Ten stripes – five yellow and five red.
	1751–1779	Flag of Karim Khan	The "Ya Karim" flag, which was a pun on Karim Khan Zand's name, and Al-Karim (the generous), which was one of the Islamic names of God.
	1801–1828	Flag of Eriwan Khanate during the reign of Fath Ali Shah Qajar and Russo-Persian Wars	
	1910–1980	Civil flag and ensign of Iran	A horizontal tricolor of green, white, and red
	1925–1979	War flag and ensign of Iran	War flag and ensign of Iran. (It was first designed in 1910 with the Kiani Crown, which was switched to the Pahlavi Crown in 1925.)
	1979–1979	War flag and ensign of the Islamic Republic of Iran	War flag and ensign of the Islamic Republic of Iran (by removing the Pahlavi Crown and before the withdrawal of the Lion and Sun).

== Political flags ==
Flag	Date	Party	Description
Current
Link to file	1991–present	Assembly of the Forces of Imam's Line	
	2005–present	National Trust Party	
	1989–present	Fada'iyan-e Islam	
	1941–present	Iran Party	
	1941–present	Pan-Iranist Party and Nation Party of Iran	A green field with a white circle and a red symbol
	1941–present	Pan-Iranist Party and Nation Party of Iran	Ditto, but with colors that copies the Nazi Party
Opposition parties active in exile
	2013–present	National Council of Iran	A long horizontal tricolor of green, white, and red with the Iranian lion surrounded by wheat in the middle.
	1979–1985; 2025–present	Azadegan Organization	A white sun in the center emanating 72 golden rays for the 72 words in the four Zoroastrian gathic Manthra.
	2004–present	Kingdom Assembly of Iran	Derafsh Kaviani
	2004–present	Kurdistan Free Life Party	A bicolor of red and green, with an orange sun on the top and "PJAK" on the bottom
	2004–present	Eastern Kurdistan Forces	
Link to file	2004–present	Women's Defense Forces	
Link to file	2004–present	Eastern Kurdistan Units	
	2002–present	Southern Azerbaijan National Awakening Movement	
	1994–present	Constitutionalist Party of Iran	
	1993–present	National Council of Resistance of Iran	A long horizontal tricolor of green, white, and red with the Iranian lion in the middle
	1991–present	Kurdistan Freedom Party	
	1990–present	National Liberation Movement of Ahwaz	
	1984–present	Komala Kurdistan's Organization of the Communist Party of Iran	Plain red flag
	1965–present	People's Mojahedin Organization of Iran	White field with a red MEK logo
	1965–present	People's Mojahedin Organization of Iran	Ditto, yellow variant
	1945–present	Democratic Party of Iranian Kurdistan	
	1887–present	Social Democrat Hunchakian Party	
Former
	1971–1980	Organization of Iranian People's Fedai Guerrillas	
	late 1950s – 1965	Islamic Nations Party	
	1952 – late 1950s	SUMKA	Flag of the National Socialist Workers Party of Iran. Similar to the flag of Nazi Germany
Other
Link to file	2015–present	Islamic Resistance Movement of Azerbaijan	
	2012–2026	Jaish ul-Adl	
	2026–present	People's Fighters Front	
	?–present	Arab separatist flag	Pan-Arab tricolor with a green star in the middle

== See also ==
- Flag of Iran
- Emblem of Iran
- National symbols of Iran
- List of flags used by Iranian peoples
- Imperial Standards of Iran
- Lion and Sun flag
- Derafsh
- O ye avengers of Husayn
