= Shahdad =

City in Kerman province, Iran

Shahdad Persian: شهداد
- City
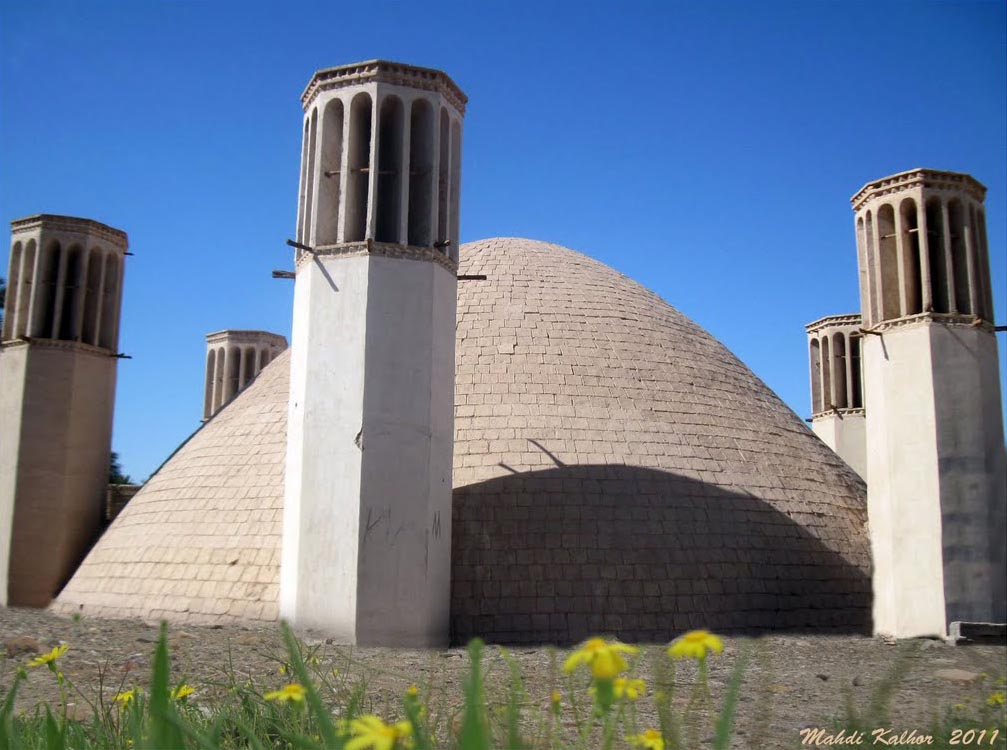
- Haj Mohammad Taghi Ab Anbar

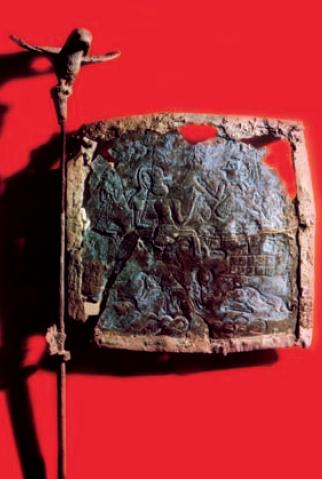
- Flag

- Location within Iran
- Coordinates: 30°25′02″N 57°42′23″E
- Country: Iran
- Province: Kerman
- County: Kerman
- District: Shahdad

Population (2016)
  - Total: 5,217
- Time zone: UTC+3:30 (IRST)

Shahdad (Persian: شهداد) (Note: Also romanized as Shahdād; formerly Khabīs) is a city in, and the capital of, Shahdad District of Kerman County, Kerman province, Iran.

== Demographics ==
=== Population ===
At the time of the 2006 National Census, the city's population was 4,097 in 1,010 households. The following census in 2011 counted 5,942 people in 1,612 households. The 2016 census measured the population of the city as 5,217 people in 1,621 households.

== Geography ==
=== Location ===
Shahdad is the center of Shahdad District, which includes smaller cities and villages such as Sirch, Anduhjerd, Ebrahimabad, and Deh-e Seyf.

The driving distance from the city of Kerman to Shahdad is 95 km. The local climate is hot and dry. The main agricultural produce is dates.

=== Climate ===
Shahdad has a hot desert climate (Köppen climate classification BWh). The city is located at the edge of the Lut desert, which is one of the hottest and driest places in the world. The summers are long and extremely hot, though likely not as hot as lower elevation areas deep in the Lut desert, while the winters are short and mild.

Climate data for Shahdad 482m
| Month | Jan | Feb | Mar | Apr | May | Jun | Jul | Aug | Sep | Oct | Nov | Dec | Year |
|---|---|---|---|---|---|---|---|---|---|---|---|---|---|
| Record high °C (°F) | 29.4 (84.9) | 33.6 (92.5) | 39.0 (102.2) | 42.6 (108.7) | 47.4 (117.3) | 51.8 (125.2) | 53.1 (127.6) | 50.0 (122.0) | 45.4 (113.7) | 41.4 (106.5) | 40.2 (104.4) | 29.0 (84.2) | 53.1 (127.6) |
| Mean daily maximum °C (°F) | 17.2 (63.0) | 22.4 (72.3) | 29.2 (84.6) | 34.5 (94.1) | 40.1 (104.2) | 44.4 (111.9) | 46.1 (115.0) | 44.1 (111.4) | 40.2 (104.4) | 34.7 (94.5) | 25.7 (78.3) | 18.8 (65.8) | 33.1 (91.6) |
| Daily mean °C (°F) | 12.4 (54.3) | 17.1 (62.8) | 23.4 (74.1) | 28.9 (84.0) | 34.5 (94.1) | 38.6 (101.5) | 40.1 (104.2) | 38.1 (100.6) | 33.9 (93.0) | 28.9 (84.0) | 20.6 (69.1) | 14.0 (57.2) | 27.5 (81.6) |
| Mean daily minimum °C (°F) | 7.7 (45.9) | 11.9 (53.4) | 17.6 (63.7) | 23.3 (73.9) | 29.0 (84.2) | 32.7 (90.9) | 34.1 (93.4) | 32.0 (89.6) | 27.6 (81.7) | 23.2 (73.8) | 15.4 (59.7) | 9.3 (48.7) | 22.0 (71.6) |
| Record low °C (°F) | −2.6 (27.3) | −2.0 (28.4) | 3.8 (38.8) | 12.4 (54.3) | 17.0 (62.6) | 26.0 (78.8) | 28.2 (82.8) | 27.0 (80.6) | 20.0 (68.0) | 16.8 (62.2) | 7.4 (45.3) | −0.4 (31.3) | −2.6 (27.3) |
| Average precipitation mm (inches) | 9.3 (0.37) | 8.3 (0.33) | 7.9 (0.31) | 0.5 (0.02) | 0.6 (0.02) | 0.0 (0.0) | 0.0 (0.0) | 0.0 (0.0) | 0.0 (0.0) | 0.0 (0.0) | 0.2 (0.01) | 3.9 (0.15) | 30.7 (1.21) |
| Average precipitation days (≥ 1.0 mm) | 2.4 | 1.9 | 1.4 | 0.1 | 0.3 | 0.0 | 0.0 | 0.0 | 0.0 | 0.0 | 0.1 | 1.0 | 7.2 |
| Average relative humidity (%) | 38 | 29 | 22 | 20 | 15 | 12 | 11 | 12 | 13 | 16 | 25 | 33 | 20 |
| Mean monthly sunshine hours | 204.6 | 203.3 | 241.2 | 250.1 | 297.1 | 329.0 | 348.6 | 343.1 | 313.3 | 297.2 | 248.3 | 221.0 | 3,296.8 |
Source: Iran Meteorological Organization (temperatures), (precipitation), (humidity), (days with precipitation), (sunshine)

== Historical monuments ==
There are many castles and caravanserais at Shahdad and the vicinity. Examples are the Shafee Abaad castle and the Godeez castle.

The shrine of Imamzadeh Zeyd, in the south of the town, is a respected religious site. There is also the main mosque Masjed-e-Rasool (Mosque of the Prophet) where people go to offer namaz.

== Archaeology ==
=== Background ===
Shahdad was a major Bronze Age center discovered in 1968. Around 1970, Ali Hakemi of Archaeological Institute of Iran investigated the site. He conducted excavations for seven seasons.

"By the early third millennium B.C., Shahdad began to grow quickly as international trade with Mesopotamia expanded. Tomb excavations revealed spectacular artifacts amid stone blocks once painted in vibrant colors. These include several extraordinary, nearly life-size clay statues placed with the dead. The city's artisans worked lapis lazuli, silver, lead, turquoise, and other materials imported from as far away as eastern Afghanistan, as well as shells from the distant Persian Gulf and Indian Ocean. Evidence shows that ancient Shahdad had a large metalworking industry by this time."

=== Environment ===
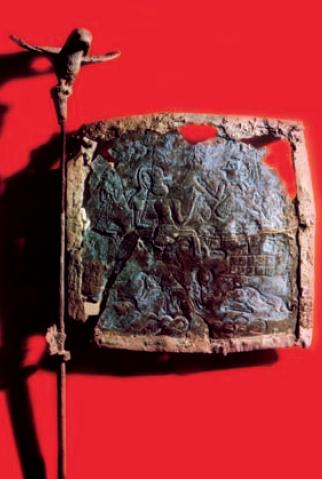
Ancient bronze flag, Derafsh Shahdad, found in Shahdad, c. 2400 BC. This flag is one of the oldest in human history

Shahdad is located in Shahdad Plain of Kerman province. To the east is the Lut Desert, and to the west are the Kerman mountains. Due to proximity of the Shahdad Plain to the Lut Desert, its climate is hot and dry; often there are strong winds blowing densely mixed with dust.

The site of Shahdad was in antiquity located near the Shahdad River and some other streams flowing east.

Shahdad shares many parallels with Shahr-e Sukhteh. Many other ancient settlements are found in what is now empty desert. This is where the Jiroft Civilization flourished. The legendary Aratta of the Sumerian sources may have been located in this area.

Also, according to Iranian archaeologist Hassan Fazeli Nashli, some 900 Bronze Age sites have been documented in the Sistan Basin, which is located further to the east, mostly in Afghanistan.

According to recent research, Shahdad increased in size from the middle of third millennium BC (2500 BC), and was flourishing for more than 500 years. The ancient site is located north of modern town.

The oldest known metal flag in human history was found in this city.

== See also ==
Media related to Shahdad at Wikimedia Commons
