= Keshtuiyeh =

Keshtuiyeh كشتوئيه
- Village
- Location within Iran
- Coordinates: 30°20′40″N 57°30′54″E
- Country: Iran
- Province: Kerman
- County: Kerman
- Bakhsh: Shahdad
- Rural District: Sirch

Population (2006)
  - Total: 113
- Time zone: UTC+3:30 (IRST)
  - Summer (DST): UTC+4:30 (IRDT)

Keshtuiyeh (Persian: كشتوئيه, also Romanized as Keshtū’īyeh; also known as Geshītū’īyeh, Geshtū-īyeh, Gīshītūnīyeh, and Keshītū-īyeh) is a village in Sirch Rural District, Shahdad District, Kerman County, Kerman Province, Iran. At the 2006 census, its population was 113, in 28 families.
