= Hoseynabad-e Ghafuri =

Hoseynabad-e Ghafuri حسين ابادغفوري
- Village
- Location within Iran
- Coordinates: 30°30′42″N 57°46′50″E
- Country: Iran
- Province: Kerman
- County: Kerman
- Bakhsh: Shahdad
- Rural District: Takab

Population (2006)
  - Total: 44
- Time zone: UTC+3:30 (IRST)
  - Summer (DST): UTC+4:30 (IRDT)

Hoseynabad-e Ghafuri (Persian: حسين ابادغفوري, also Romanized as Ḩoseynābād-e Ghafūrī; also known as Ḩoseynābād) is a village in Takab Rural District, Shahdad District, Kerman County, Kerman Province, Iran. At the 2006 census, its population was 44, in 11 families.
