= Pashuiyeh =

Pashuiyeh پشوييه
- Village
- Location within Iran
- Coordinates: 30°02′13″N 58°03′04″E
- Country: Iran
- Province: Kerman
- County: Kerman
- Bakhsh: Shahdad
- Rural District: Anduhjerd

Population (2006)
  - Total: 123
- Time zone: UTC+3:30 (IRST)
  - Summer (DST): UTC+4:30 (IRDT)

Pashuiyeh (Persian: پشوييه, also Romanized as Pashū’īyeh) is a village in Anduhjerd Rural District, Shahdad District, Kerman County, Kerman Province, Iran. At the 2006 census, its population was 123, in 40 families.
