= Konaran =

Konaran or Kenaran or Kanaran (Persian: كناران) may refer to:

- Kanaran (guru), Keralite guru
- Konaran, Hormozgan
- Konaran, Kerman
- Konaran, Sistan and Baluchestan
