= Emblem of Iran =

Emblem of the Islamic Republic of Iran

Emblem of the Islamic Republic نشان ملی جمهوری اسلامی ایران
- Armiger: Islamic Republic
- Alternative names: Persian: نشان رسمی, romanised: Neshân-e Rasmi, lit. 'Formal emblem'
- Adopted: 9 May 1980; 46 years ago
- Shield: word "Allah" Tulip in Persian (لاله)
- Designer: Hamid Nadimi

The emblem of the Islamic Republic of Iran, (Note: Persian: نشان ملی جمهوری اسلامی ایران, romanised: Nishân Milli Jomhuri-ye Eslâmi-ye Irân) also known as Neshan-e Rasmi, (Note: Persian: نشان رسمی, romanised: Nishân Rasmi, lit. 'Formal emblem') consists of four crescents and a sword, surmounted by a shadda. The emblem was designed by Hamid Nadimi, and was officially approved by Ruhollah Khomeini, the first supreme leader, on 9 May 1980.

The four curves, surmounted by the shadda, are a stylised representation of the Arabic word "Allah" (الله). The five parts of the emblem also symbolise the Principles of Shia Islam. The shape of the Arabic text is chosen to resemble a tulip to represent the fallen: it is an ancient belief in Iran, dating back to mythology, that if a young soldier dies patriotically, a red tulip will grow on his grave. In recent years, it has been considered the symbol of martyrdom. It is also inscribed in the centre of the flag of the Islamic Republic.

The logo is encoded in Unicode at code point U+262B ☫ FARSI SYMBOL in the Miscellaneous Symbols range. In Unicode 1.0 this symbol was known as "SYMBOL OF IRAN". However, the current name for the character was adopted as part of Unicode's merger with ISO/IEC 10646.

== History ==
=== Derafsh Kaviani ===
Standard of the Sasanian Empire

The name Derafsh-e Kāviyān means 'Standard of Kāveh'. The latter meaning is an identification with an Iranian legend in which the Derafsh-e Kāviyān was the standard of a mythological Persian blacksmith-turned-hero named Kaveh the Blacksmith, who led a popular uprising against the foreign demon-like ruler Zahhak. Recalling the legend, the 10th-century epic Shahnameh recasts Zahhak as an evil and tyrannical ruler, against whom Kaveh called the people to arms, using his leather blacksmith apron as a standard, with a spear as its hoist. In the story, after the war that called for the kingship of Fereydun had been won, the people decorated the apron with jewels and the flag became the symbol of Iranian nationalism and resistance against foreign tyranny.

The symbol of Derafsh Kāviyāni is a lotus flower, whose history goes back to the beliefs of ancient Iran from the Achaemenid period.

=== Faravahar ===
Faravahar

The Faravahar is one of the best-known symbols of Zoroastrianism. This religious-cultural symbol was adopted by the Pahlavi dynasty to represent the Iranian nation, and after the Iranian revolution it has remained in use in contemporary Iranian nationalism.

The winged disc has a long history in the arts and cultures of ancient West Asia and North Africa. Historically, the symbol is influenced by the "winged sun" hieroglyph appearing on Bronze Age royal seals (Luwian SOL SUUS, symbolizing royal power in particular). In Neo-Assyrian times, a human bust is added to the disk, the "feather-robed archer" interpreted as symbolizing Ashur.

It was only during the reign of Darius the Great and thereafter, that the symbol was combined with a human form above the wings, perhaps representing Darius himself.

=== Early modern Iran ===
Emblem of Iran (1423–1979)

Coat of arms of Iran (1907–1925)

The Lion and Sun motif is one of the better known emblems of Imperial Iran, and between 1576 and 1979 was an element in the flag of Iran.

The motif, which combines "ancient Iranian, Arab, Turkish, and Mongol traditions", became a popular symbol in Iran in the 12th century. The lion and sun symbol is based largely on astronomical and astrological configurations; the ancient zodiacal sign of the sun in the house of Leo, which itself is traced backed to Babylonian astrology and Near Eastern traditions.

The motif has many historical meanings. First, it was an astrological and zodiacal symbol. Under the Safavid and first Qajar shahs, it received a specifically Shi'ite interpretation. In the Safavid era the lion and sun stood for two pillars of the society, the state and religion. It became a national emblem during the Qajar era. In the 19th century, European visitors at the Qajar court attributed the lion and sun to remote antiquity, although it later came to have a nationalistic interpretation.

During the reign of Fat'h Ali Shah Qajar and his successors, the motif was substantially changed. These changes were on the form of the lion, the sun. A crown was also placed on the top the symbol to represent the monarchy.

Since the reign of Fat'h Ali Shah, the Islamic component of the ruler de-emphasised. This shifting affects the symbolism of the emblem. Since this time until the 1979 revolution, the meaning of the symbol elements changed many times. The lion could be the metaphor for Ali, heroes of Iran who are ready to protect the country against enemies, and finally its ancient meaning as the symbol of kingship. The Sun received various meanings including the shah, Jamshid, the mythical shah of Iran, and mother-homeland.

The many historical meanings of the emblem have provided the rich ground for competing symbols of Iranian identity. After the Constitutional Revolution of 1906, Parliament designed a new flag and a new coat of arms.

In the 20th century, some politicians and scholars suggested that the emblem be replaced by other symbols such as the Derafsh Kāviyāni. However, the emblem remained the official symbol of Iran until the Iranian Revolution, when the "Lion and Sun" symbol was removed from public spaces and government organisations and replaced by the present-day coat of arms of Iran.

=== Imperial State of Iran ===
Official design of the Lion and Sun emblem between 1972 and 1980.

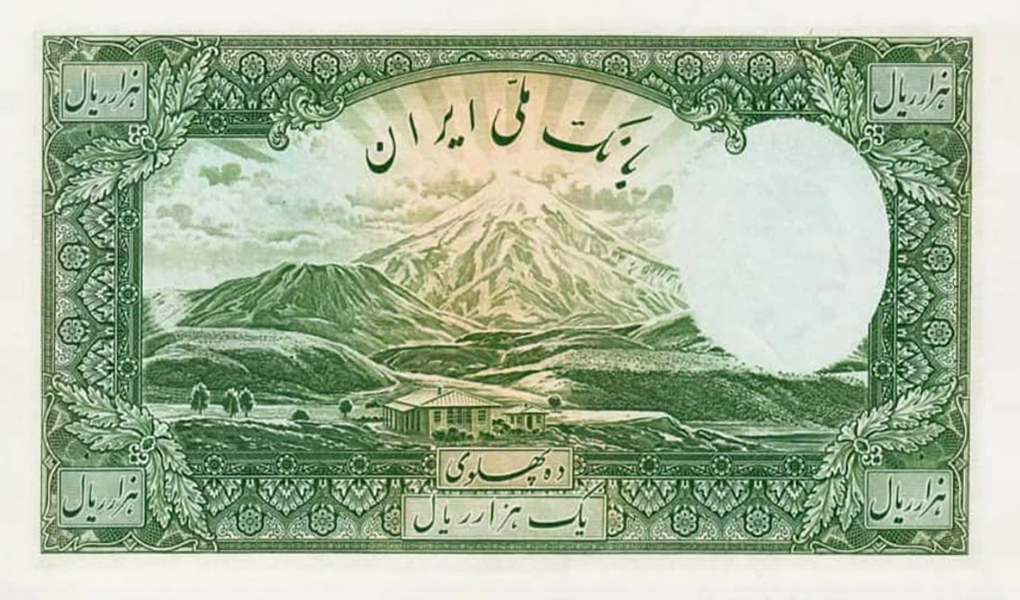
Reverse of a 1925 1,000-Iranian rial banknote depicting Reza Shah's birthplace of Alasht, Mazandaran, with Mount Damavand and a rising sun behind it, basis for the badge of the Pahlavi dynasty which forms the centre of the Imperial Coat of Arms

The Supplementary Fundamental Laws of 7 October 1907 described the flag as a tricolour of green, white, and red, with a lion and sun emblem in the middle. A decree dated 4 September 1910 specified the exact details of the emblem, including the shape of the lion's tail and the position and the size of the lion, the sword, and the sun.

In 1932, seven years after the foundation of the Imperial State of Iran, Reza Shah founded the Order of Pahlavi with the official emblem of the dynasty (Mount Damavand with a rising sun) in a medallion of the Order's badge and star. The coat of arms, an arms of dominion (a state coat of arms that is technically actually the personal arms of the monarch, in this case the Shah), was created with Iran's national and Pahlavi's dynastical symbols: Lion and Sun, Faravahar, Zolfaghar, Simurgh and Pahlavi's arms in the centre. At the top of the coat of arms was the Pahlavi Crown, created for the Coronation of Reza Shah in 1926, and the collar of the Order of Pahlavi was under the shield. The lions with scimitars were the supporters. The imperial motto reads, Marā dād farmud o khod dāvar ast (Persian: مرا داد فرمود و خود داور است, lit. 'He bids me do justice and He Himself is the judge'). In 1971, some details of this imperial achievement were changed in their colours.

Azure and Or are the colours of the House of Pahlavi.

The Imperial Standards of Iran were the personal official flags of the Shāhanshāh, Shahbānu, and the Crown Prince of Iran, adopted at the beginning of 1971. The flags of Shāhanshāh consists of a pale-blue field with the flag of Iran in the upper left corner and the Pahlavi coat of arms in the centre. Emblems were also created for the Shahbānu and the Crown Prince of Iran, and these are at the centre of their respective flags.

The Interim Government also used the lion and sun emblem during the transitional period after the revolution, and before the current emblem was adopted.

Arms of dominion of the Shah and therefore coat of arms of the Imperial State of Iran (1932–1979)

Emblem of the Shahbanou of Iran (1971–1979)

Emblem of the Crown Prince of Iran (1971–1979)

=== Islamic Republic of Iran ===
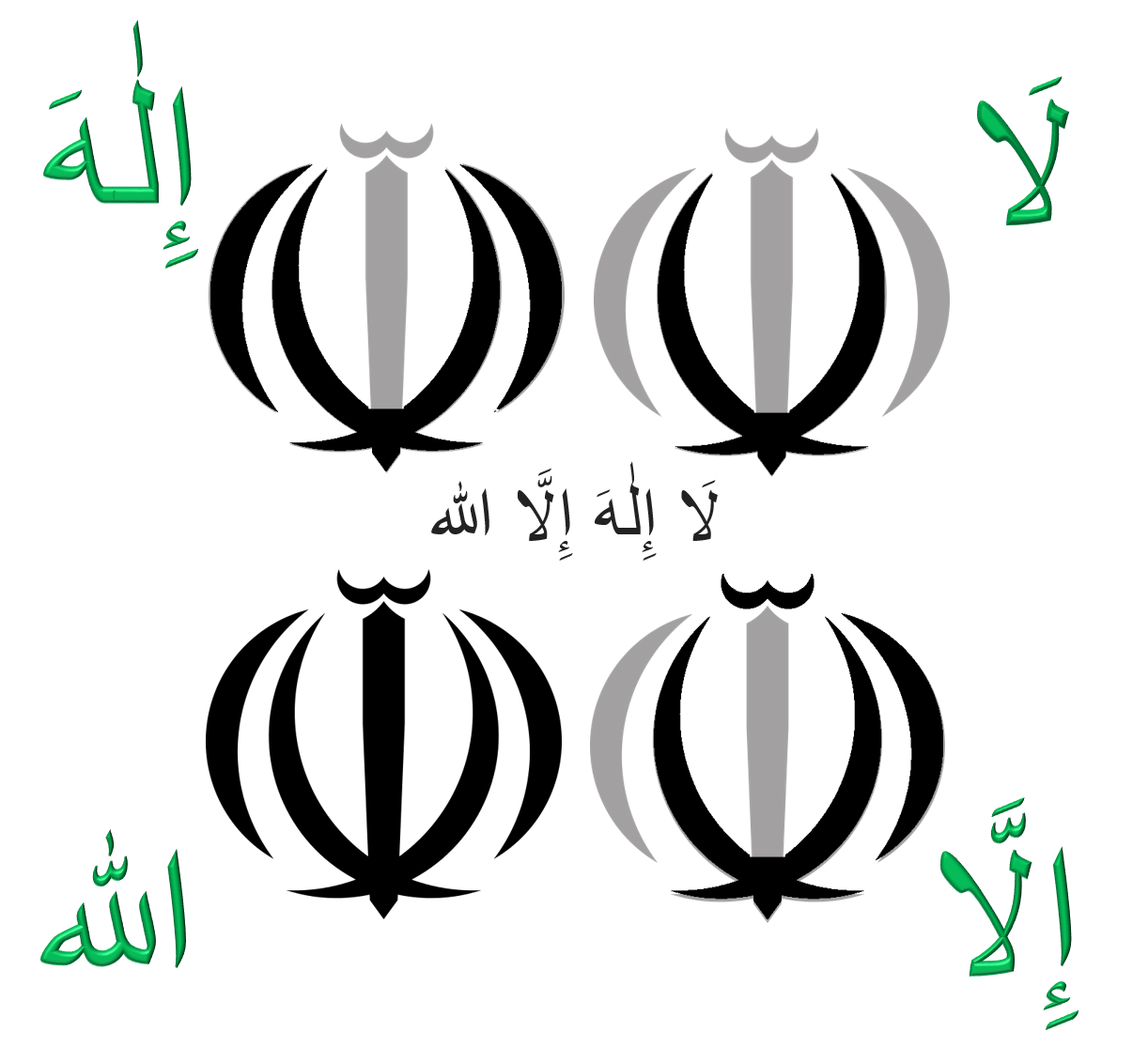
The emblem is based on parts of the Shahada (read right-to-left from top right)

Following the Iranian Revolution, Ayatollah Ruhollah Khomeini called for the dismantling of the lion and sun symbols during a speech on 1 March 1979. Despite the emblem's traditional Shia meanings and the lion's association with Ali, the first imam of the Shia, the first emblem of the Islamic Republic, which consisted of several stars and fists, designed by Sadegh Tabrizi, was adopted on 30 January 1980. Finally on 9 May 1980, the current emblem was adopted.

First version used from 30 January 1980 to 9 May 1980.

Golden variant.

Current emblem (1980 to present).

Red variant.

== See also ==
- Flag of Iran
- National anthem of Iran
- Lion and Sun
- List of flags used by Iranian peoples
- Imperial Standards of Iran
