= Hanza, Kerman =

Hanza هنزا
- Village
- Location within Iran
- Coordinates: 30°14′46″N 57°48′22″E
- Country: Iran
- Province: Kerman
- County: Kerman
- Bakhsh: Shahdad
- Rural District: Anduhjerd

Population (2006)
  - Total: 68
- Time zone: UTC+3:30 (IRST)

Hanza (Persian: هنزا, also Romanized as Hanzā; also known as Hamza) is a village in Anduhjerd Rural District, Shahdad District, Kerman County, Kerman Province, Iran. At the 2006 census, its population was 68, in 17 families.
