= Kod Rud-e Yek =

Kod Rud-e Yek كدرود1
- Village
- Location within Iran
- Coordinates: 30°12′31″N 57°47′19″E
- Country: Iran
- Province: Kerman
- County: Kerman
- Bakhsh: Shahdad
- Rural District: Anduhjerd

Population (2006)
  - Total: 84
- Time zone: UTC+3:30 (IRST)
  - Summer (DST): UTC+4:30 (IRDT)

Kod Rud-e Yek (Persian: كدرود1, also Romanized as Kod Rūd-e Yek; also known as Kod Rūd, Kodrūt, and Kūh-e Do Rūd) is a village in Anduhjerd Rural District, Shahdad District, Kerman County, Kerman Province, Iran. At the 2006 census, its population was 84, in 15 families.
