= Zavar, Iran =

Zavar (Persian: زوار) may refer to:

- Zavar, Kerman
- Zavar, Jiroft, Kerman Province
- Zavar, Mazandaran
- Zavar, Sistan and Baluchestan
