= Pir Gheyb =

Pir Gheyb (Persian: پيرغيب) may refer to:

- Pir Gheyb, Fars
- Pir Gheyb, Hamadan
- Pir Gheyb, Kerman
