= Zavar, Kerman =

Zavar زوار
- Village
- Location within Iran
- Coordinates: 30°13′00″N 57°46′50″E
- Country: Iran
- Province: Kerman
- County: Kerman
- Bakhsh: Shahdad
- Rural District: Anduhjerd

Population (2006)
  - Total: 95
- Time zone: UTC+3:30 (IRST)
  - Summer (DST): UTC+4:30 (IRDT)

Zavar (Persian: زوار, also Romanized as Zavār) is a village in Anduhjerd Rural District, Shahdad District, Kerman County, Kerman Province, Iran. At the 2006 census its population was 95, in 23 families.
