= Bagh-e Hutk =

Bagh-e Hutk باغ هوتك
- Village
- Location within Iran
- Coordinates: 30°22′25″N 57°32′12″E
- Country: Iran
- Province: Kerman
- County: Kerman
- Bakhsh: Shahdad
- Rural District: Sirch

Population (2006)
  - Total: 155
- Time zone: UTC+3:30 (IRST)
  - Summer (DST): UTC+4:30 (IRDT)

Bagh-e Hutk (Persian: باغ هوتك, also Romanized as 'Bāgh-e Hūtk and Bāgh Hūtk; also known Bāgh Hūtak and Bāghuk) is a village in Sirch Rural District, Shahdad District, Kerman County, Kerman Province, Iran. At the 2006 census, its population was 155, in 42 families.
