= Deh-e Seyf =

Deh-e Seyf ده سيف
- Village
- Location within Iran
- Coordinates: 30°33′13″N 57°46′22″E
- Country: Iran
- Province: Kerman
- County: Kerman
- Bakhsh: Shahdad
- Rural District: Takab

Population (2006)
  - Total: 110
- Time zone: UTC+3:30 (IRST)
  - Summer (DST): UTC+4:30 (IRDT)

Deh-e Seyf (Persian: ده سيف, also romanized as Deh Saif and Deh Seyf; also known as Seyf) is a village in Takab Rural District, Shahdad District, Kerman County, Kerman Province, Iran. At the 2006 census, its population was 110, in 23 families.
