= Pir Gheyb-e Bala =

Pir Gheyb-e Bala پيرغيب بالا
- Village
- Location within Iran
- Coordinates: 30°13′25″N 57°46′30″E
- Country: Iran
- Province: Kerman
- County: Kerman
- Bakhsh: Shahdad
- Rural District: Anduhjerd

Population (2006)
  - Total: 77
- Time zone: UTC+3:30 (IRST)
  - Summer (DST): UTC+4:30 (IRDT)

Pir Gheyb-e Bala (Persian: پيرغيب بالا, also Romanized as Pīr Gheyb-e Bālā; also known as Pīr Gheyb) is a village in Anduhjerd Rural District, Shahdad District, Kerman County, Kerman Province, Iran. At the 2006 census, its population was 77, in 15 families.
