= Javan Lake =

Lake in Iran

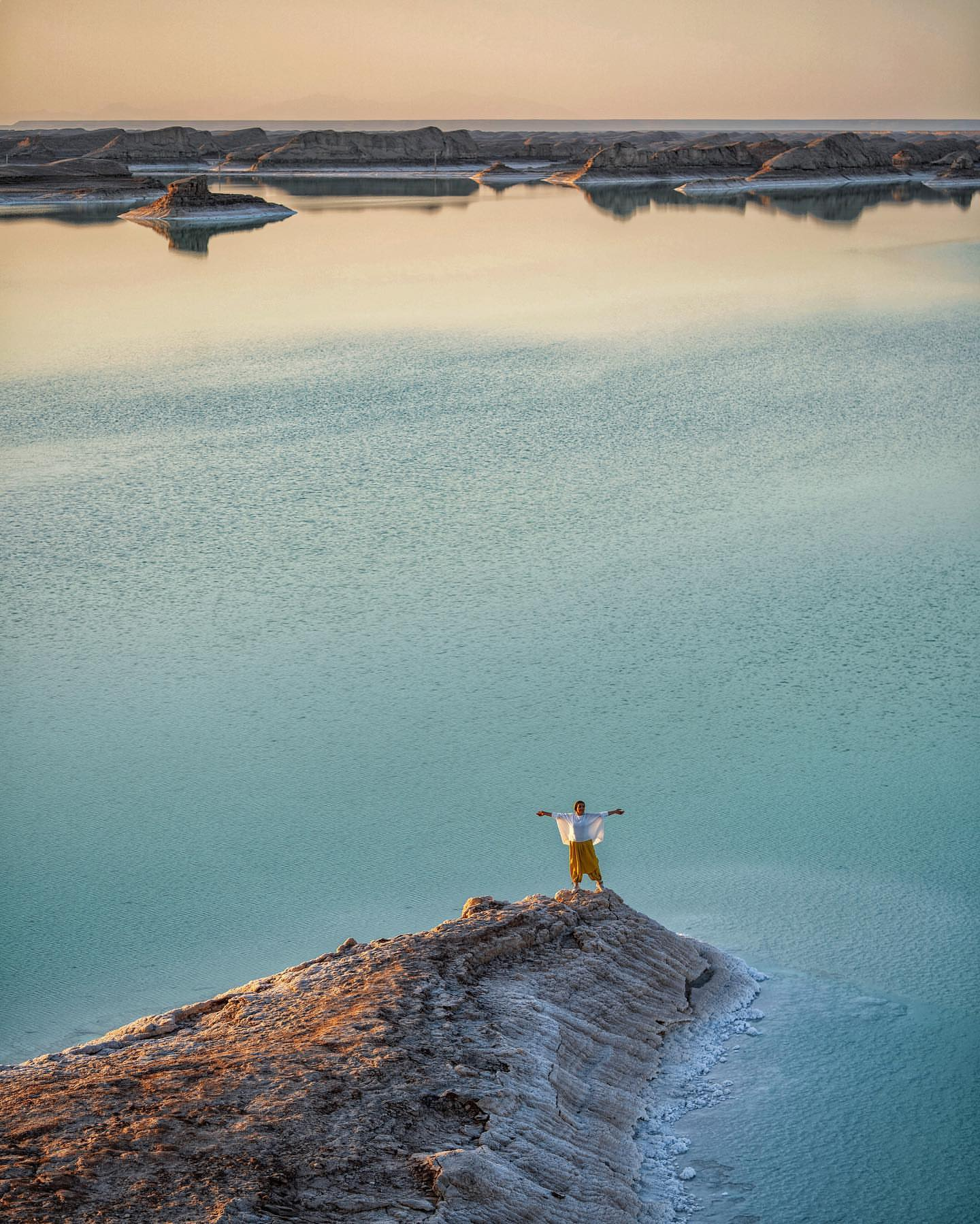
- View of lake in spring

- Location within Iran
- Interactive map of Javan Lake
- Coordinates: 30°39′30″N 57°42′15″E
- Type: Lake
- Primary inflows: rain
- Primary outflows: none
- Surface area: 60 hectares (150 acres)
- Average depth: 5 metres (16 ft) to 6 metres (20 ft)
- Settlements: Shahdad, Kerman, Iran

Javan Lake (Persian: دریاچه جوان, lit. 'Young Lake') is a seasonal and natural lake in Iran. It is located in the desert of Dasht- e Lute within the Shahdad region of Kerman Province. The lake spans an area of roughly 60 hectares. It is also known by several names, including Kalut Javan, Jawan Lake, and Shahdad Lake.

== Background ==
Lake Javan or Shahdad was formed in 2019 by intense seasonal rains. The desert environment has changed as a result of the popularity of the lake. However, because of its creation, water has also made a portion of the Shahdad-Nehbandan road impassable.

A 2019 flood tide damaged the Shahdad- Nehbandan road, but it also led to the unanticipated creation of a lake in the Lut Desert and Shahdad Kalut. This new lake attracted numerous migrant catcalls and converted the area into a stunning natural magnet in Iran. The range of the lake submerged a 40 kilometer stretch of road, leaving behind remnants and electricity poles. The incompletely submerged Kaluts act as islets. Also naming the Young Lake Shahdad is also carried out by Dr. Mostafa Javadipour Moradi, a tourism and media activist in Kerman province.

== Flora and fauna ==
The environment of the lake is domestic to Tamarisk bushes which flourish in wettish conditions. Other foliage incorporates sedge and graminea bushes. The area's distinctive natural life incorporates snakes, shoreline pussycats, dragonflies, sparrows, Chinese pond herons, vagrant birds attracted to the water source, insects, shoreline foxes, reptiles, caracals, sand cats, and skunks, which have made this region their habitat.

== Gallery ==
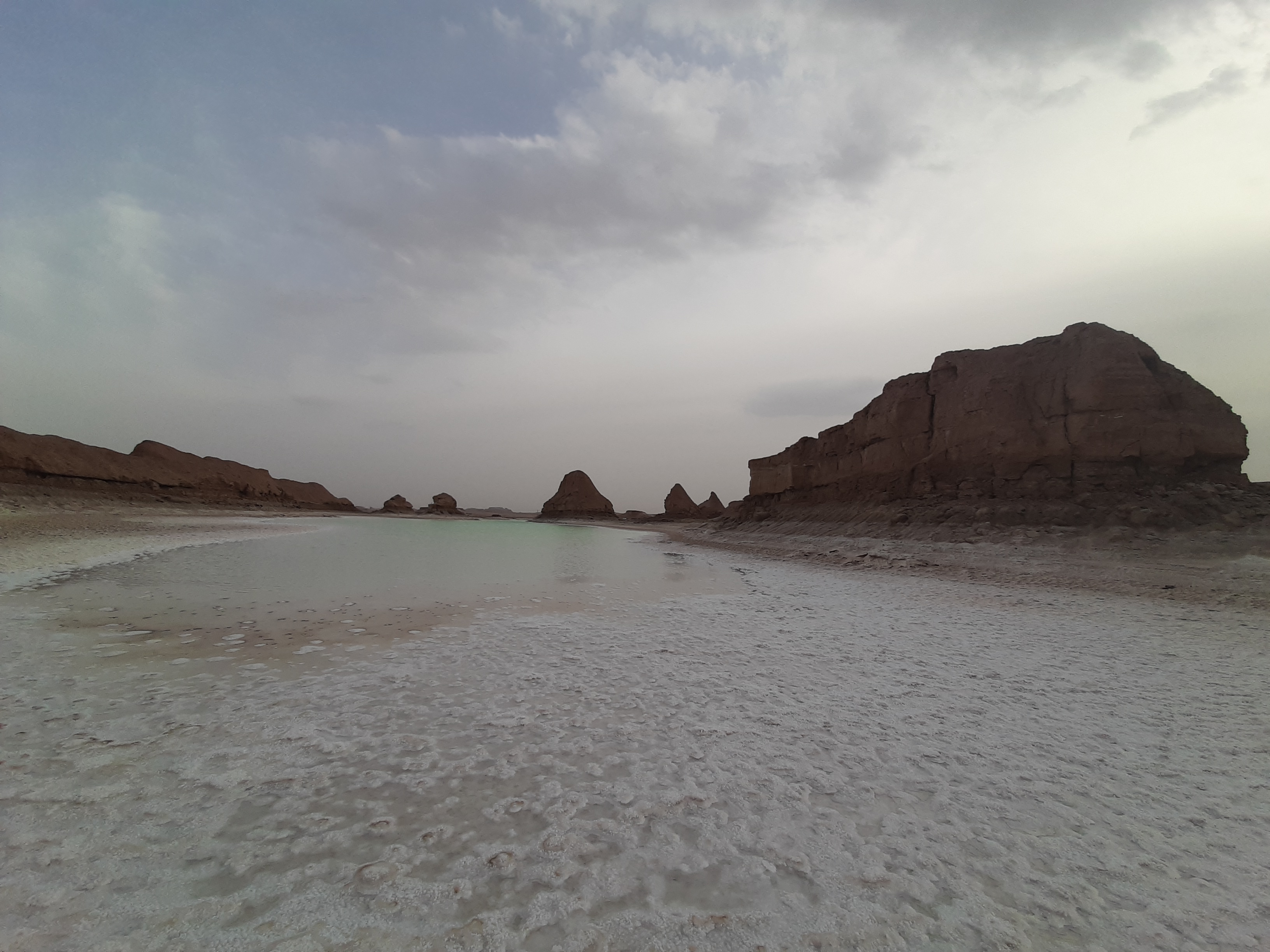

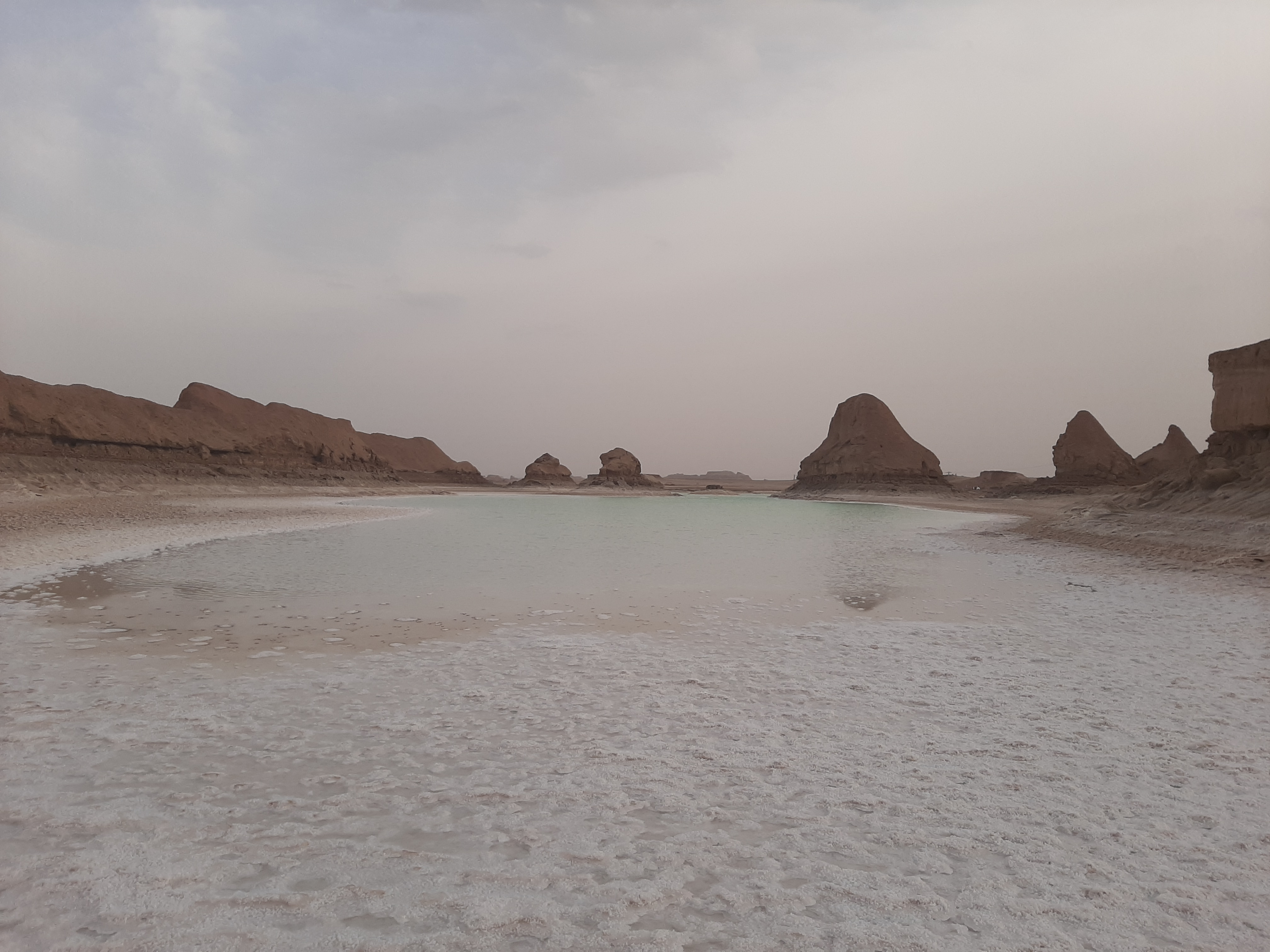

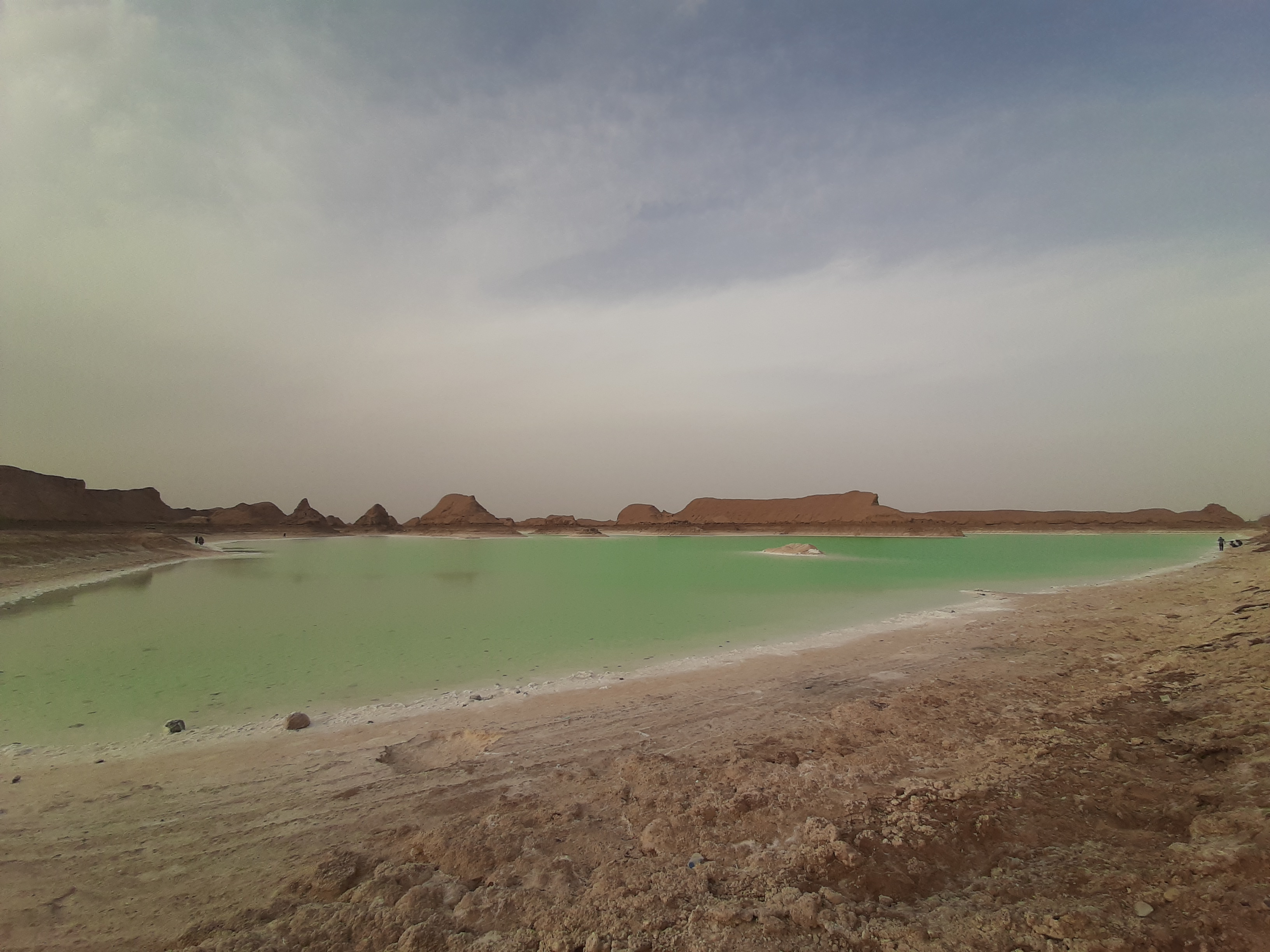

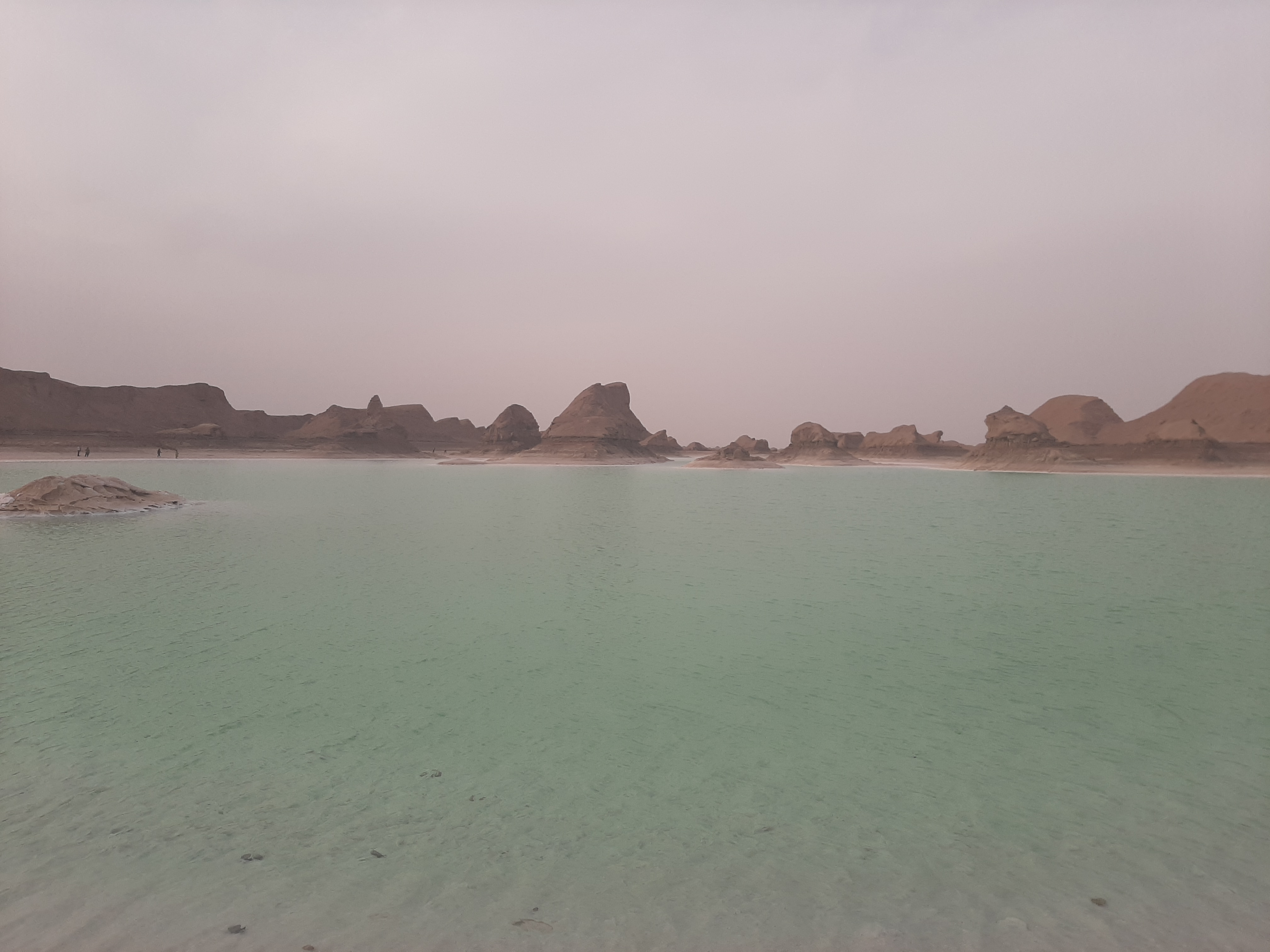

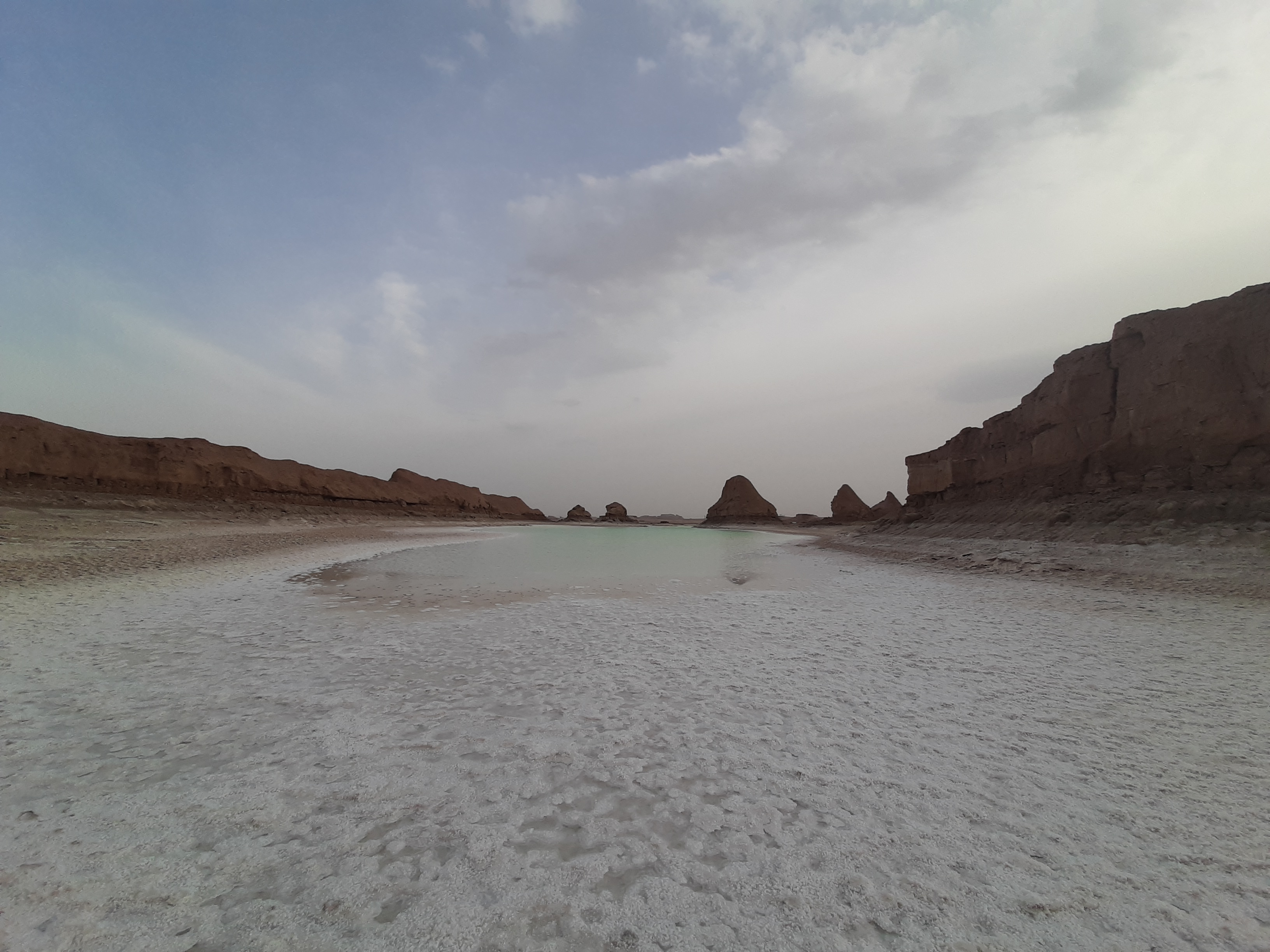
