= Sirch =

Sirch is a German surname. Notable people with the surname include:

== People ==
- Cornelia Sirch (born 1966), East German swimmer
- Luca Sirch (born 1999), German footballer
- Peter Sirch (born 1961), German footballer

== Places ==
- Sirch, Iran, village in Kerman, Iran
- Sirch Rural District, district in Kerman, Iran
- 1981 Sirch earthquake, earthquake in Kerman, Iran
