= The Tales of Majid (miniseries) =

- DVD cover
- قصّه‌های مجید
- Genre: Drama
- Based on: Majid's Tales
- Written by: Kiumars Pourahmad
- Directed by: Kiumars Pourahmad
- Starring: Parvindokht Yazdanian; Mehdi Bagherbeigi
- Country of origin: Iran
- Original language: Persian
- No. of seasons: 1
- No. of episodes: 9

Production
- Producer: Kiumars Pourahmad
- Production locations: Isfahan; Shiraz
- Cinematography: Azim Javanrooh
- Editor: Kiumars Pourahmad

Original release
- Network: IRIB TV1

The Tales of Majid (Persian: قصه‌های مجید) is a 1991 Iranian drama miniseries written, produced and directed by Kiumars Pourahmad based on the book of the same name by Houshang Moradi Kermani. Starring Parvindokht Yazdanian and Mehdi Bagherbeigi.

The main story of Majid's stories was written in Kerman and narrates the moments of a child named Majid who lives with his grandmother (Bibi). Later, this TV series was made from it, which moved the story to Isfahan and in the early 1990s Children and adolescents were broadcast on IRIB TV1.

== Plot ==
The story of the series narrates moments from the life of a teenager named Majid and his grandmother (Bibi). In this series, several stories are shown to the audience, including sea locusts, sports exams, composition bells, camps, and so on.

== Cast ==
- Parvindokht Yazdanian: as Bibi
- Mehdi Bagherbeigi: as Majid
- Jahanbakhsh Soltani: as The role of school superintendent and two other roles
- Morteza Hosseini: as Mr. Heidari (Teacher of Mathematics and Sports)
- Jamshid Sadri: as Headmaster
- Mohammad Ali Miandari: as Strict math teacher
- Bijan Rafie: as Mr. Rafiei and essay teacher
- Hossein Heshmati: as Tailor
