= Jahr (disambiguation) =

Jahr is a village in Iran.

Jahr or jähr may also refer to:

== People with the surname ==
- Adolf Jahr (1893–1964), Swedish film actor
- Arno Jahr (1890–1943), German general during World War II
- Ernst Håkon Jahr (born 1948), Norwegian linguist
- Gottlieb Heinrich Georg Jahr (1800–1875), German-French physician and pioneer of classical homeopathy
- Gunnar Jahr (1884–1968), Norwegian businessperson, sports official and politician
- John Jahr (born 1965 in Hamburg), retired German curler
- Line Jahr (born 1984), Norwegian ski jumper
- Peter Jahr (born 1959), German politician and member of the European Parliament from Germany

== Other uses ==
- Das Jahr (The Year), an 1841 a cycle of pieces by Fanny Mendelssohn

== See also ==
- Jahren (disambiguation)
- Jar (disambiguation)
