= Majid's Tales =

1974 collection of short stories by Houshang Moradi Kermani

- Author: Houshang Moradi Kermani
- Original title: قصه‌های مجید
- Language: Persian
- Publication date: 1974
- Publication place: Iran
- Pages: 680

Majid's Tales or The Tales of Majid (Persian: قصه‌های مجید) is a collection of short stories by Iranian author Houshang Moradi Kermani. Many years before it became a book, it was a radio program script (1974). In 1985, the script was adapted into a book and published. The main character, Majid, is an orphan who lives with his grandmother in the city of Kerman, Iran. The book includes 39 chapters detailing the adventures, misadventures, and coming-of-age milestones from the perspective of this Iranian teenager attending the first year of high school. Majid works in a bakery during the summer and sometimes after school in order to supplement the money that his grandmother receives from her deceased husband's retirement funds. There are some similarities between the fictional character, Majid, and Kermani. For example, Majid is an orphan, while in real life, Kermani lost his mother when he was young. Additionally, Majid and Kermani do not have any siblings and lived in poverty while growing up. It was in this state of solitude and loneliness that Kermani began to write.

== Chapters ==
=== Book Lover ===
In this chapter, Majid is introduced to his first novel by chance. While running an errand for his grandmother, BiBi, Majid is given some dry goods wrapped in a paper funnel. When he gets home, BiBi gives the paper funnel to Majid and instructs him to throw it away in the trash. Before he does, Majid notices the paper funnel is really part of a book. He reads the novel, Escape to the Mountains, with enthusiasm. He is devastated when he comes to the end of his section and realizes that the rest of the book is missing. He goes back to the dry goods store to talk to the owner in order to get the rest of the book. However, the owner, Mashasdollah, is disinterested in helping Majid recover the rest of the book. To gain favor with Mashasdollah, Majid begins to tidy up the store. Unfortunately, Majid accidentally blows salt into Mashasdollah's eyes. While Mashasdollah's eyes are burning, Majid tries to remedy the situation by fetching a bowl of water to wash them out. Unable to see, Mashasdollah knocks the bowl of water over, soaking a sack full of sugar cubes. At the end of the chapter, Majid does not recover the end of the novel, despite searching for it in every bookstore in town. Instead, he tries to imagine how the story ended and writes down his own versions. He frequents the bookstores regularly and is allowed to rent books for a nominal sum. Thus, Majid is so changed by his encounter with his first novel that he becomes a book lover.

=== Cat ===
BiBi is an animal lover and her household includes a white kitten, named Cutie, and a cage of nightingales. She insists that Majid always treat the animals with kindness, but one day when BiBi was out, Majid decides to mess with the birds. When he hears the front door open, Majid is stunned and accidentally drops the cage, injuring the birds. To cover up his fault, Majid blames Cutie, saying that she wanted to eat the birds. BiBi tells Majid to find Cutie another home, as she puts the cat into Majid's hands. Majid tries to find an acceptable place with owners who love to pet cats at night, who keep much creamy milk in their house, and who eat much meat. Unable to find a deserving place, Majid returns home, confessing to BiBi that it was his fault that the cage fell.

=== Woolen Jacket ===
Majid has a new teacher. During his introduction, the teacher delivers an inspiring speech, saying that he himself lost his father at a young age, but that adversity should not an obstacle preventing students from going to college. Majid is so touched by this speech that he comments that if that story is true, count him as a future college student. He then offers the teacher for his grandmother to make him a woolen jacket. The teacher jokingly accepts; however, Majid takes his words seriously. Comedic elements are enhanced when Majid tries to secretly obtain the teacher's measurements by sneaking up behind him with pieces of yarn in hand. After a few unsuccessful attempts, Majid decides to nab an old sweater from the clothesline in the teacher's yard. BiBi uses this old sweater to get the teacher's measurements. Majid returns the old sweater to the teacher's clothesline a few days later, but not until the teacher catches a cold due to a lack of his winter-wear. At the end of the chapter, Majid presents the sweater to the teacher, but the teacher is angered and refuses to accept the sweater. The teacher decides to have a conference with BiBi. He accepts the sweater, but tells Majid to never do that again.

=== Drum ===
At the beginning of this chapter, Majid explains that he is infatuated with playing the drum or tabl, but has never gotten the chance to. One day, he asks his neighbor if he could play his drum, but the neighbor refuses stating, "drums are not for kids". Majid can't afford to buy his own drum, so he decides to secretly sneak into his neighbor's shed, where the drum is kept, in order to play it softly. While in the shed, he becomes so carried away that he begins to play the drum loud enough for his neighbor's wife to hear the drum. Fortunately for Majid, when she comes to the shed, a chicken runs across her path, making her think that the sound of the drum was the work of the chicken. Unfortunately for Majid, she locks the shed door, trapping Majid in the small room with the drum. Eventually, temptation wins and Majid is playing the drum with the drumstick so loudly that people have gathered in the yard, thinking that an evil demon is in the shed, banging on the drum. With clubs in hand and the word "besmallah" on their lips, a group of tough guys come to investigate what is in the shed, only to run away screaming when Majid yells out, "I am Majid". Eventually, the shed door is unlocked and the people watch Majid exit, anticipating instead to see a demon.

=== Invitation ===
In this chapter, Majid learns the lesson not to judge people based on their appearances. At the beginning of the chapter, Majid and BiBi are getting ready to attend a party. Majid realizes that it will be several hours before BiBi is ready, so he asks for permission to go out, wearing his nice, party clothes. He barrows a bicycle from a friend and heads downtown to see the movie posters in front of the cinema. While downtown, he runs into a friend whose family helped Majid and BiBi a great deal after Majid's parents died. He is so happy to see his friend, that he falls off his bike, dirtying his pants and skinning his hands, abdomen, and leg. He invites his friend to a swank ice cream parlor nearby. The two boys are having a great time eating faloodeh and catching up, when Majid realizes he doesn't have any money in his pocket. He left his spending money in his other pair of pants. Majid examines the shop owner to anticipate what will happen when he tells him he doesn't have any money. Majid describes him as fearful looking with thick arms, a thick neck, tattoos, and a face resembling Shimr (or Shemr), the warrior who killed Husayn ibn-Ali in the Battle of Karbala. Majid anticipates that the shop owner will pummel him over the head when he finds out that Majid ordered desserts, but has no money. Majid's guest notices a sudden change in Majid's demeanor, but Majid dismisses it with the comical line, "Sometimes I get dizzy when I eat faloodeh. Some people have that problem". To make matters worse for Majid, Majid's guest suggests that they also order some ice cream to follow the faloodeh. Even though his friend offers to pay for the ice cream, Majid insists that a guest should never pay. After all, it was Majid who extended the invitation. After the ice cream arrives, Majid begins to cry under the table, trying to pretend that he needs to tie his shoe lace. When Majid's friend looks him in the eye, he asks what happened to his eyes. Majid replies, "Sometimes my eyes burn when I eat ice cream. Some people have that problem." When it comes time for Majid to confront the owner about not having any money, he starts babbling about how the bicycle isn't really his, so please don't take it and how his socks should be worth a good deal of money because it is the first time he has worn them, and that if the owner wants to hit him on the head, please do so out of the view of his guest who is waiting across the street. When the shop owner asks Majid to tell him what this is all about, Majid blurts out that he left his money at home, but he invited a friend to eat dessert. The owner laughs loudly and tells Majid to bring the money he owes when he has a chance. At that point, Majid considers the owner to be the kindest soul on earth. Majid says good-bye to his friend, bikes home to get his money, and returns to the ice cream parlor to pay his bill.

=== The Third Barber ===
Majid convinces BiBi to let him grow his hair out during the summer break. After a few episodes of chasing Majid around the house with shears in hand, BiBi reluctantly agrees. However, on the first day of school, the principal sees Majid and tells him he must get a haircut. After school, Majid goes to the local barber only to be told that the shop is now closed. Before he leaves, Majid hears the barber complain to another man of the low-lifes who have been coming in lately, only able to pay the barber a small amount of money. Majid realizes that the shop wasn't really closing - the barber was refusing to cut Majid's hair. He goes off to a cheaper barber, only to be treated like a third-class customer and have his hair cut so that his head resembles a corn cob. When he returns home, BiBi is mortified by Majid's appearance. They set out for a third barber who treats Majid like a little king, mends his cuts he received from the second barber, and trims his hair with precision. BiBi sings his praises, but is surprised by the huge amount he wants to charge them. BiBi pays what she is able to pay.

=== Samovar ===
BiBi and her friends agree to buy a samovar as a wedding gift for a young woman. Due to their economic situation, they must pool their resources in order to afford to buy a beautiful, copper samovar. On the day the women set out to present it to the new bride, they ask Majid to transport it on his bike. Because the elderly women walk so slow, Majid arrives at the house before the women. He decides to pass the time by visiting his aunt. When he arrives with the samovar, she mistakenly thinks that the samovar is for her. She begins to sing Majid's praises and recounts all the times she helped to raise him and feed him. She even tells him about a dream she had where an angel brings her a gift. Majid is too ashamed to tell her the truth - that the samovar is really for someone else. Thus, he leaves the samovar with his elderly aunt as though he really brought it for her. In order to cover up the fact that the gift had been given to someone else, he peddles home, grabs BiBi's samovar, and arrives at the bride's house after the women have arrived. He later tells BiBi what happened. The women explain to the bride what happened and bring another, new samovar to her later on.

=== Bookish ===
Source:

== Tales of Majid Radio Show ==
In an interview with Tebyan.net, Kermani described how the Tales of Majid became a regular radio show. In March 1974, Kermani was writing for a radio station. His bosses wanted a story that was appropriate to air during the Persian New Year. Kermani said that he had a story about a boy who was an orphan and lived with his grandmother. His bosses said it wasn't suitable, but Kermani persisted and described it as a humor piece. Originally, it wasn't supposed to be a series, but it ended up being close to 130 episodes.

== Tales of Majid Mini-series ==
The book inspired a television mini-series directed by Iranian director Kiumars Purahmad. The series debuted in 1990 and was shown on Friday afternoons. It became popular among children and adults alike. The series based on the book was one of the most-watched mini-series in Iran after the Islamic Revolution. Mehdi Bagherbigi was chosen to play the part of Majid out of more than 500 boys who were screened for the role by Kiumars Purahmad. Parvin Dokht Yazdanian, Purahmad's own mother, was selected to play Bibi, Majid's grandmother, after Purahmad screened 20 other older women for the part. There are some subtle differences between the book and the mini-series including the fact that in the book, Majid is living in Kerman, while the mini-series has Esfahan as Majid's place of residence. Moradi stated that he wanted the production to take place in Kerman because Kermanis consider Tales of Majid to be a product of Kerman.

== See also ==
- The Tales of Majid (miniseries)
