= Estehkam =

Village in Kerman province, Iran

Estehkam Persian: استحكام
- Village
- Location within Iran
- Coordinates: 30°25′31″N 57°50′04″E
- Country: Iran
- Province: Kerman
- County: Kerman
- District: Shahdad
- Rural District: Takab

Population (2016)
  - Total: 556
- Time zone: UTC+3:30 (IRST)

Estehkam (Persian: استحكام) (Note: Also romanized as Esteḩkām; also known as Esteḩkām-e Jonūbī, Estekān, and Estīkān) is a village in, and the capital of, Takab Rural District of Shahdad District, Kerman County, Kerman province, Iran.

== Demographics ==
=== Population ===
At the time of the 2006 National Census, the village's population was 338 in 79 households. The following census in 2011 counted 293 people in 70 households. The 2016 census measured the population of the village as 556 people in 157 households.
