= Derafsh =

Flag-like object that represents an entity

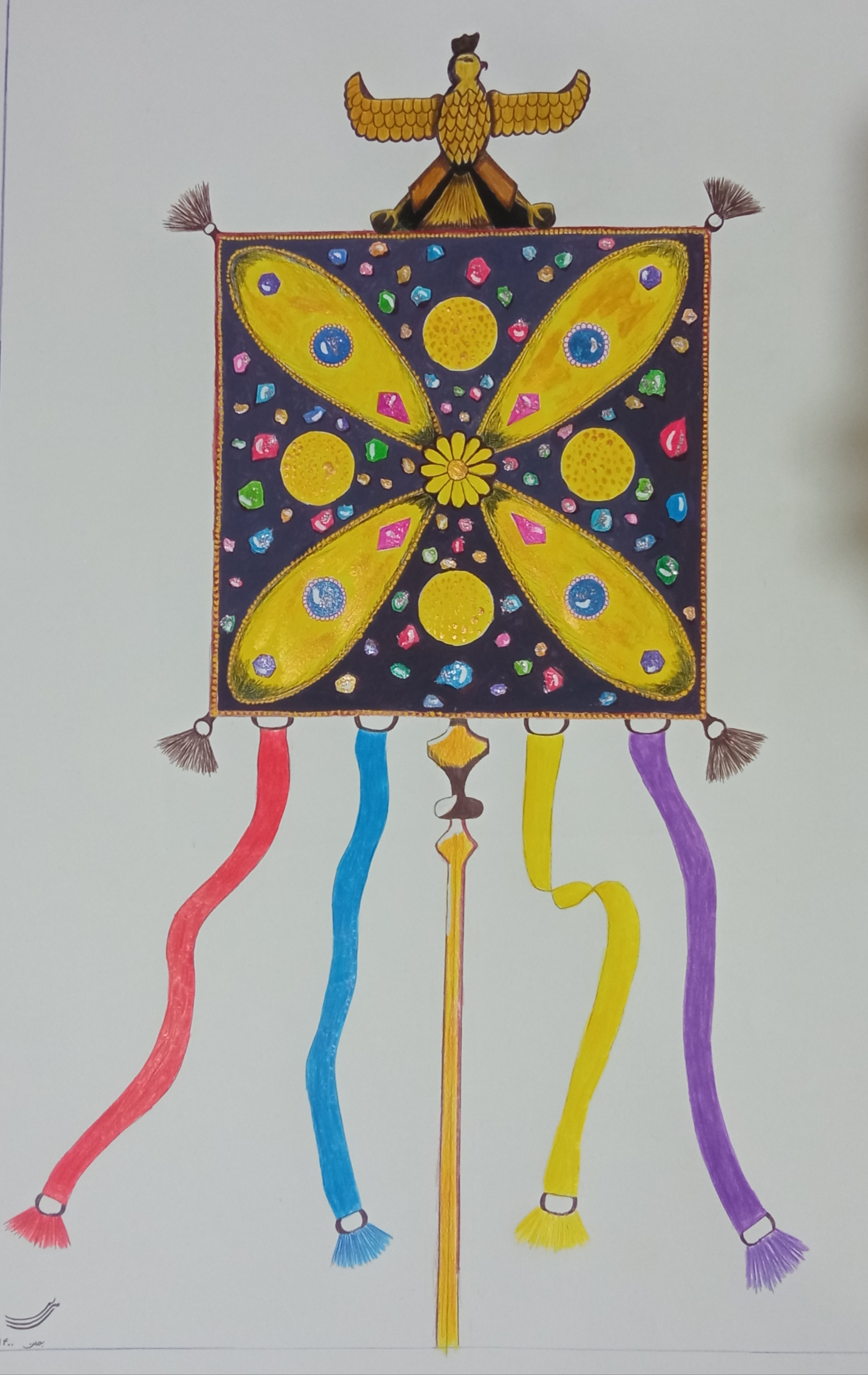
Derafsh

The Derafsh (Persian: درفش) is a particular kind of Iranian battle standard, often associated with its use by ancient Iranian armies.

== History ==
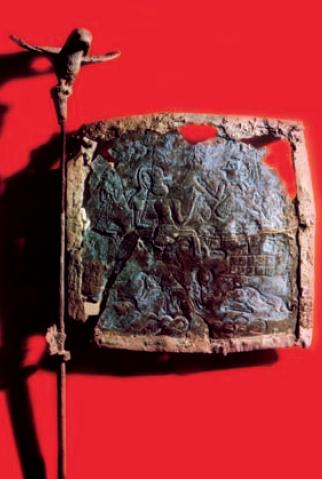
Derafsh Shahdad, c. 2400 BCE. related to the Jiroft culture

A derafsh is a piece of skin or cloth, usually with different patterns and colors, which is used as one of the main symbols to identify relatives and gather together or show the direction of attack. It was originally made of wood, horn, bronze, animal skin and other carved and painted wood or metal ornaments. While there was no flag anywhere, Persians used a bronze flag for the first time which they called Derafsh Shahdad in 2400 BCE. Also, while Derafsh Shahbaz Shahbaz (bird) was used for the standard of Cyrus the Great, these flag-like banners were used for each unit of the Achaemenid army with different style and shapes in 550 BC. The Parthians used a bronze Derafsh Kaviani as a flag, which was tied to a cross bar on the top of the spear under the influence of Kaveh the blacksmith . Its image can be seen on the minted coins of the Parthian kings. Likewise, in the Sasanian Empire, the use of Derafsh Kaviani continued as the royal state flag, which was decorated with gold and precious stones. In modern day, Derafsh Kaviani has an ideological, cultural and intellectual role in modern Iranian nationalism.

== List of Derafsh ==
- Derafsh Shahdad
- Derafsh Shahbaz
- Derafsh Kaviani

== See also ==
- List of Iranian flags#Historical state flags
- Lion and Sun flag
