= Hemmatabad-e Olya, Kerman =

Village in Kerman province, Iran

Hemmatabad-e Olya Persian: همت اباد عليا
- Village
- Location within Iran
- Coordinates: 30°24′16″N 57°48′56″E
- Country: Iran
- Province: Kerman
- County: Kerman
- District: Shahdad
- Rural District: Takab

Population (2016)
  - Total: 606
- Time zone: UTC+3:30 (IRST)

Hemmatabad-e Olya (Persian: همت ابادعليا) (Note: Also romanized as Hemmatābād-e ‘Olyā; also known as Hemmatābād-e Bālā) is a village in Takab Rural District of Shahdad District, Kerman County, Kerman province, Iran.

== Demographics ==
=== Population ===
At the time of the 2006 National Census, the village's population was 317 in 74 households. The following census in 2011 counted 772 people in 196 households. The 2016 census measured the population of the village as 606 people in 169 households. It was the most populous village in its rural district.
