= Ebrahimabad, Shahdad =

Ebrahimabad ابراهيم اباد
- Village
- Location within Iran
- Coordinates: 30°30′15″N 57°47′30″E
- Country: Iran
- Province: Kerman
- County: Kerman
- Bakhsh: Shahdad
- Rural District: Takab

Population (2006)
  - Total: 313
- Time zone: UTC+3:30 (IRST)
  - Summer (DST): UTC+4:30 (IRDT)

Ebrahimabad (Persian: ابراهيم اباد, also Romanized as Ebrāhīmābād; also known as Ibrāhīmābād) is a village in Takab Rural District, Shahdad District, Kerman County, Kerman Province, Iran. At the 2006 census, its population was 313, in 65 families.
