= Baghuk =

Baghuk (Persian: باغوك) may refer to:

- Baghuk, Kerman
- Baghuk, Sistan and Baluchestan
