= Houshang Moradi Kermani =

Iranian children's writer

- هوشنگ مرادی کرمانی
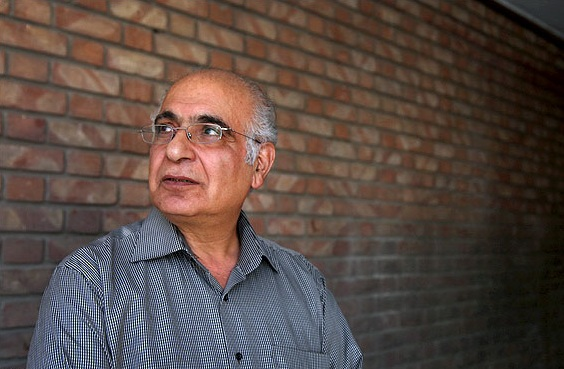
- Born: 7 September 1944 (age 82); Sirch, Iran
- Citizenship: Iranian
- Known for: Novelist, children's literature

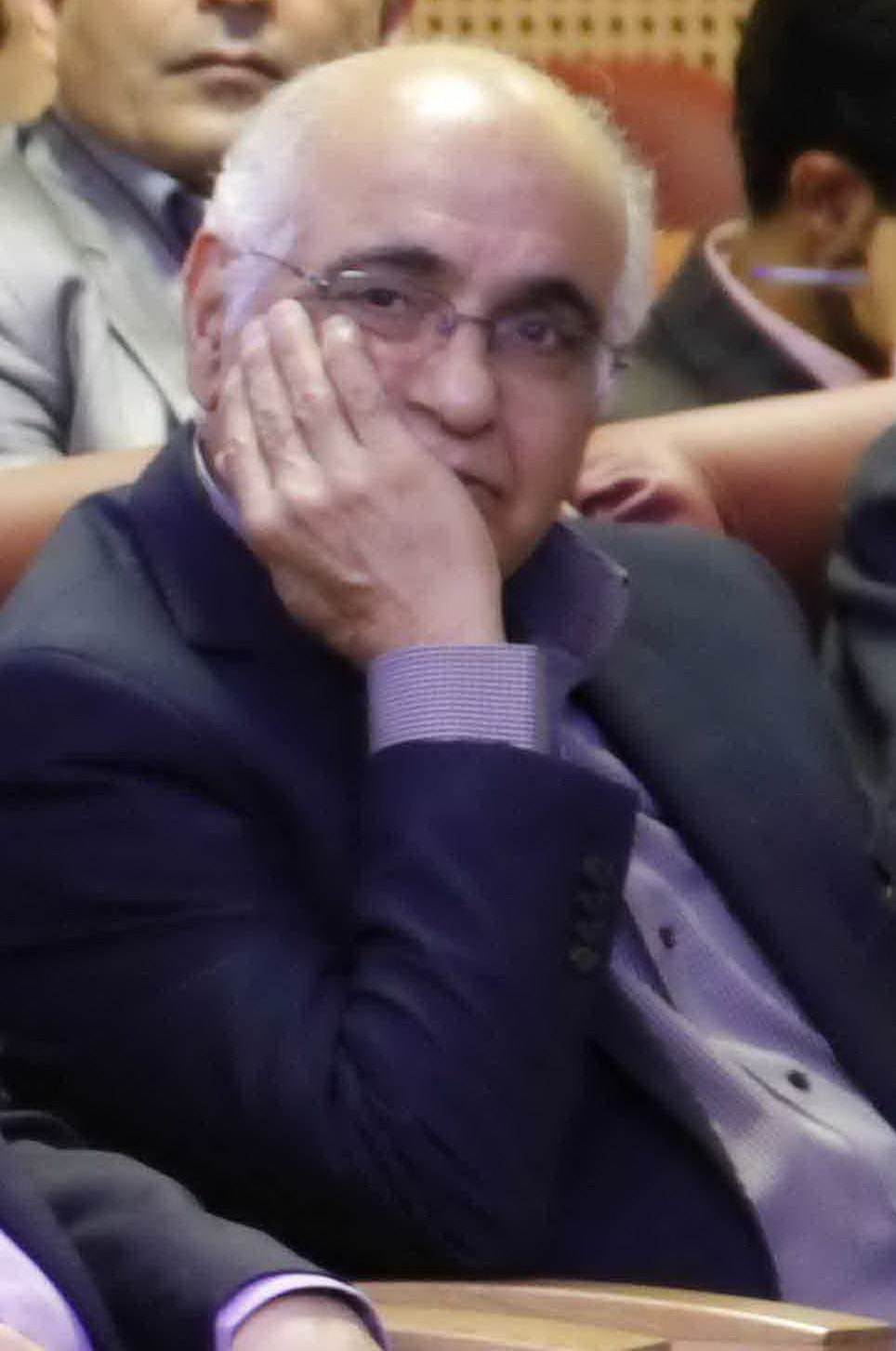
Moradi Kermani at the conference of Kerman in the course of history, Tehran, 30 December 2011

Houshang Moradi Kermani (Persian: هوشنگ مرادی کرمانی, also Romanized as "Hūshang-e Morādi-e Kermāni"; born 7 September 1944 at Sirch, a village in Kerman province, Iran) is an Iranian writer best known for children's and young adult fiction. He was a finalist in 2014 for the Hans Christian Andersen Award.

Moradi Kermani was born in Sirch, a village in Kerman province, and was educated in Sirch, Kerman, and Tehran.

Several Iranian movies and TV series have been made based on his books. In 2006, Dariush Mehrjui directed Mehman-e Maman based on Moradi Kermani's novel with the same title.

Some of Moradi Kermani's books have been translated into English, Esperanto, German, French, Spanish, Dutch, Arabic, and Armenian. His auto-biography was published by Moin Publishers in 2005, entitled "You're No Stranger Here" (Shoma ke gharibe nistid).

He has won the Hans Christian Andersen, Honorary diploma (1992) and University of San Francisco book of the year (2000).

Houshang Moradi Kermani was a 2018 candidate for the Astrid Lindgren award.

== Selected works ==
- Majid's Tales (Ghesseh-ha-ye Majid; قصه‌های مجید) translated by Caroline Croskery
- The Boot (Chakmeh; چکمه)
- The Palm (Nakhl; نخل) translated by Caroline Croskery
- The Tandoor (Tanour; تنور)
- The Water Urn (Khomreh; کوزه) translated by Caroline Croskery
- Mommy's Guest (Mehman-e maaman; مهمان مامان)
- Fist on Hide (Mosht bar poust; مشت بر پوست)
- You're No Stranger Here (Shoma ke gharibe nistid; شما که غریبه نیستید) translated by Caroline Croskery
- A Sweet Jam (Moraba ye Shirin;مربای شیرین) translated by Caroline Croskery
