= Siroch, Iran =

Village in Kerman province, Iran

Siroch Persian: سيرچ
- Village
- Location within Iran
- Coordinates: 30°11′54″N 57°33′37″E
- Country: Iran
- Province: Kerman
- County: Kerman
- District: Shahdad
- Rural District: Siroch

Population (2016)
  - Total: 1,550
- Time zone: UTC+3:30 (IRST)

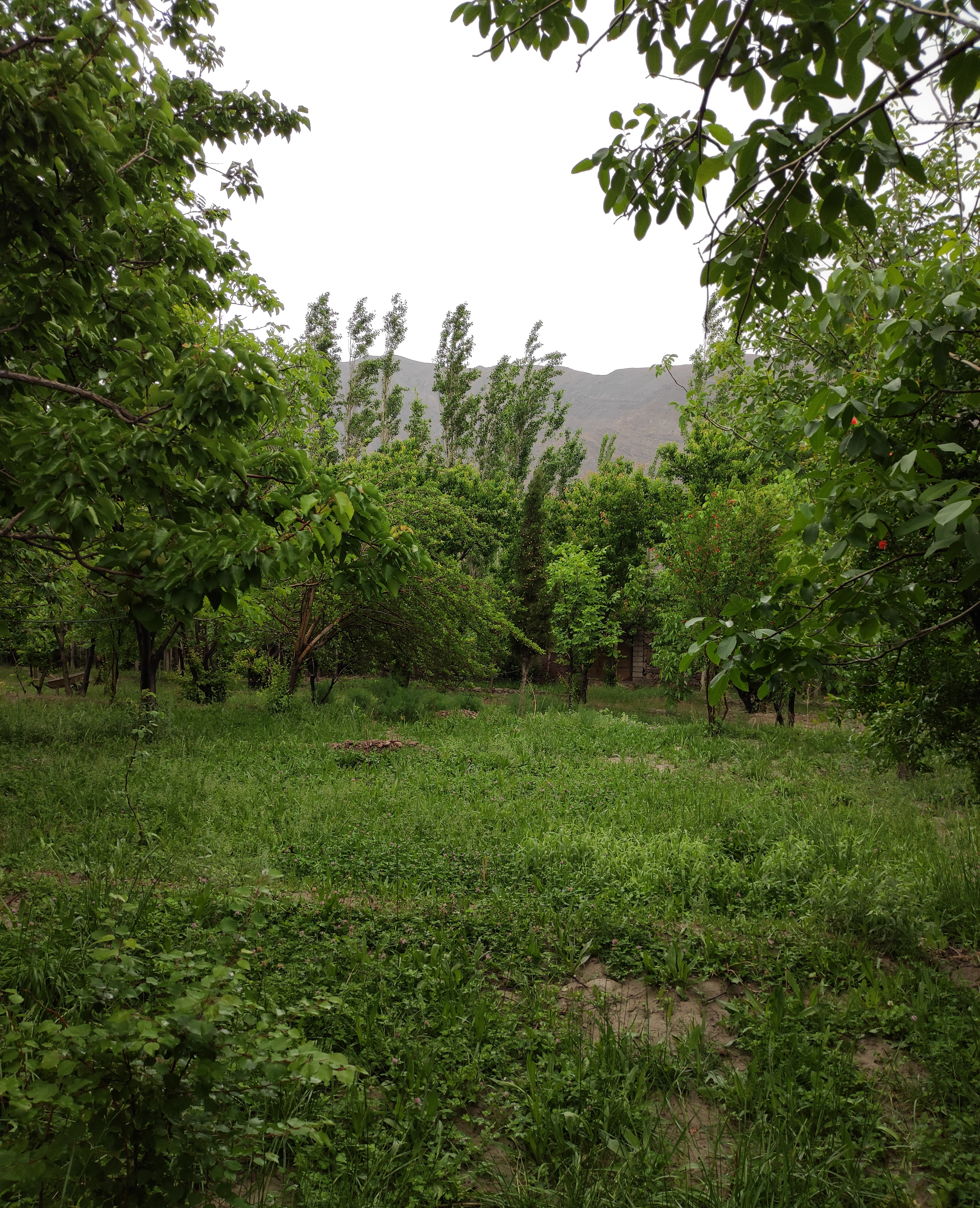
Garden in Sirch

Siroch (Persian: سيرچ) (Note: Also romanized as Sirch, Sīrch and Sīroch; also known as Sirj and Sirūj) is a village in, and the capital of, Siroch Rural District of Shahdad District, Kerman County, Kerman province, Iran. Despite its proximity to the city of Shahdad, it does not have a desert climate.

== Demographics ==
=== Population ===
At the time of the 2006 National Census, the village's population was 1,688 in 445 households. The following census in 2011 counted 2,599 people in 777 households. The 2016 census measured the population of the village as 1,550 people in 511 households. It was the most populous village in its rural district.
