= Shahbaz (bird) =

Fabled bird in Iranian mythology

Standard of Cyrus the Great (Derafsh Shahbaz), founder of the Achaemenid Empire, featuring the Shahbaz (see List of Iranian flags)

Shahbaz (Persian: شَهباز) is the name of a fabled bird in Persian mythology. It is described as having a body similar to an eagle, being bigger than a hawk or falcon, and having inhabited an area within the Zagros, the Alborz, and the Caucasus within Greater Iran. In ancient Persian mythology, the Shahbaz was a god who helped the Iranian peoples and guided the Faravahar to the Iranian lands.

== History ==
The word Shahbaz literally translates to "royal falcon". It was standard practice for the Persian Shah to keep a royal eagle or another bird of prey. This symbol represented both strength and aggressiveness. The ancient Egyptian deity of Horus is speculated to have been the archetype for the standard of Cyrus the Great, who founded the Achaemenid Empire.

British explorer Richard F. Burton considered the symbol to refer to the goshawk species Accipiter gentilis. Shahbaz could have alternatively referred to another common bird over the skies of the Iranian Plateau: the eastern imperial eagle, though this observation has never been claimed by historians as merited.

== See also ==
- Chamrosh, a Persian mythical bird that is described as having inhabited the Alborz Mountains
- Huma bird, a legendary bird in Persian mythology
- Simurgh, a mythical bird in Persian literature
- Derafsh
- Derafsh Shahdad
- Derafsh Kaviani
- Lion and Sun, Persian motif associated with pre-1979 Iran
- List of Iranian flags#Historical state flags
