= Jahr =

Village in Kerman province, Iran

Jahr Persian: جهر
- Village
- Location within Iran
- Coordinates: 30°10′23″N 57°51′25″E
- Country: Iran
- Province: Kerman
- County: Kerman
- District: Shahdad
- Rural District: Anduhjerd

Population (2016)
  - Total: 529
- Time zone: UTC+3:30 (IRST)

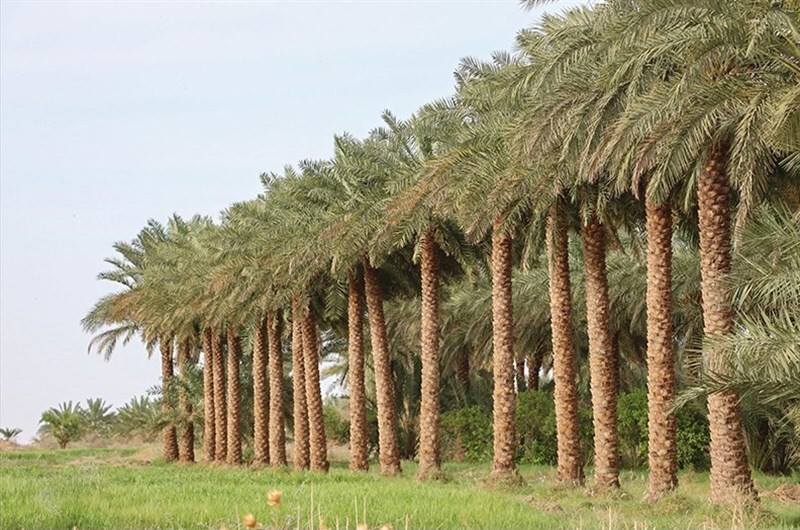
Jahr in 2021

Jahr (Persian: جهر) (Note: Also romanized as Jehār) is a village in Anduhjerd Rural District of Shahdad District, Kerman County, Kerman province, Iran.

== Demographics ==
=== Population ===
At the time of the 2006 National Census, the village's population was 458 in 113 households. The following census in 2011 counted 553 people in 145 households. The 2016 census measured the population of the village as 529 people in 163 households. It was the most populous village in its rural district.
