= Jahren =

Jahren is the German plural for the word year and a surname.

== People with the surname ==
- Anne Jahren (born 1963), Norwegian former cross-country skier
- Gunder Anton Johannesen Jahren (1858–1933), Norwegian politician for the Conservative Party
- Hope Jahren (born 1969), American geochemist and geobiologist
- Paul Jahren (1895–1963), Norwegian sport wrestler
- Silje Ekroll Jahren (born 1988), Norwegian orienteering competitor

== See also ==
- Jahr (disambiguation)
- Jaren (given name)
