= Derafsh Shahdad =

Historical bronze flag from 2400 BC, discovered in Iran

The Derafsh Shahdad (Persian: درفش شهداد), or Shahdad's standard, is a historical bronze standard discovered in the city of Shahdad in Kerman province, Iran. It is a square bronze object measuring 23 centimetres (9.1 in) x 23 centimetres (9.1 in), surmounted by an eagle figure and mounted on a pole.

== History ==
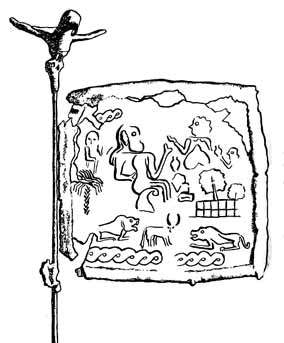
Rough sketch of Derafsh Shahdad

It is widely regarded as the world's oldest known flag or battle standard, dating from 2400 BCE. The artefact consists of a single bronze sheet fitted with a pole, hinge, and handle, all made of bronze. Over several millennia it has developed a green patina due to oxidation, but in antiquity it would have had a bright metallic sheen that reflected sunlight.

The surface is decorated in relief with images including a palm tree, two other trees, several human figures of varying sizes (likely dignitaries or elites), two lions, a humped bull (zebu), and several snakes resembling motifs found in the Jiroft culture. The central scene shows a seated man on a stool decorated with spiral patterns, gesturing toward a woman who is seated and kneeling before him. This main scene is set in a garden containing palm trees and broad-leaved trees, with additional seated and kneeling figures around it. Woven bands at the top and bottom of the composition are thought to represent flowing water. Below the principal figures is a subsidiary scene showing wild felines attacking a humped bull.

After its discovery the object was transferred to Tehran and is now preserved in the National Museum of Iran.

The eagle mounted on the pole is a significant element. In ancient Iranian mythology the bird is identified with the Simurgh, which symbolized the sun god. Under its Sumerian and Hurrian equivalents (Anzû and Zurvan), it also represented wisdom and the great mythological wind among the early inhabitants of the Iranian Plateau. Similar eagle standards are known to have surmounted the Derafsh Kaviani during the Achaemenid period.

== See also ==
- Jiroft culture
- Shahdad
- Derafsh
- Derafsh Shahbaz
- Derafsh Kaviani
- Lion and Sun flag
- List of Iranian flags#Historical state flags
