= Konaran, Kerman =

Konaran كناران
- Village
- Location within Iran
- Coordinates: 30°24′22″N 57°38′31″E
- Country: Iran
- Province: Kerman
- County: Kerman
- Bakhsh: Shahdad
- Rural District: Sirch

Population (2006)
  - Total: 18
- Time zone: UTC+3:30 (IRST)
  - Summer (DST): UTC+4:30 (IRDT)

Konaran (Persian: كناران, also Romanized as Konārān and Kanārān; also known as Konārū) is a village in Sirch Rural District, Shahdad District, Kerman County, Kerman Province, Iran. At the 2006 census, its population was 18, in 5 families.
