= Anduhjerd =

City in Kerman province, Iran

Anduhjerd Persian: اَنْدوهْجِرْد
- City
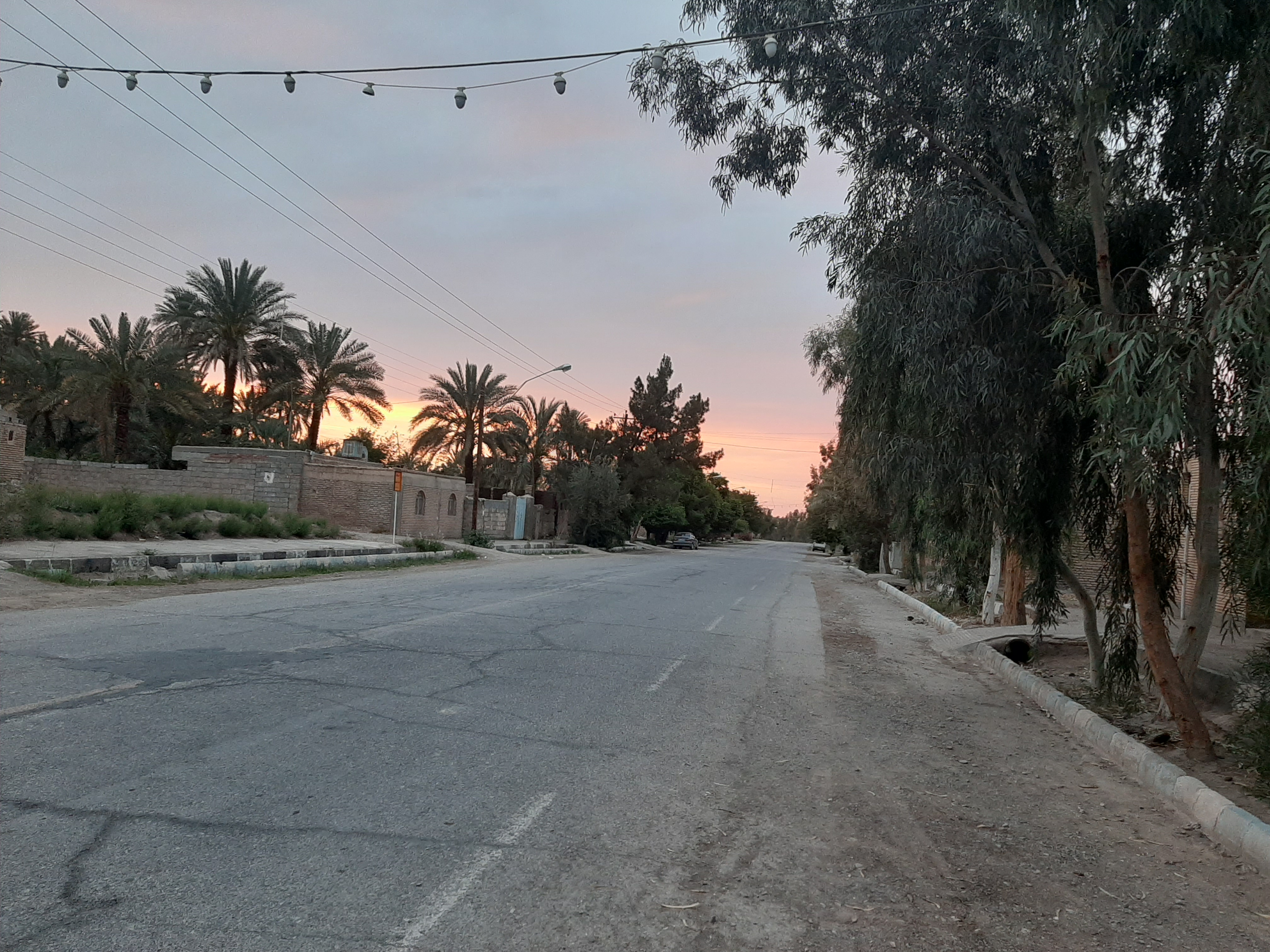

- Location within Iran
- Coordinates: 30°13′52″N 57°45′09″E
- Country: Iran
- Province: Kerman
- County: Kerman
- District: Shahdad

Population (2016)
  - Total: 4,041
- Time zone: UTC+3:30 (IRST)

Anduhjerd (Persian: اندوهجرد) (Note: Also known as Andigird and Andūhjerd) is a city in Shahdad District of Kerman County, Kerman province, Iran, serving as the administrative center for Anduhjerd Rural District.

== History ==
In 2004, the village of Anduhjerd, after merging with the village of Gudiz (گودیز), was elevated to the status of a city.

== Demographics ==
=== Population ===
At the time of the 2006 National Census, the city's population was 2,853 in 703 households. The following census in 2011 counted 3,589 people in 969 households. The 2016 census measured the population of the city as 4,041 people in 1,255 households.
