= Imperial standard of Iran =

Official flags of the Iranian crown

The Imperial Standards of Iran (Persian: پرچم‌های سلطنتی) were the personal official flags of the Shāhanshāh, Shahbānū, and Crown Prince of Iran, adopted at the beginning of 1971.

The official flag of Shāhanshāh consisted of a pale-blue field with the flag of Iran in the upper left corner and the Pahlavi coat of arms in the centre. At the top of the coat of arms was the Pahlavi Crown, created for the Coronation of Rezā Shāh in 1926. The Imperial motto of Pahlavi is "Mara dad farmud va Khod Davar Ast" ("Justice He bids me do, as He will judge me" or, alternatively, "He gave me power to command, and He is the judge").

Pale blue was the colour of the Imperial Family. The uniforms of the Imperial Guard included this colour to show their allegiance.

Imperial Standard of the Shāhanshāh of Iran.

Imperial Standard of the Shahbānū of Iran.

Imperial Standard of the Crown Prince of Iran.

== Historical ==
=== Qajar dynasty ===
Standard	Date use	Notes
	1848–1906	Standard of Naser al-Din Shah Qajar and Mozaffar ad-Din Shah Qajar
	1906–1910	Standard of Ahmad Shah Qajar
	1910–1925	Also used by Ahmad Shah Qajar

=== Pahlavi dynasty ===
Standard	Date use	Notes
	1926–1971	Standard of the Shahanshah of Iran (Emperor)
	1926–1971	Standard of the Vali Ahd of Iran (Crown Prince)
	1926–1971	Standard of a Shahpur of Iran (Other princes)

== See also ==
- Emblem of Iran
- Flag of Iran
