= Zavar-e Halkeh =

Zavar-e Halkeh زوارحلكه
- Village
- Location within Iran
- Coordinates: 29°12′36″N 57°23′24″E
- Country: Iran
- Province: Kerman
- County: Jiroft
- Bakhsh: Sarduiyeh
- Rural District: Sarduiyeh

Population (2006)
  - Total: 122
- Time zone: UTC+3:30 (IRST)
  - Summer (DST): UTC+4:30 (IRDT)

Zavar-e Halkeh (Persian: زوارحلكه, also Romanized as Zavār-e Ḩalkeh; also known as Zavār) is a village in Sarduiyeh Rural District, Sarduiyeh District, Jiroft County, Kerman Province, Iran. At the 2006 census its population was 122, in 16 families.
