= Derafsh Kaviani =

Sasanian-era Persian royal standard

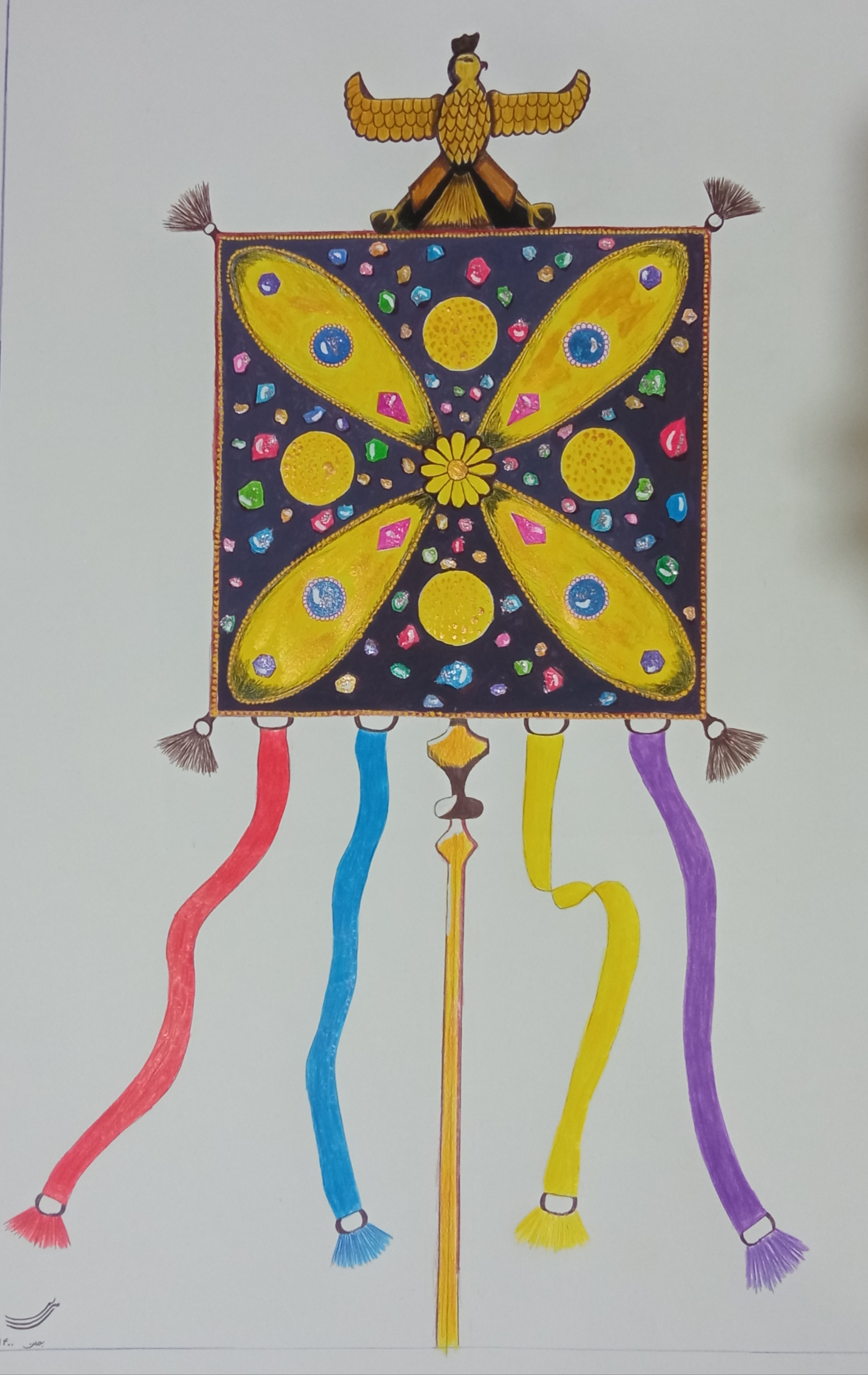
Artist's rendition of the Derafsh Kaviani.

The Derafsh Kaviani (Persian: درفش کاویانی, lit. 'Standard of Kaveh') was the legendary and historical national flag of pre-Islamic Iran, notably serving as the official standard of the Sasanian Empire (224–651).

It is identified with several figures in Iranian mythology, namely Kaveh the Blacksmith, but also Jamshid and Fereydun. The symbols are rooted in legendary accounts dating back to the Achaemenid Empire. In light of the Muslim conquest of Iran, the derafsh became especially significant as a representation of Iranian nationalism, which was the driving force behind the Iranian Intermezzo. Today, it continues to feature in Iranian culture, particularly literature, and is used by the Republic of Tajikistan as official heraldry.

== History ==
=== Origins ===
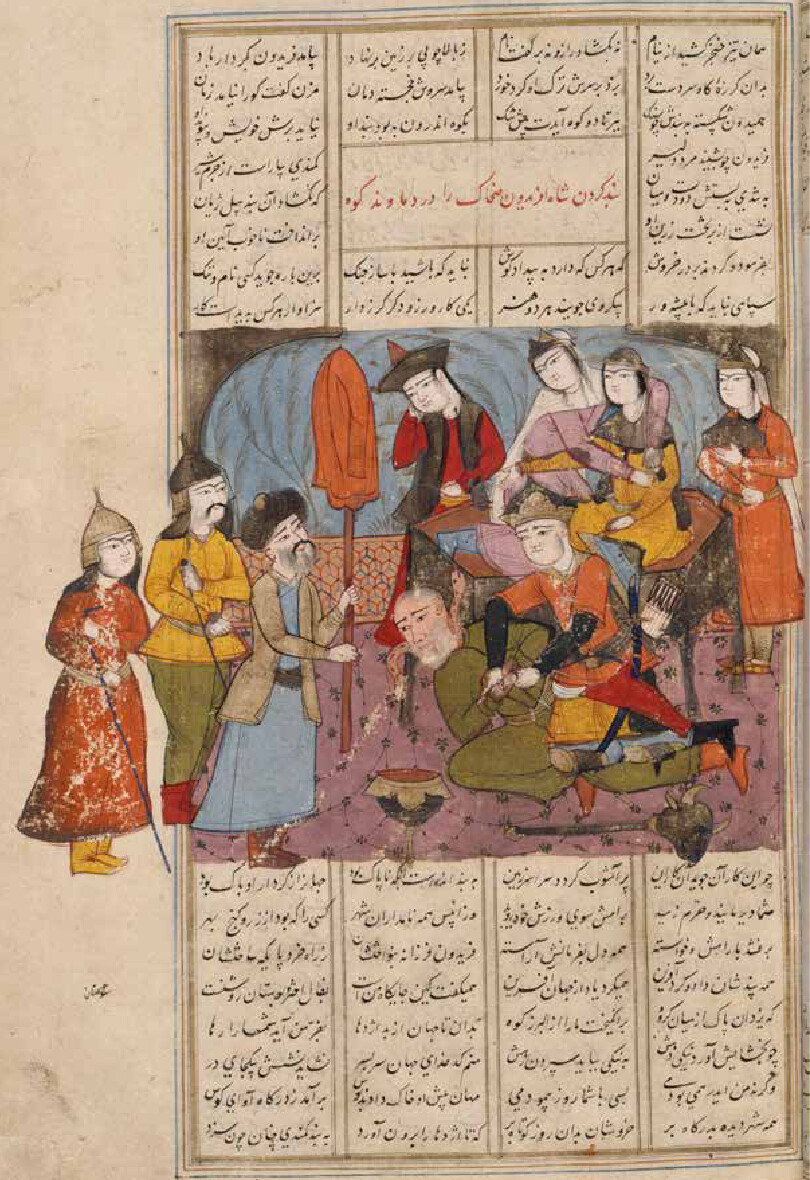
Zahhak bound by Fereydun, whilst Kaveh the Blacksmith is holding a apron-banner. From a mid-17th-century Safavid miniature.

According to a story in Iranian mythology, the Iranian throne was once seized by the cruel tyrant Zahhak, who ruled for generations, feeding the two serpents on his shoulders two men each day.

When Zahhak's servants took the youngest son of Kaveh the Blacksmith, he became enraged, as his other sons had already been fed to the serpents. He then raised a banner to mark the beginning of his uprising, which eventually led to the overthrow of Zahhak and the restoration of the legitimate heir, Fereydun.

Kaveh's banner was his own leather apron wrapped around a wooden spear, which Fereydun had decorated with gems, gold and brocade and tassels of red, yellow (or blue), and violet. The banner became the imperial standard of pre-Islamic Iran, and became known as the Derafsh Kaviani, meaning "Standard of the Kay(s)" (Kings), or "Standard of Kaveh".

The flag was said to have passed on through successive dynasties, Achaemenids, Seleucids, Parthians, and Sasanians, who ruled Iran from the 3rd to the middle of the 7th century. Throughout this period, the flag was decorated with gold and gems by the rulers of Iran. However, there is little physical proof of the Derafsh Kaviani existing before the Sasanian Empire.

=== Pre-Islamic era ===
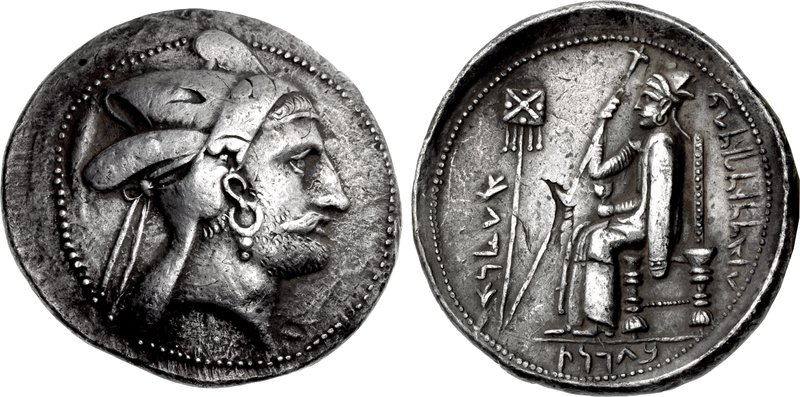
Coin of Baydad, frataraka (governor) of Persis during the Seleucid period. The Derafsh Kaviani is depicted on the obverse in an effort to maintain ties to the Achaemenid Empire.

The Avesta, Achaemenid, and Parthian texts do not specifically mention the Derafsh Kaviani. A number of academics have suggested that a damaged section of the Alexander Mosaic from Pompeii, which depicts the defeat of the Achaemenid ruler Darius III by Alexander the Great at the Battle of Issus, features the Derafsh Kaviani. According to Xenephon, a golden eagle was the standard of the Achaemenids. Iranian coins from the 3rd and 2nd centuries BCE show depictions of the Derafsh Kaviani, including Baydad, frataraka (governor) of Persis during the Seleucid period.

According to Shapur Shahbazi, the imperial standard of the Parthian Empire seems to have been the Derafsh Kaviani. During the Sasanian era, it served as a key representation of imperial power. It had a heavily bejewelled purple background, a star (akthar) as the emblem, and tassels in red, golden, and purple. It was also commonly referred to as the Akhtar-e Kāvīān due to the star.

The collapse of the Sasanian Empire was symbolised by the capture of the Derafsh Kaviani by Arab-Muslim troops after the Battle of al-Qadisiyyah and the death of the Sasanian commander-in-chief, Rostam Farrokhzad. From the pre-Islamic era till the present, the Derafsh Kaviani persisted in public consciousness of the Persianate world.

=== Iranian Intermezzo ===
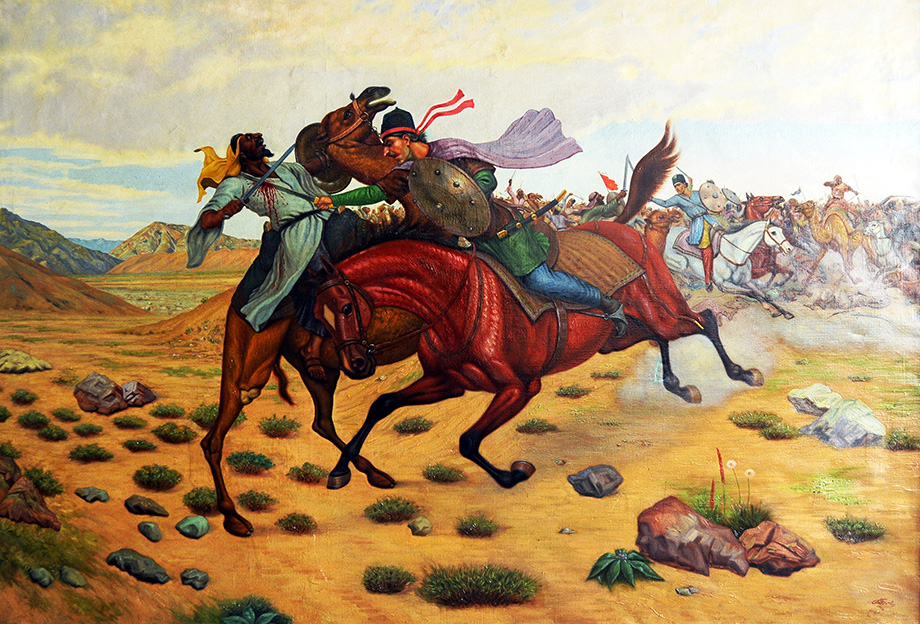
The army of Ya'qub ibn al-Layth fighting the caliphate, made by the Iranian painter Abbas Rassam Arjangi in 1948

The Derafsh-e Kaviani was revived as a symbol of pre-Islamic Iran during the Iranian Intermezzo. Iranians showed the adaptability of pre-Islamic symbols by recovering them within a now-Islamicised Iranian setting as they started reclaiming independence following hundreds of years of rule by the caliphate. The Saffarid dynasty (861–1002), one of the first independent Iranian Muslim states, was established in the late 9th century by Ya'qub ibn al-Layth al-Saffar (r. 861–879), a coppersmith from southern Iran. One of his secretaries composed a poem on his behalf to inspire his countrymen throughout his military campaigns: "With me is the banner of Kabi, through which I hope to rule the nations."

By raising the Derafsh Kaviani, Ya'qub ibn al-Layth presented his revolt against Arab rule as a continuation of the legendary uprising led by Kaveh. Ya'qub ibn al-Layth also declared that "the inheritance of the kings of Persia has fallen to my lot." His actions illustrated how the Islamic era still retained assumed and/or actual symbols of the Sasanian Empire, along with the legitimacy and connection to the past that these symbols provided. Ya'qub ibn al-Layth appears to have considered creating a banner in the style of the Derafsh Kaviani, but the effort was never carried out.

The Derafsh Kaviani lost its relevance after the Iranian Intermezzo, probably due to the dominance of dynasties of Turkic origin over the Islamic world until the 20th century, and how perceptions of legitimacy in rulership and authority changed in the post-Mongol era. However, until the Lion and Sun symbol gained prominence, Iranians continued to choose a banner with a star.

=== Modern era ===
The Derafsh Kaviani and its association to the Iranians first re-emerged in late Mughal India. This was a response to British expansion, which led to the Persian speakers in seeking a new source of legitimacy rooted in their shared language and historical heritage. The well-known poet Ghalib (1797–1869), who lived in Mughal India and wrote in Persian and Urdu, reprinted his literary critique Qate-e Borhan ("The cutting argument") in 1865 under the new title Derafsh-e kaviyani. It was a critique of the popular Persian dictionary Burhan-i Qati by Mohammad-Hoseyn Tabrizi (1600–1651), advocating instead for the removal of Arabic loanwords in Persian. Many scholars were offended by this text, which sparked a heated debate. The Derafsh Kaviani, which represented an Iran without Arab domination, was thus linked with a pure form of Persian. Iranian proto-nationalists, who also advocated for language purism, appeared to have factored this in.

Iranian nationalists associated Kaveh and the Derafsh Kaviani with a revolutionary and patriotic Iranian mindset during the ensuing decades. Early Iranian nationalists regarded Islam and Arabs as foreign to Iran and the cause of the nation's current failure, claiming that their pre-Islamic past was their true nature. According to the secular nationalist and activist Mirza Aqa Khan Kermani (1854/55–1896), Kaveh taught the "nations of the world how to remove oppression and repel the repression of despotic kings," an accomplishment for which Iranians should "truly be proud." In his memoir, journalist and historian Nazem ol-Eslam Kermani (1863/64–1918) introduced the Iranian Constitutional Revolution of 1905–1911 by citing the story of Kaveh. In 1909, the Derafsh Kaviani was used in a poem as a metaphor for nationalist and revolutionary renewal.

Today amongst Iranian nationalists, the Derafsh Kaviani has come to represent protest and disobedience against the Islamic Republic of Iran, which they criticise as a "Arab" state. They see the flag as a symbol of Iranian identity's alleged perseverance in the face of occupation, a lack of autonomy, or false leadership. The Derafsh Kaviani is frequently seen at demonstrations against the Islamic Republic as opposition parties deemed it to be an effective symbol to unite Iranians against the Islamic aspect of the regime.

== Presidential standard of the Republic of Tajikistan ==
Presidential standard of Tajikistan, 2006–present

The standard of the president of Tajikistan was introduced in 2006, on the occasion of the inauguration ceremony for the third term of Emomali Rahmon as head of state. It uses the same tricolour, charged with a depiction of the Derafsh Kāviān, the Sasanian royal standard; inside the Derafsh Kāviān is a depiction of a winged lion against a blue sky under a smaller representation of the crown and seven stars. State media also refer to the standard as the "first and original Tajik national flag".

== See also ==
- Derafsh
- Derafsh Shahdad
- Derafsh Shahbaz
- Lion and Sun flag
- List of Iranian flags#Historical state flags

== Sources ==
- Dadparvar, Shabnam; Shams, Ismail (2025). Chinese, Kurds, Iranians and the Silk Road: A Historical Perspective. Cambridge Scholars Publishing. ISBN 978-1036447847.
- Khaleghi-Motlagh, Djalal (1994). "Derafš-e Kāvīān". In Yarshater, Ehsan (ed.). Encyclopædia Iranica (Online ed.). Encyclopædia Iranica Foundation. ISBN 978-1568590264.
- Lewental, D. Gershon (2024). "Symbol of (Iranian) Empire: The Sāsānian Imperial Standard (Derafsh-e kāviyān) from Arab-Islamic Conquest Narratives to Modern Nationalist Myths". History & Memory. 36 (2). Indiana University Press: 5–38. doi:10.2979/ham.00008.
- Shahbazi, Alireza Shapur (1986). "Army i. Pre-Islamic Iran". Encyclopaedia Iranica, Vol. II, Fasc. 5. pp. 489–499.
- Shahbazi, Alireza Shapur (1999). "Flags i. Of Persia". In Yarshater, Ehsan (ed.). Encyclopædia Iranica (Online ed.). Encyclopædia Iranica Foundation. ISBN 978-0933273566.
