= Konaru, Kerman =

Konaru كنارو
- Village
- Location within Iran
- Coordinates: 28°11′31″N 58°52′31″E
- Country: Iran
- Province: Kerman
- County: Rigan
- Bakhsh: Central
- Rural District: Gavkan

Population (2006)
  - Total: 169
- Time zone: UTC+3:30 (IRST)
  - Summer (DST): UTC+4:30 (IRDT)

Konaru (Persian: كنارو, also Romanized as Konārū) is a village in Gavkan Rural District, in the Central District of Rigan County, Kerman Province, Iran. At the 2006 census, its population was 169, in 23 families.
