= Kiumars Pourahmad =

Iranian film director (1949–2023)

- کیومرث پوراحمد
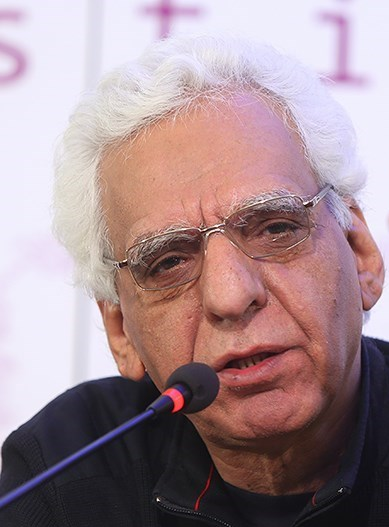
- Pourahmad at the 34th Fajr Film Festival
- Born: 16 December 1949; Najafabad, Iran
- Died: 5 April 2023 (aged 73); Bandar-e Anzali, Iran
- Burial place: Behesht-e Zahra, Iran
- Occupations: Film director, screenwriter, novelist, song writer, producer and editor
- Years active: 1979–2023
- Spouses: Effat Shamohammadi (1972–1989); Zahra Rabbi
- Children: Pegah Pourahmad, Pardis Pourahmad, Maryam Pourahmad

Kiumars Pourahmad (Persian: کیومرث پوراحمد; 16 December 1949 – 5 April 2023) was an Iranian film director, screenwriter, film editor, film producer and novelist. He is best known for his TV Series, The Tales of Majid.

== Biography ==
He was born in Najafabad on 16 December 1949. He later moved to Tehran where he worked as a writer and film critic in the Film magazine. On the morning of 5 April 2023, at the age of 73, Pourahmad was found dead under suspicious circumstances, in a rented villa in Bandar-e Anzali. The police are still investigating his death.

== Filmography ==
=== Film ===
- Tatoureh, 1984
- Bibi Chelchele, 1984
- Goyar, 1987
- The Harbour, 1989
- Silent Hunt, 1990
- The Shame, 1992
- The Morning After, 1992
- Bread and Poem, 1993
- For the Sake of Haniyeh, 1994
- Khaharan-e-gharib, 1995
- Yalda Night, 2001
- Gol-e Yakh, 2005
- Noke Borj, 2005
- The Night Bus, 2007
- Where Are My Shoes?, 2016
- Blade and Termeh, 2019
- The Night Guardian, 2022
- The case is open, 2023

=== Television ===
- The Tales of Majid, 1990
- Sarenakh, 1997
- Parantez Baz, 2010
