= Konaruiyeh =

Konaruiyeh كناروييه
- Village
- Location within Iran
- Coordinates: 28°51′25″N 57°14′07″E
- Country: Iran
- Province: Kerman
- County: Jiroft
- Bakhsh: Central
- Rural District: Esfandaqeh

Population (2006)
  - Total: 219
- Time zone: UTC+3:30 (IRST)
  - Summer (DST): UTC+4:30 (IRDT)

Konaruiyeh (Persian: كناروييه, also Romanized as Konārū’īyeh; also known as Kenārū and Konārū) is a village in Esfandaqeh Rural District, in the Central District of Jiroft County, Kerman Province, Iran. At the 2006 census, its population was 219, across 44 families.
