= Konaran, Hormozgan =

Konaran كناران
- Village
- Location within Iran
- Coordinates: 27°19′38″N 56°48′19″E
- Country: Iran
- Province: Hormozgan
- County: Bandar Abbas
- Bakhsh: Takht
- Rural District: Shamil

Population (2006)
  - Total: 124
- Time zone: UTC+3:30 (IRST)
  - Summer (DST): UTC+4:30 (IRDT)

Konaran (Persian: كناران, also Romanized as Konārān and Kenārān; also known as Kenārū) is a village in Shamil Rural District, Takht District, Bandar Abbas County, Hormozgan Province, Iran. At the 2006 census, its population was 124, in 22 families.
