= Takab Rural District (Kerman County) =

Rural district in Kerman province, Iran

Takab Rural District Persian: دهستان تكاب
- Rural District
- Location within Iran
- Coordinates: 30°57′16″N 58°30′29″E
- Country: Iran
- Province: Kerman
- County: Kerman
- District: Shahdad
- Capital: Estehkam

Population (2016)
  - Total: 5,890
- Time zone: UTC+3:30 (IRST)

Takab Rural District (Persian: دهستان تكاب) is in Shahdad District of Kerman County, Kerman province, Iran. Its capital is the village of Estehkam.

== Demographics ==
=== Population ===
At the time of the 2006 National Census, the rural district's population was 4,868 in 1,127 households. There were 6,276 inhabitants in 1,629 households at the following census of 2011. The 2016 census measured the population of the rural district as 5,890 in 1,705 households. The most populous of its 51 villages was Hemmatabad-e Olya, with 606 people.
