= Kaveh the Blacksmith =

Legendary figure in Persian mythology

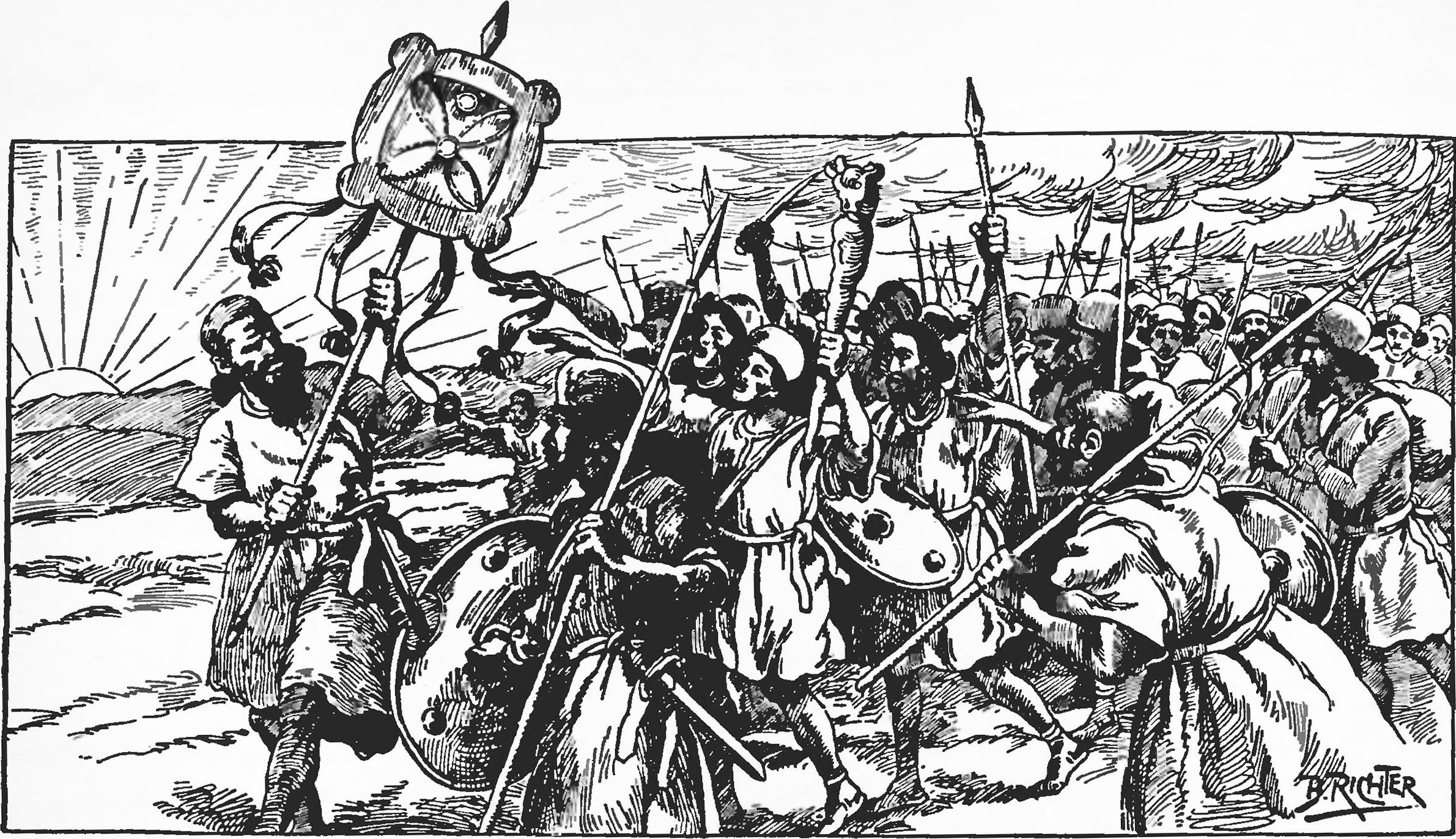
Illustration of Kaveh surrounded by his followers and holding the Derafsh Kaviani aloft in Kaveh, a magazine from World War I that was named after him.

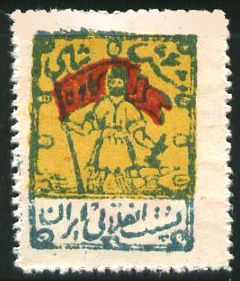
Kaveh the blacksmith on a stamp of the Iranian Soviet Socialist Republic, 1920, with one hand holding a hammer, and the other anachronistically waving the Republic's Red Flag.

Kaveh the Blacksmith (Persian: کاوه آهنگر, romanized: Kāveh Āhangar, IPA: [kʰɒːˈve ʔɒːɦæŋˈɡæɹ]) is a figure in Iranian mythology who leads an uprising against a ruthless foreign ruler, Zahāk. His story is narrated in the Shahnameh, the national epic of Iranians, by the 10th-century Persian poet Ferdowsi.

According to ancient legends, Kāveh was a blacksmith who launched a national uprising against the evil foreign tyrant Zahāk, after losing two of his children to serpents of Zahāk. Kāveh expelled the foreigners and re-established the rule of Iranians. Kāveh and the people went to the Alborz Mountains in Damāvand, where Fereydun, son of Ābtin and Faranak was living. Then a young man, Fereydun agreed to lead the people against Zahāk. Zahāk had already left his capital, which fell to Fereydun's troops with little resistance. Fereydun released all of Zahāk's prisoners.

Kāveh is a Persian mythological character known for his resistance against Zahāk in Iran. In modern times, Kāveh is sometimes invoked for political aims. As a symbol of resistance, he raised his leather apron on a spear. This flag, known as Derafsh Kaviani, was later decorated with precious jewels and became the symbol of Persian sovereignty for hundreds of years, until conquered by the Arabs, following the defeat of the Sassanids at the 636 Battle of al-Qadisiyyah. Ya'qub ibn al-Layth al-Saffar, who rebelled against the Abbasid Caliphate, claimed the inheritance of the kings of Persia and sought "to revive their glory," in 867 he sent a poem written by himself to the Abbasid caliph Al-Mu'tazz, stating: "With me is the Derafsh Kaviani, through which I hope to rule the nations." In later times, Kāveh the Blacksmith was invoked by Iranian nationalists starting from the generation of Mirza Fatali Akhundov. His name was used as the title of a nationalist newspaper in 1916, and in 1920, adorned the canton of the flag of the Persian Socialist Soviet Republic (known as the Soviet Republic of Gilan).

Mehregan is the celebration for Fereydun's victory over Zahāk.

The dynasty of Karen Pahlav (also known as the House of Karen) claimed to be Kāveh's descendants.

== Kurdish mythology ==
Called Kawe-y Asinger (Sorani Kurdish: کاوەی ئاسنگەر) in Kurdish mythology, some Kurds believe that the ancestors of the Kurds fled to the mountains to escape the oppression of an Assyrian king named Zahhak, who is later killed and overthrown at the hands of Kawe. Hêwa S. Xalid the Kurdish scholar from Indiana University claimed that Kurd means blacksmith in the old Iranian languages, and he supported his claim by taking the word from Ossetian language, which there Kurd means blacksmith. It is also believed that these people, like Kawe the Blacksmith who took refuge in the mountains over the course of history, later they were called by the profession of their ancestor and created a Kurdish ethnicity. Kawe is a geographical and symbolic figure in Kurdish nationalism. In common with other mythologies, Kurdish mythology sometimes is also used for political aims.

== See also ==
- Derafsh Kaviani
- Kurdalægon
- Tlepsh
- Vulcan
- Qarinvand dynasty
- Mashhad-e Kaveh
