= Siroch Rural District =

Rural district in Kerman province, Iran

Siroch Rural District Persian: دهستان سيرچ
- Rural District
- Location within Iran
- Coordinates: 30°18′44″N 57°31′46″E
- Country: Iran
- Province: Kerman
- County: Kerman
- District: Shahdad
- Capital: Siroch

Population (2016)
  - Total: 2,190
- Time zone: UTC+3:30 (IRST)

Siroch Rural District (Persian: دهستان سيرچ) is in Shahdad District of Kerman County, Kerman province, Iran. Its capital is the village of Siroch.

== Demographics ==
=== Population ===
At the time of the 2006 National Census, the rural district's population was 2,600 in 676 households. There were 3,549 inhabitants in 1,052 households at the following census of 2011. The 2016 census measured the population of the rural district as 2,190 in 730 households. The most populous of its 52 villages was Siroch, with 1,550 people.
