= Anduhjerd Rural District =

Rural district in Kerman province, Iran

Anduhjerd Rural District Persian: دهستان اندوهجرد
- Rural District
- Location within Iran
- Coordinates: 30°30′N 58°28′E
- Country: Iran
- Province: Kerman
- County: Kerman
- District: Shahdad
- Capital: Anduhjerd

Population (2016)
  - Total: 1,313
- Time zone: UTC+3:30 (IRST)

Anduhjerd Rural District (Persian: دهستان اندوهجرد) is in Shahdad District of Kerman County, Kerman province, Iran. It is administered from the city of Anduhjerd.

== Demographics ==
=== Population ===
At the time of the 2006 National Census, the rural district's population was 915 in 226 households. There were 1,309 inhabitants in 339 households at the following census of 2011. The 2016 census measured the population of the rural district as 1,313 in 396 households. The most populous of its 21 villages was Jahr, with 529 people.
