= Shahdad District =

District in Kerman province, Iran

Shahdad District Persian: بخش شهداد
- District
- Location within Iran
- Coordinates: 30°35′44″N 58°26′12″E
- Country: Iran
- Province: Kerman
- County: Kerman
- Capital: Shahdad

Population (2016)
  - Total: 18,651
- Time zone: UTC+3:30 (IRST)

Shahdad District (Persian: بخش شهداد) is in Kerman County, Kerman province, Iran. Its capital is the city of Shahdad.

== Demographics ==
=== Population ===
At the time of the 2006 National Census, the district's population was 15,333 in 3,742 households. The following census in 2011 counted 20,665 people in 5,601 households. The 2016 census measured the population of the district as 18,651 inhabitants in 5,707 households.

=== Administrative divisions ===
Shahdad District Population
Administrative Divisions	2006	2011	2016
Anduhjerd RD	915	1,309	1,313
Siroch RD	2,600	3,549	2,190
Takab RD	4,868	6,276	5,890
Anduhjerd (city)	2,853	3,589	4,041
Shahdad (city)	4,097	5,942	5,217
Total	15,333	20,665	18,651
RD = Rural District
