= Lion Flag =

Lion Flag may refer to:

- Flag of Sri Lanka, featuring a lion and commonly called Lion Flag
- Flag of Flanders, featuring a lion and called Flemish Lion or Lion Flag
- Lion and Sun flag, flag of Pahlavi Iran featuring a lion and sun

== See also ==
- Bear flag
