= Embassy of Iran, London =

Diplomatic mission of Iran in the United Kingdom

Embassy of Iran in London
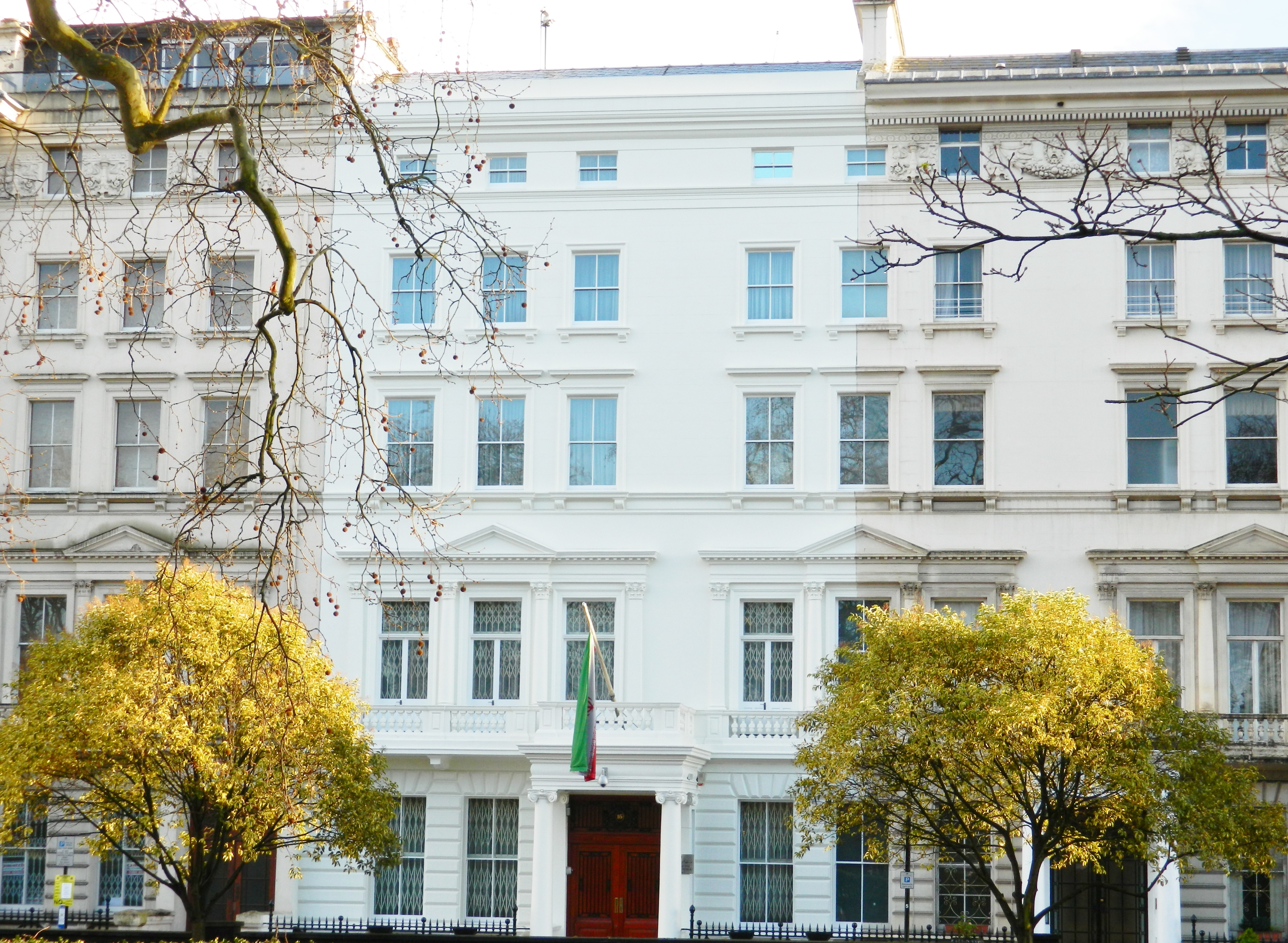
- Location: Knightsbridge, London
- Address: 16 Prince's Gate, London, SW7 1PT
- Coordinates: 51°30′5.5″N 0°10′20.4″W
- Ambassador: Ali Mousavi
- Website: Official website

The Embassy of Iran in London is the diplomatic mission of the Islamic Republic of Iran in the United Kingdom. It is located in a terrace overlooking Hyde Park in Knightsbridge, Westminster, London, next to the Embassy of Ethiopia. Iran also maintains a Consular Section at 50 Kensington Court, South Kensington. The embassy building, along with the Ethiopian Embassy and the Polish Institute and Sikorski Museum, is one of a group of Grade II listed stucco buildings.

== History ==
The embassy was the site of the 1980 Iranian Embassy siege in which members of the Iranian-Arab nationalist group, the Democratic Revolutionary Front for the Liberation of Arabistan, seized the building for several days before being overrun by the SAS. The embassy was severely damaged during the siege and did not re-open until 1993.

Following the 2011 attack on the British Embassy in Iran, the British government expelled all Iranian embassy staff and closed the embassy in protest, alleging government support for the attack. Between 2011 and 2014, Iranian interests in the UK were represented by the Omani Embassy. Anglo-Iranian relations have improved since the election of President Hassan Rouhani and the countries made plans to re-open the embassy.

On 20 February 2014, the Embassy was restored and the two countries agreed to restart diplomatic relations.

On 9 March 2018, four people from Khoddam Al-Mahdi were arrested after climbing onto the first-floor balcony of the Embassy and taking down the Iranian flag in an apparent protest against the government in Tehran due to the arrest of the Islamic scholar Hussein al-Shirazi in Qom three days earlier.

On 25 September 2022, there were angry protests outside the Embassy, mostly by the Iranian diaspora in the United Kingdom, following the death of Mahsa Amini in police custody on 16 September. Demonstrators waved the Lion and Sun flag and chanted "Death to the Islamic Republic". Five Metropolitan Police officers were injured and twelve arrests were made.

On 10 January 2026, a demonstrator part of a solidarity protest associated with the 2025–2026 Iranian uprising tore down the embassy's flag of the Islamic republic and replaced it with the Lion and Sun flag. The demonstrator was later arrested for aggravated trespass.

On 8 March 2026, around 200 demonstrators gathered outside the embassy in central London during protests to express support for United States and Israeli military strikes on Iran, while officers from the Metropolitan Police supervised the protest.

== Gallery ==
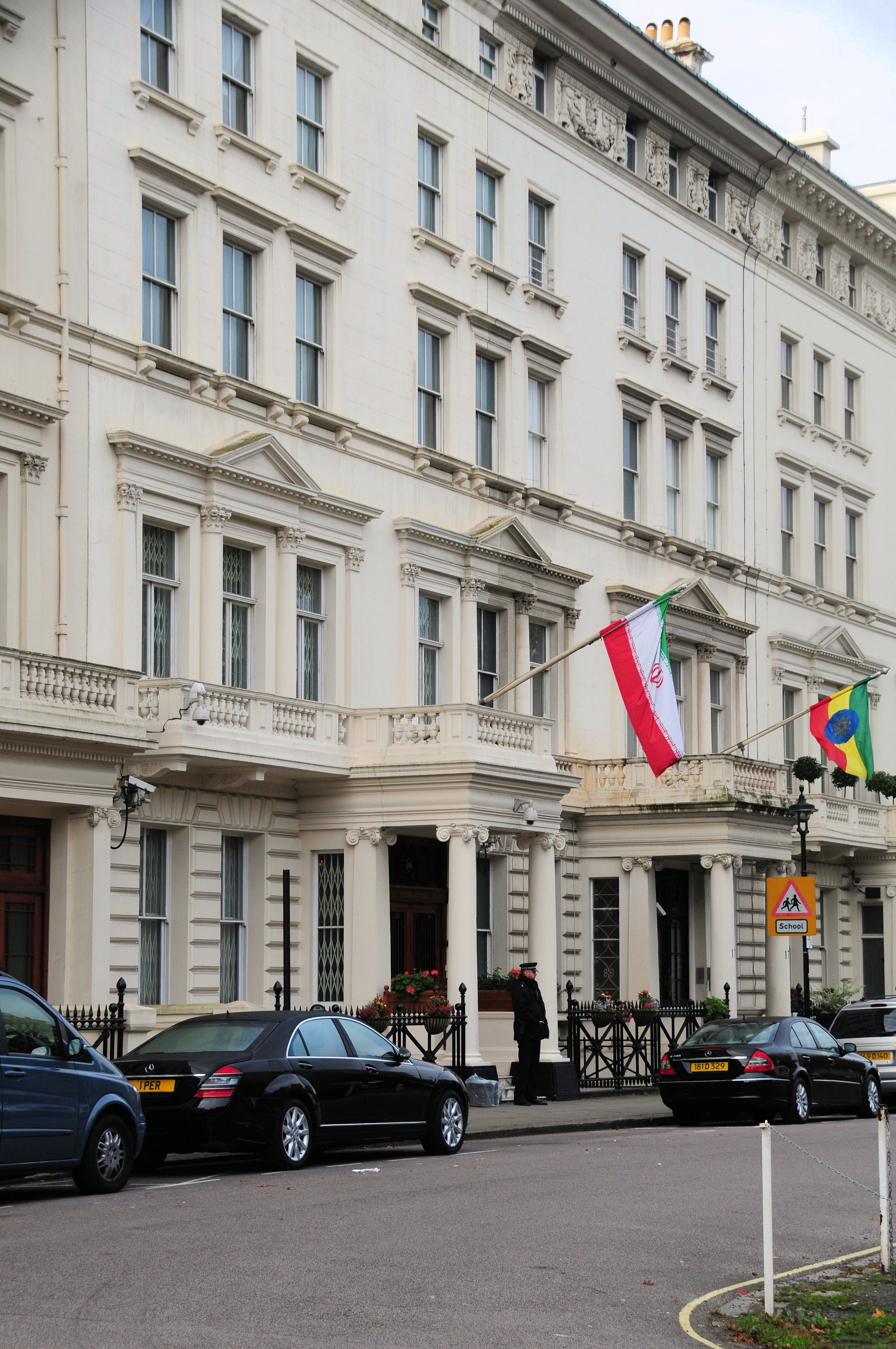
The embassy in 2008

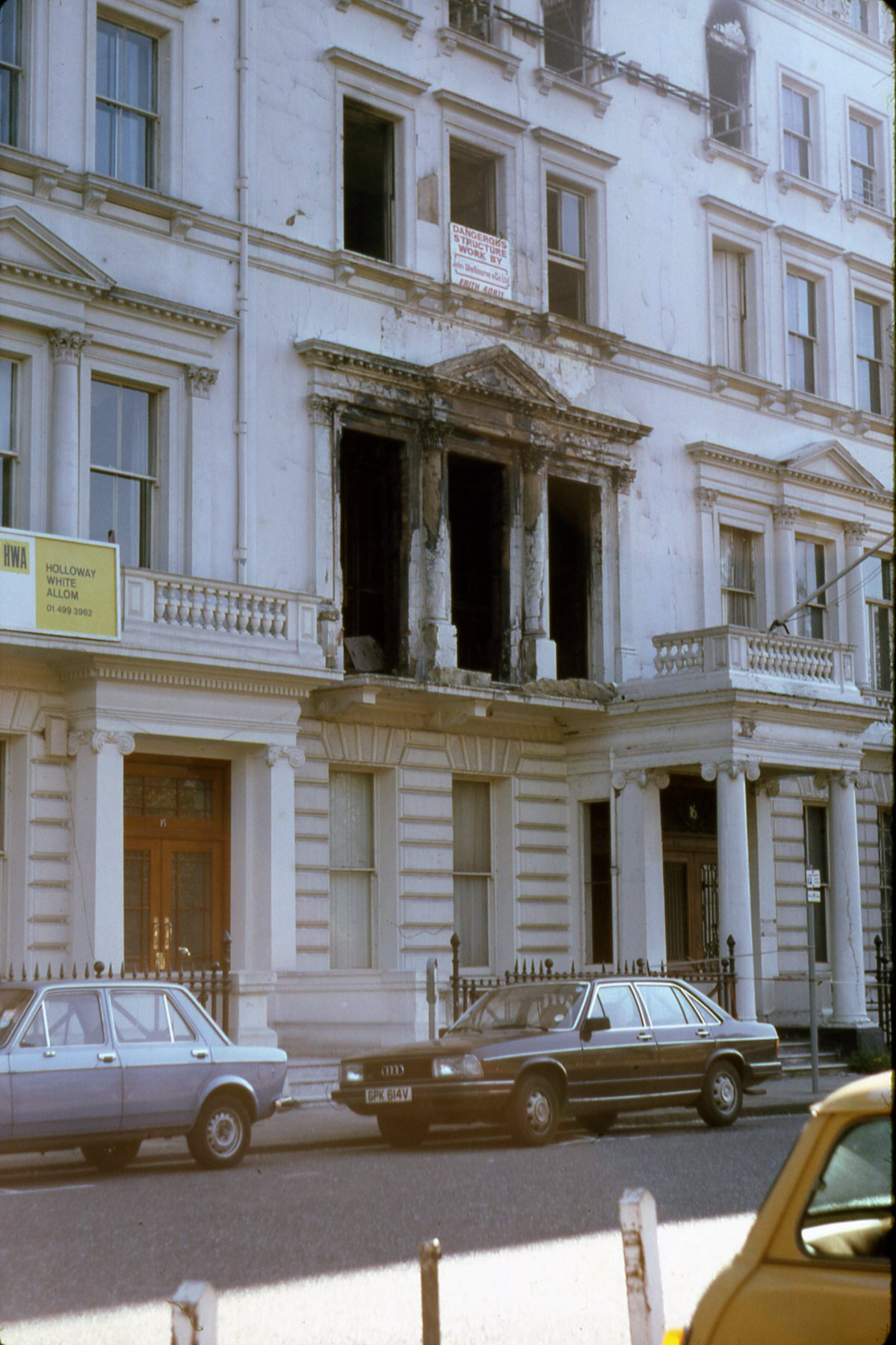
The embassy as it appeared after the hostage crisis, 1980

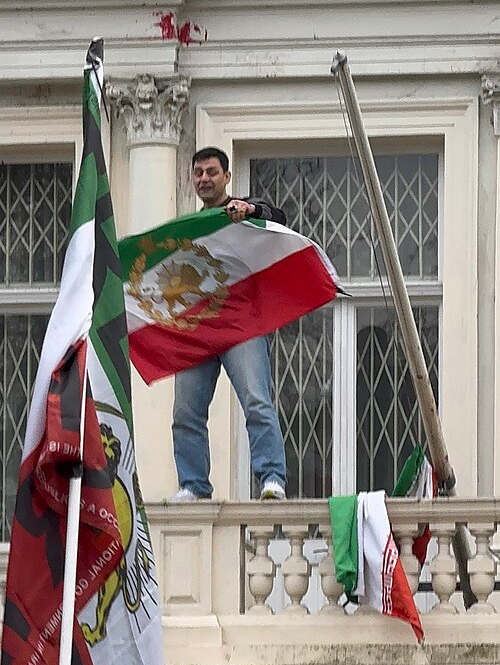
Protester tears down the flag of the Islamic Republic and holds up the Lion and Sun flag, 10 January 2026
