= Embassy of Oman, London =

Embassy of Oman in London
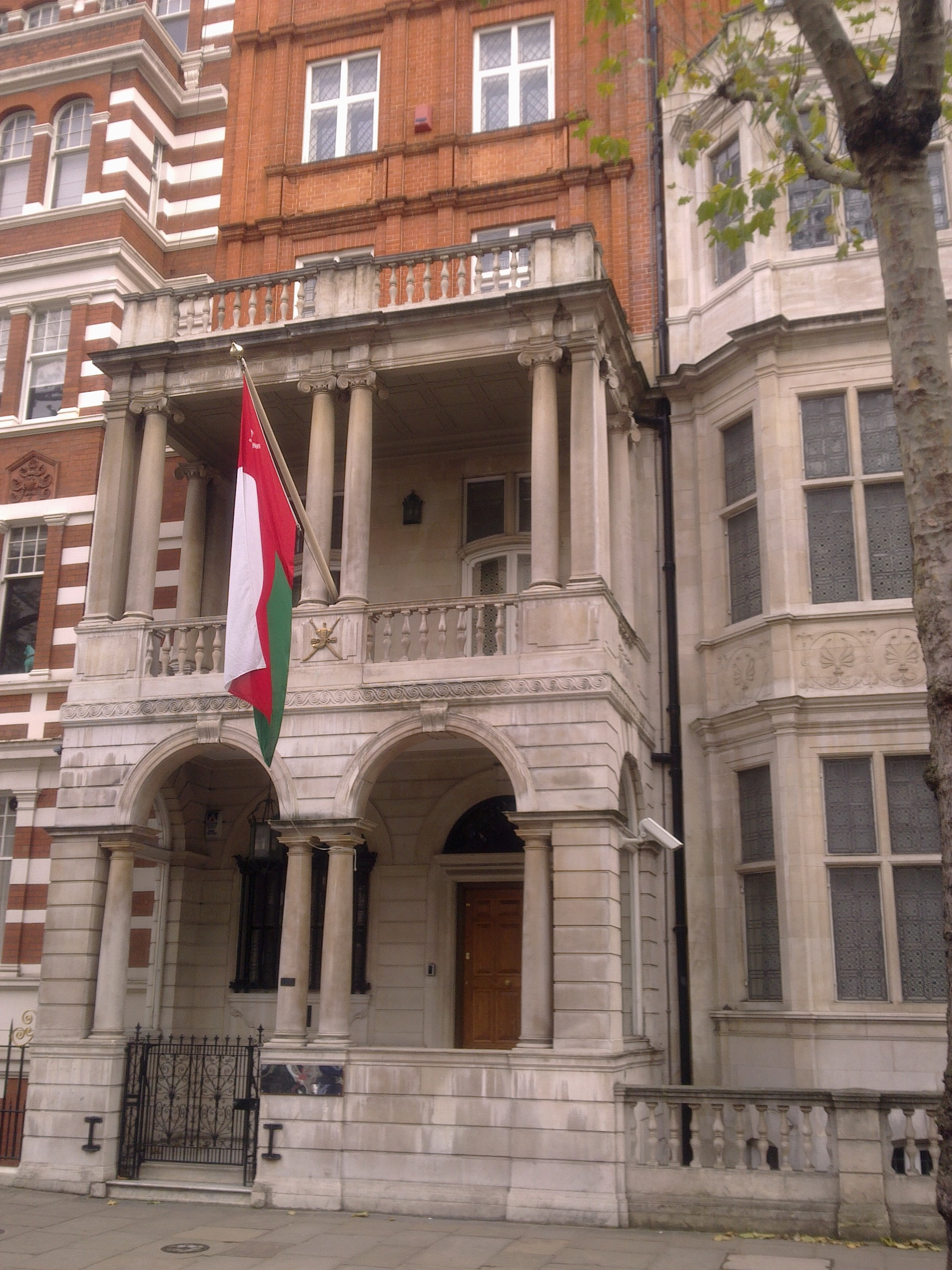
- Location: South Kensington, London
- Address: 167 Queen's Gate, London, SW7 5HE
- Coordinates: 51°29′51″N 0°10′45.2″W
- Ambassador: Badr Mohammed Badr Al Mantheri

The Embassy of Oman in London is the diplomatic mission of Oman in the United Kingdom. Oman represented Iranian interests in the UK between 2011 and 2014 as the Embassy of Iran was closed following the 2011 attack on the British Embassy in Iran. This service was no longer needed after Iran–United Kingdom relations improved following the election of President Hassan Rouhani, and the Iranian embassy reopened in February 2014.

Oman also maintains a separate building at 64 Ennismore Gardens, Knightsbridge which contains the Cultural, Health and Military Attachés.

== Gallery ==
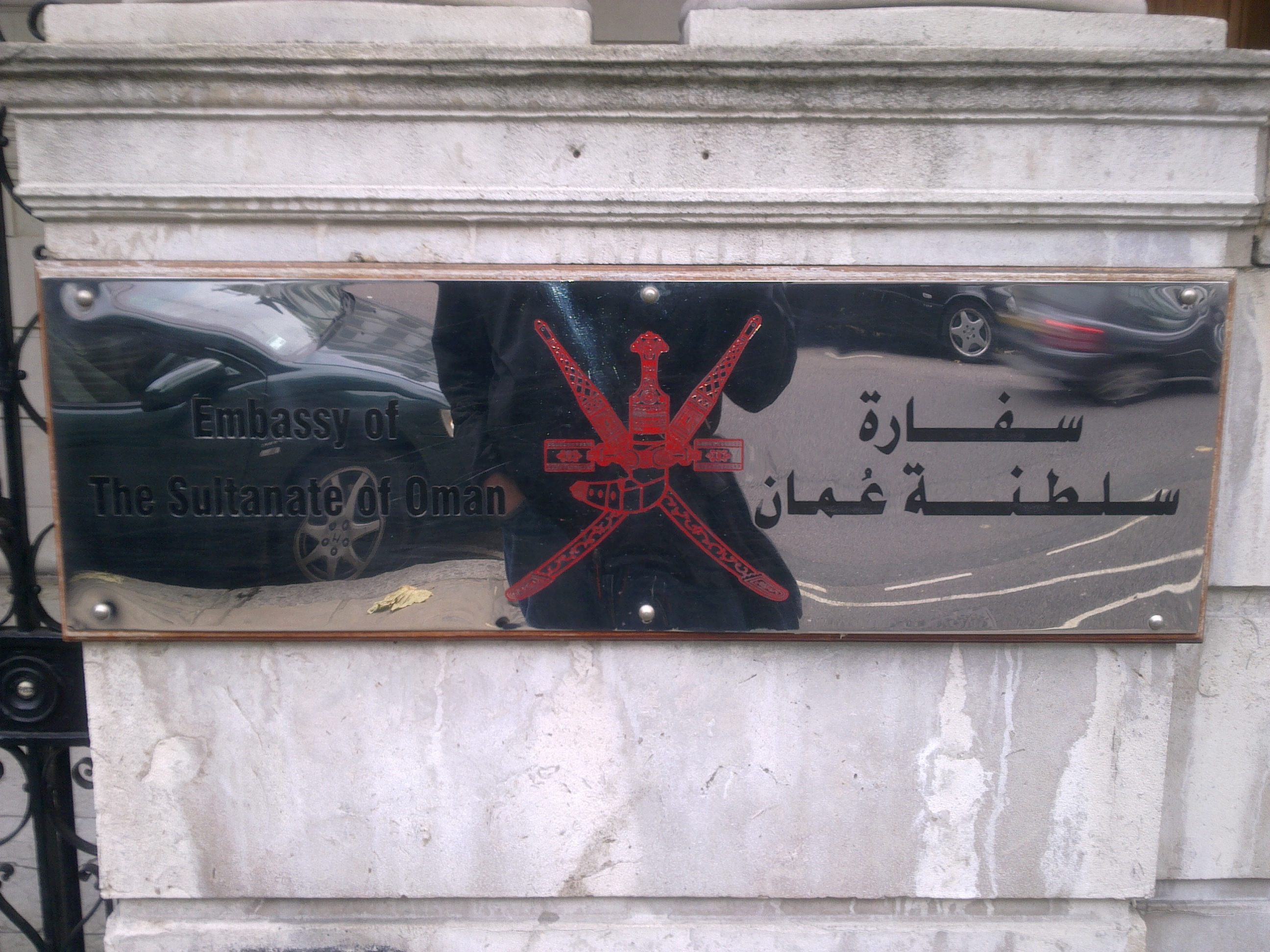
Plaque outside the embassy in Arabic and English depicting the National emblem of Oman
