= Lion and Sun flag =

Historical and opposition flag of Iran

Iran
- Standardised design, most commonly used by Iranians across all ideologies Another popular modern variant, primarily used among monarchists One of several historical designs in use during the Pahlavi dynasty
- Use: Civil and state flag, civil and state ensign
- Proportion: 4∶7
- Adopted: 7 October 1907; 119 years ago
- Relinquished: 1979 (de facto); 29 July 1980 (de jure) (Note: The flag of the Islamic Republic of Iran was officially adopted on this date, thus removing any ambiguity that the Lion and Sun flag continued to be used by sanctioned authorities.)
- Design: A horizontal tricolour of green, white, and red, with a gold Lion and Sun emblem in the centre.

The Lion and Sun flag (Note: Persian: پرچم شیر و خورشید, romanised: Parcham-e Shir o Khorshid) is a historic Iranian national and opposition flag consisting of a green–white–red horizontal tricolour charged with the Lion and Sun emblem. It served as the state flag of Iran from 1907 until the 1979 Islamic Revolution, after which it was strictly banned. Since then, the flag has had no official status but continues to be used as a historical and political symbol, particularly among diaspora Iranians and opposition movements.

== Flag description ==
=== Lion and Sun emblem ===
The emblem consists of a male lion in front of a rising sun, coloured in gold and centred on the white band. Its appearance has varied over time: in some versions, the lion holds a sword, while in others it stands unarmed, with all four paws on the ground. The sun is nowadays depicted as a simple disc with rays, though earlier designs often included a face. Some versions include a thin horizontal base beneath the lion. A crown was sometimes displayed above the emblem on the national flag, while the war flag and naval ensign additionally featured a surrounding wreath.

== History ==
=== Pre-Islamic origins ===
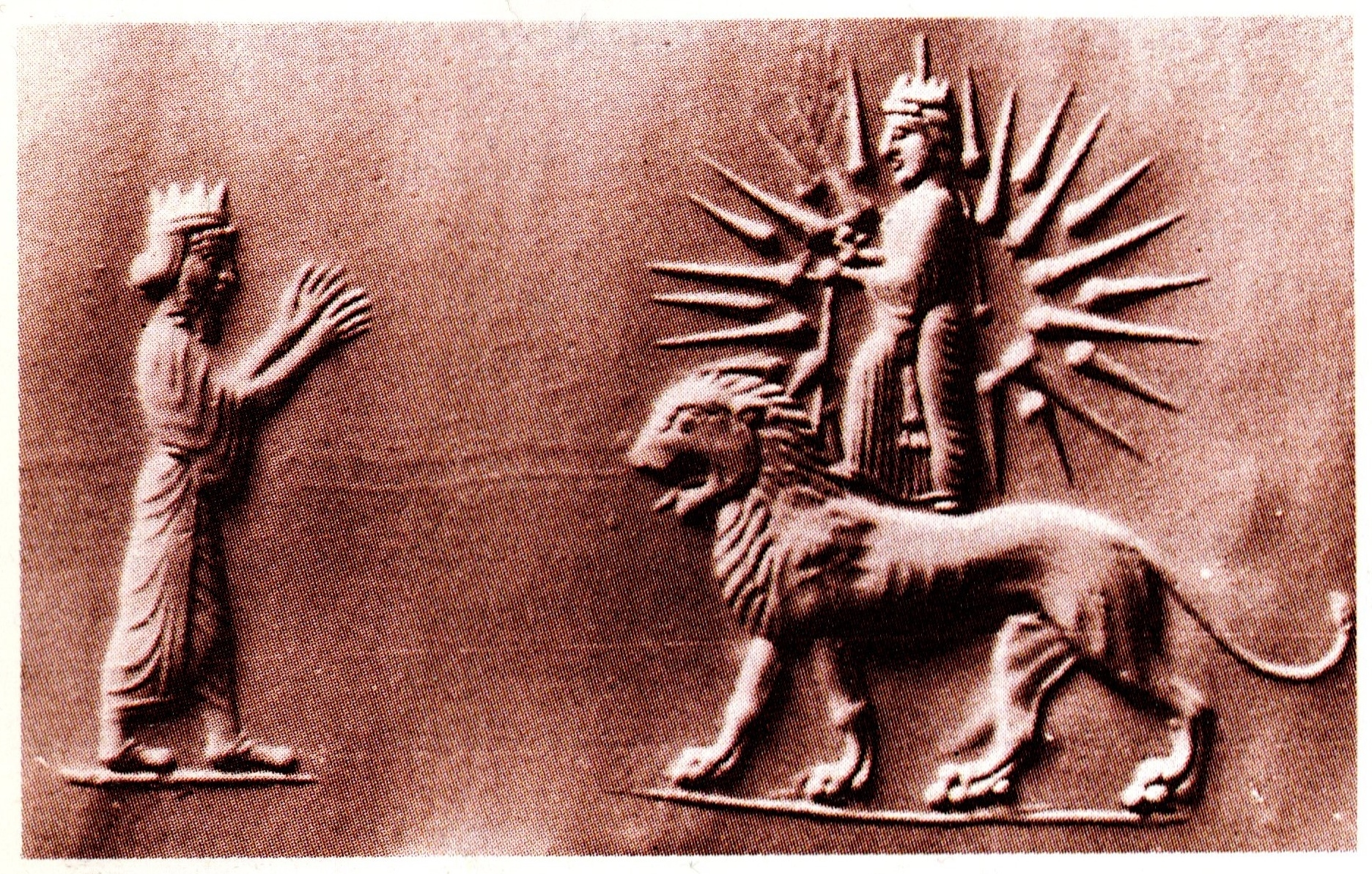
Achaemenid seal depicting Artaxerxes II together with Anahita in a Lion and Sun motif

The Lion and Sun is an emblem that is intrinsically Iranian and can be traced back thousands of years, even predating the Achaemenid era.

During the Achaemenid period, the Lion and Sun motif appeared in several forms. One such example is a seal depicting Artaxerxes II accompanied by Anahita, with the latter riding a lion with a sun symbolising Mithra appearing behind her.

=== Safavid and Qajar era ===
The emblem continued to appear intermittently throughout the centuries until the emblem was adopted during the Safavid era to distinguish the country's national identity from neighbouring powers, such as the Ottoman Empire with the star and crescent.

The Lion and Sun only became a national symbol during the Qajar era. One of the first appearances of the lion holding a sword on a flag was during the Russo-Persian War (1804–1813); the sword was added at the recommendation of Molla Ahmad Naraqi.

The first instance of the emblem appearing on a tricolour flag is thought to be on an early green–white–red design with thin green and red stripes, designed by Amir Kabir and used from 1848 to 1852 during the reign of Naser al-Din Shah Qajar. The first equal-height stripe design is said to have appeared by the late 1880s. These accounts are poorly documented and may be entirely unfounded, as they are far less certain than the flag officially adopted in 1907.

=== Late Qajar and Pahlavi era ===
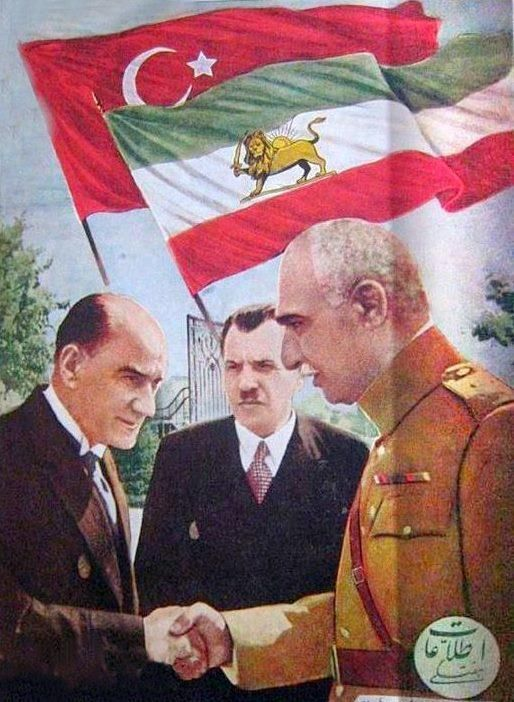
Illustration of a historic meeting between Mustafa Kemal Atatürk and Reza Shah in 1934, with the contemporary Iranian flag

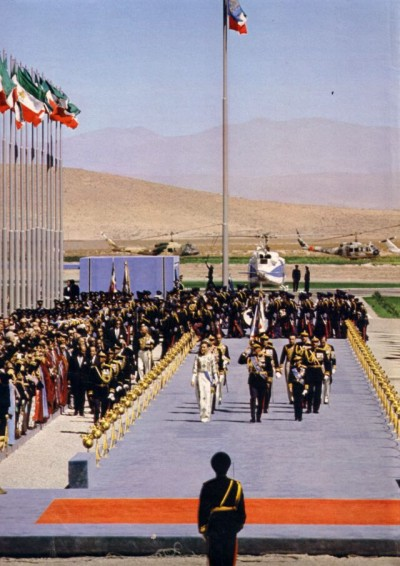
Numerous Lion and Sun flags hoisted at Pasargadae during the 2,500-year celebration of the Persian Empire, 1971

The first official version of the Lion and Sun flag was adopted in the wake of the Iranian Constitutional Revolution of 1906 and codified in the Supplementary Fundamental Laws of 7 October 1907 as the state flag of the country. The new banner was described as a tricolour of "green, white, and red, with the emblem of the Lion and the Sun." On 4 September 1910, a decree specified the exact details of the emblem, including the size and position of the lion, and the shape of its tail, sword, and sun. During this period, the colours of the flag were very pale, with the red appearing closer to pink in practice.

=== Post-Islamic revolution ===
Following the overthrow of the monarchy in 1979 at the onset of the Islamic Revolution, the interim government began phasing out the Lion and Sun in favour of the plain tricolour. However, after the Islamic takeover in 1980, the new government outlawed the use of the old flag entirely, justifying the restrictions by claiming that the banner was a symbol of the "oppressive Westernising monarchy," despite the emblem's traditional Shia usage. In 1980, Ayatollah Ruhollah Khomeini demanded the "ominous" Lion and Sun be removed from all government offices as an "artifact of the tyrannical regime".

Design evolution over time

Supposed tricolour designed by Amir Kabir between 1848 and 1852, modern reconstruction

Supposed equal-stripe tricolour reported in 1886, modern reconstruction

State flag of Persia (1907–1933), modern reconstruction

State flag of Iran (1933–1964), modern reconstruction

State flag of Iran (1964–1979), modern reconstruction

=== After the 1979 revolution ===
In its early days, the interim government still used the Lion and Sun flag

Removal of the Pahlavi crown from the war flag of Iran after the 1979 revolution

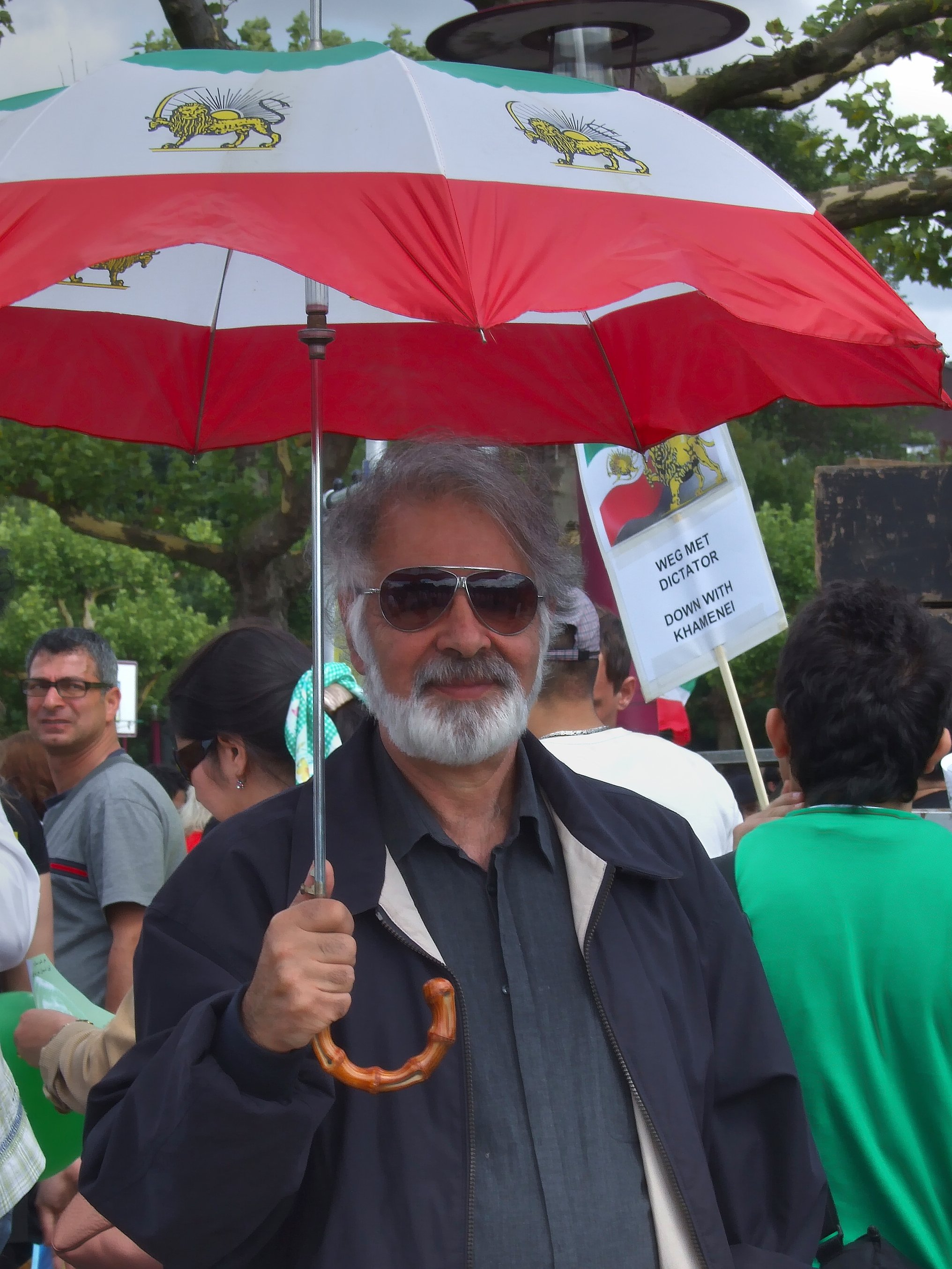
Iranian diaspora's use of the Lion and Sun emblem on Iranian flags

The Lion and Sun remained the official emblem of Iran until after the 1979 Islamic Revolution, when the Lion and Sun symbol was—by decree—removed from public spaces and government organizations, and replaced by the present-day Emblem of the Islamic Republic. For the Islamic revolutionaries, the Lion and Sun symbol represented the "oppressive Westernising monarchy" that had to be replaced, despite the symbol having old Shi'a meanings, with the lion being associated with Ali. In the present day, the lion and sun emblem is still used by segments of the Iranian diaspora as the symbol of opposition to the Islamic Republic. Several opposition groups, including the monarchists and MEK, use the Lion and Sun emblem. In Los Angeles and cities with large Iranian communities, the Lion and Sun emblem is largely used on mugs, Iranian flags, and souvenirs to an extent that far surpasses its display during the years of monarchy in the homeland. During the Mahsa Amini protests in 2022, a number of alternative variant versions of the Lion and Sun were proposed to distinguish the images of new Iran from its historical adaptation of the Lion and Sun.

In recent years, some Islamic Republic officials claim the Lion and Sun as a symbol of Islam in an effort to undermine the ongoing 2025–2026 Iranian protests as the Lion itself represents Imam Ali. However, the Lion and Sun motif has been in display during the Achaemenid Empire. During the protests in Iran as well as the diaspora protests, the Lion and Sun flag was extensively displayed.

== Standardization of the Lion and Sun ==
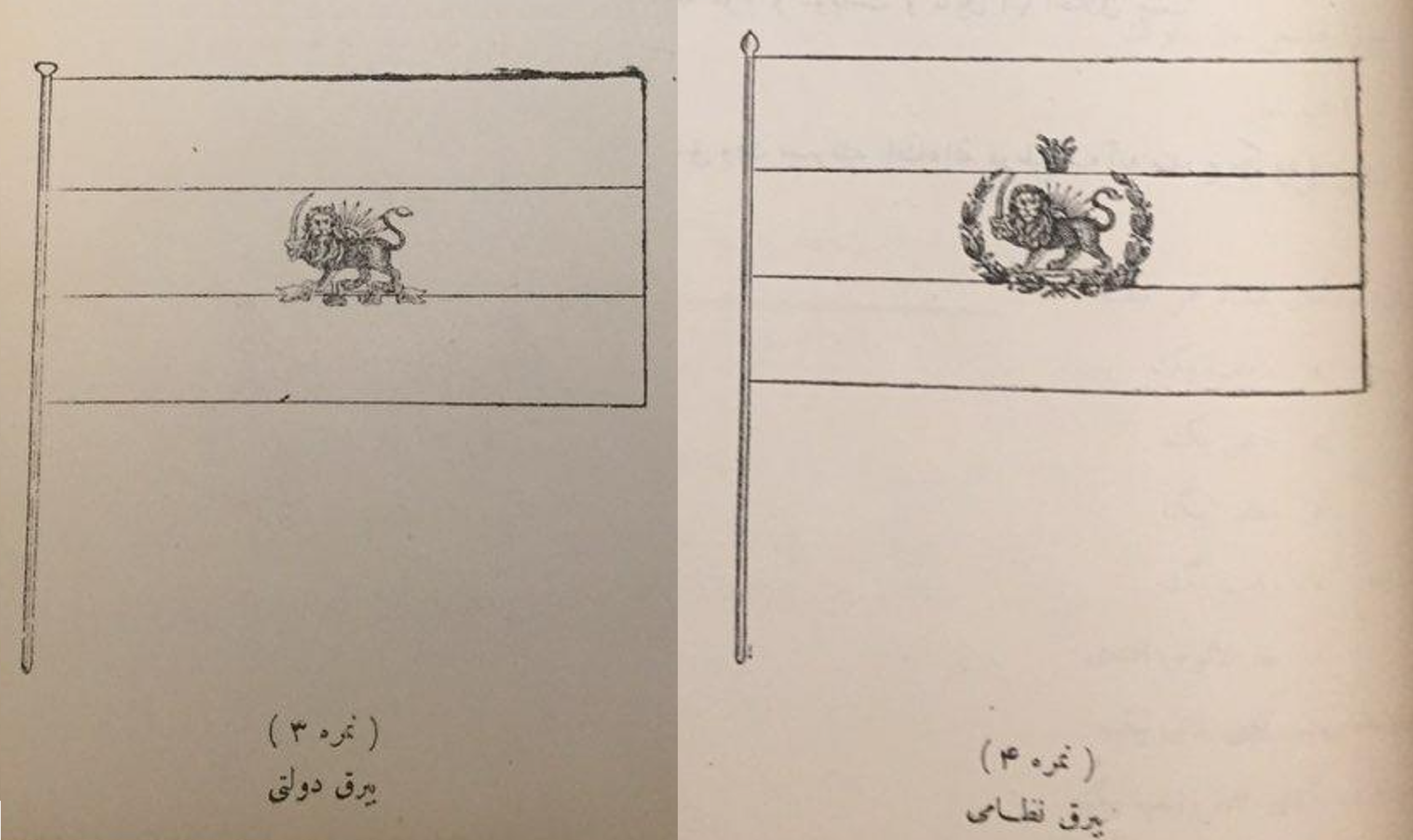
Illustrations from the 8 September 1910 Regulations of the Flags of the Sublime State of Iran, showing the state flag and the war flag as officially defined.

In a regulation dated 8 September 1910, the details of the Lion and Sun emblem—including the manner of drawing the lion’s tail (in the form of an italic S), and the position and size of the lion, sword, and sun—were specified.

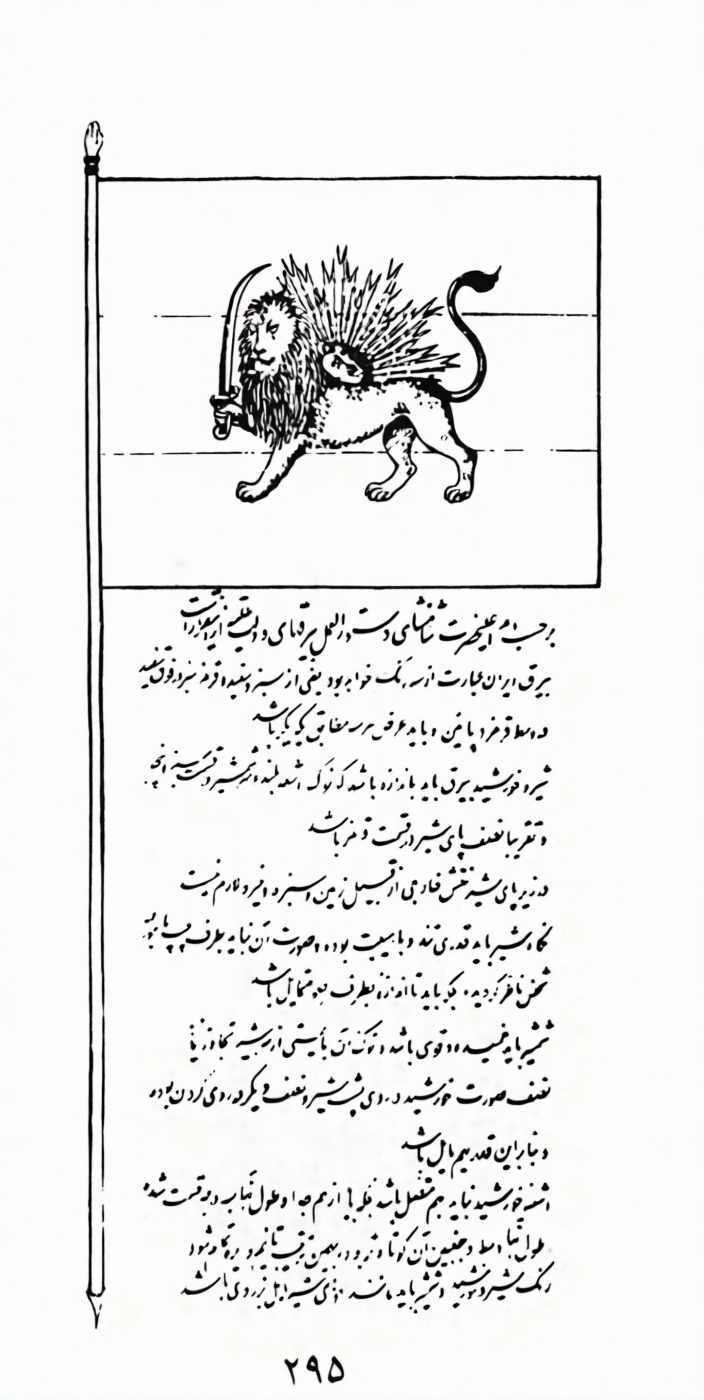
Specification of the Lion and Sun flag from the "Instructions for the Flags of the Sublime State of Iran", an official government manual defining the design, proportions, and graphical details of Iranian state flags.

At the end of the article “The Lion and Sun: The Official Emblem of the State of Iran” by Ebrahim Mokalla, various images of Lion and Sun motifs have been collected. According to the accompanying notes, one of these images appears to belong to the “Instructions for the Flags of the Sublime State” (Dastur al-‘Amal-e Beyraqhā-ye Dowlat-e ‘Aliyyeh), which was prepared to standardize the form of Iran’s flag at the time. The date of this regulation is unknown. According to these instructions, the arrangement of the three colours of the flag was the same as its present configuration; the Lion and Sun were drawn large enough to extend across all three green, white, and red bands; nothing was depicted beneath the lion’s feet; the lion was painted in three-quarter profile; and an oblique human face was drawn within the sun.

In a regulation dated 7 January 1958, the characteristics of the Iranian flag were described as follows: “The Lion and Sun motif, in golden yellow, is placed in the centre of the flag on the white section and is drawn in such a way that the lion’s head faces toward the flagpole, the sword is held vertically in the lion’s hand, and the lion’s feet are directed toward the red band. On one side of the flag, where the lion’s head faces to the viewer’s left, the sword is in the lion’s right hand, the lion’s gaze is inclined to the left, and the lion’s tail is shaped like an italic S with a curve upward. On the other side of the flag, the reverse applies; that is, the sword is in the lion’s left hand, the lion’s gaze is inclined to the right, and the lion’s tail is the mirror image of an italic S. The Lion and Sun on both sides of the flag must correspond exactly. Beneath the lion’s feet, extending from the line of the sword to the point where an imaginary perpendicular line descending from the tip of the lion’s tail would intersect, a straight line proportional to the dimensions of the image is drawn.”

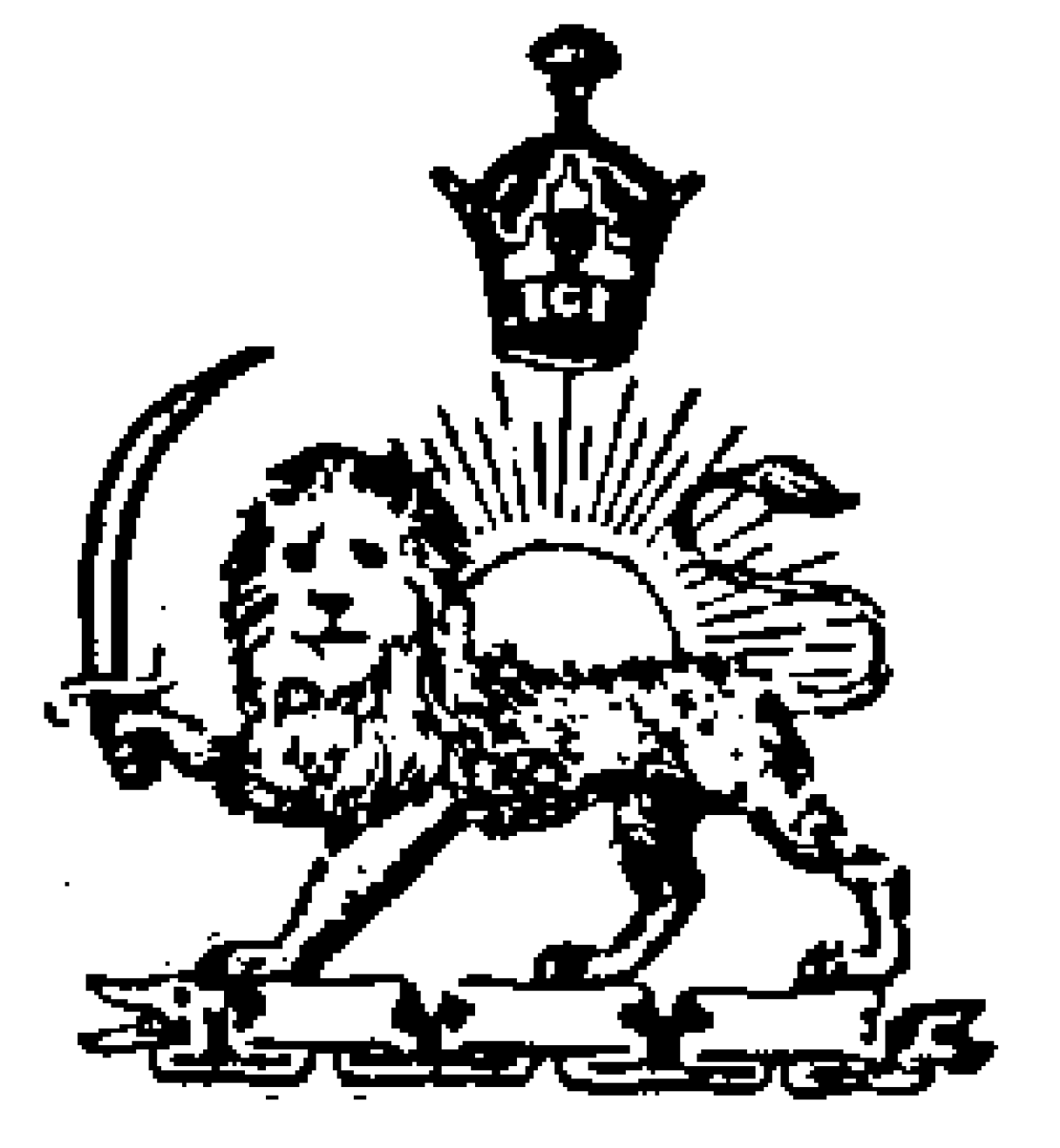
Standardized Lion and Sun emblem of Iran according to the 1959 official flag regulation

In another regulation dated 14 February 1959, the Lion and Sun were placed upon a folded ribbon instead of a horizontal line. According to Yahya Zoka, in 1965 (1344 SH), a commission was formed at the Institute of Standards and Industrial Research of Iran to establish official standards for the Iranian flag. In this standard, the lion’s support was once again described as a line rather than a folded ribbon.

=== Modernist stylized design of the 1970s ===
Stylized Lion and Sun with Pahlavi Crown designed in 1970's

In the 1970s—the final period of constitutional monarchy in Iran—a modernist stylized design was used in official documents, postage stamps, birth certificate (civil registry), the Prime Minister’s aircraft, the entrance of the Prime Minister’s palace, and the national flag of Iran. During the 1970s, the lion's form was modified and redrawn in a neater style, in accordance with modern graphic design conventions. The design was also retained during the early period of the Iranian Revolution, when the Lion and Sun continued to be used on state flags and as the state emblem.

This design continued in use into the early period of the Islamic Republic. On 30 January 1980, with the introduction of the first emblem of the Islamic Republic of Iran, the Lion and Sun were officially abandoned. Visual evidence of this design is presented below.

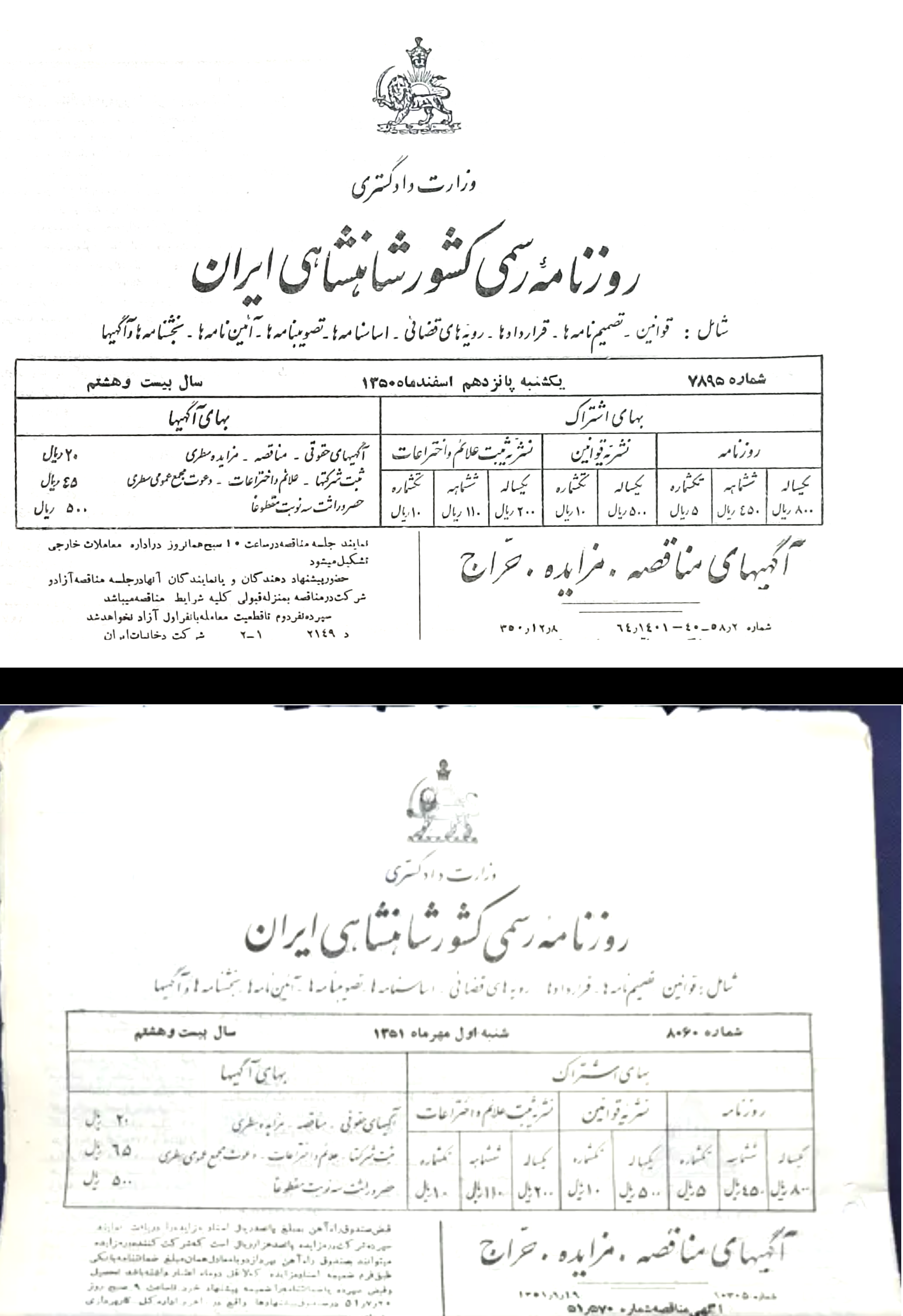
Front pages of the official newspaper of the Imperial State of Iran dated 5 March 1972 and 23 September 1972, showing the transition from the older Lion and Sun emblem to a modernist stylized graphic version in the masthead.

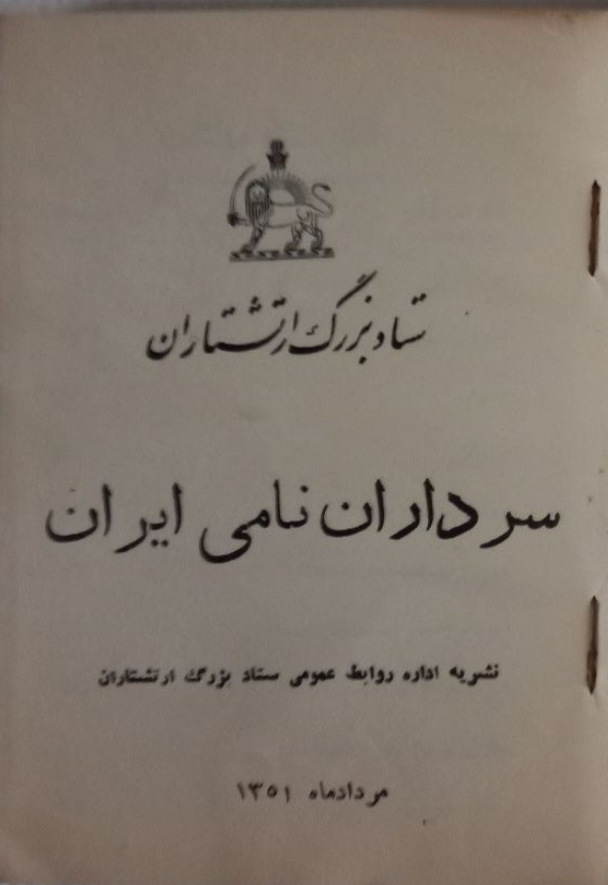
Stylized Lion and Sun emblem on the cover of Sardaran-e Nami-ye Iran, published by Imperial Iranian Armed Forces General Staff, July/August 1972

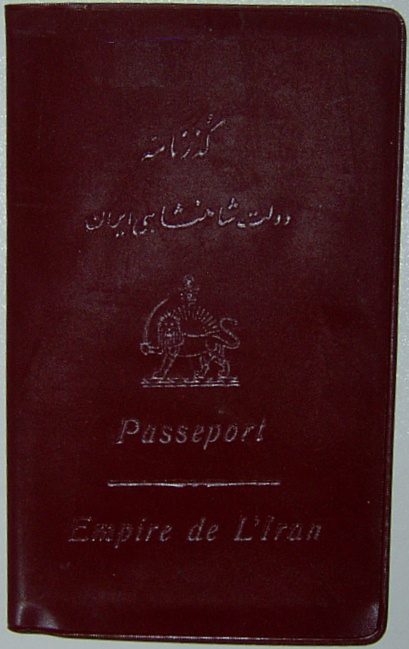
Imperial State of Iran Passport

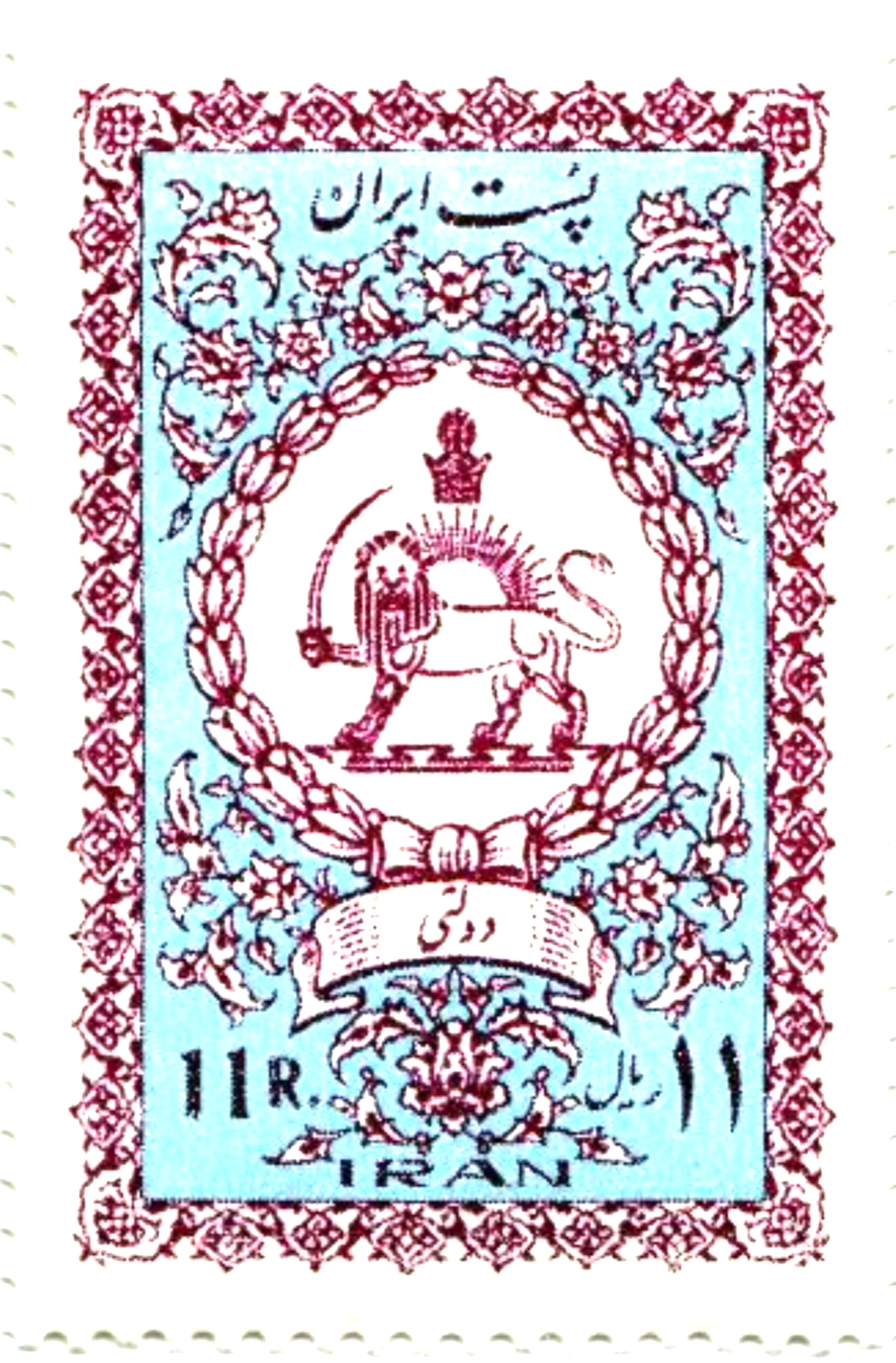
Iranian postage stamp depicting the stylized Lion and Sun emblem, issued by the Iranian Post on 25 February 1974.

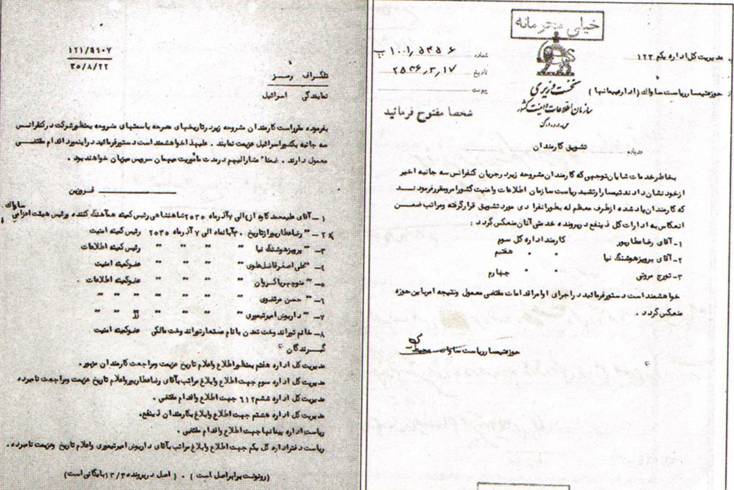
Official document letterhead

Prime Minister Shapur Bakhtiar's interview on 28 January 1979

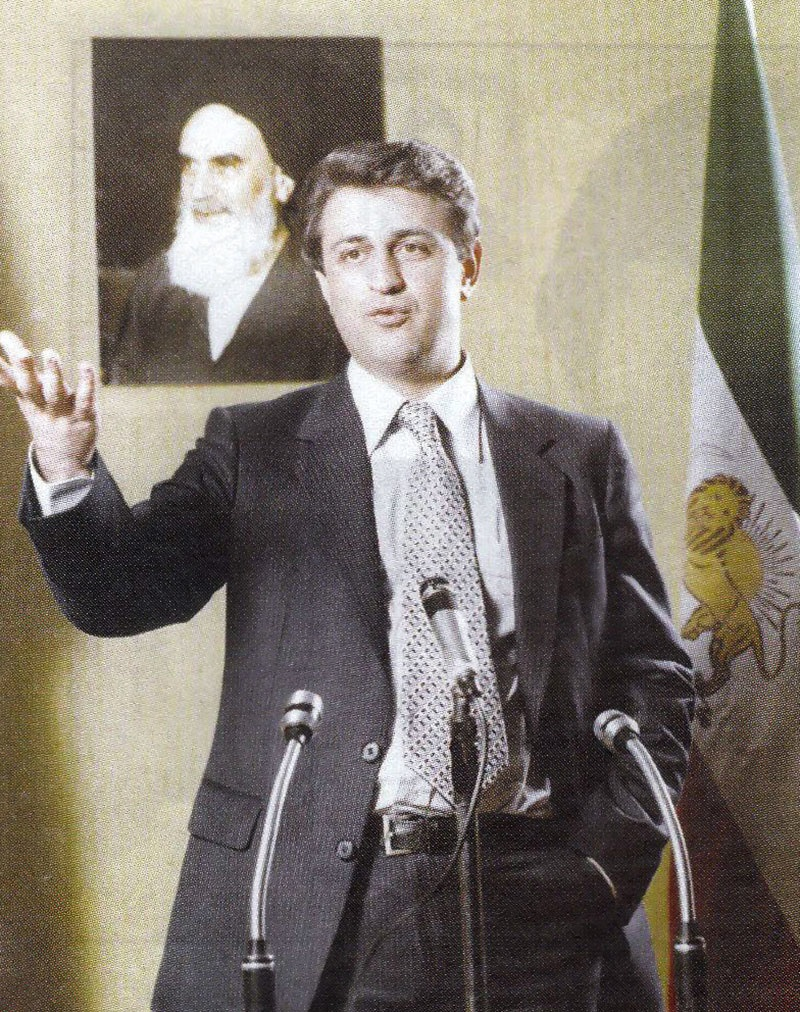
Sadegh Tabatabaei at a press conference with the media regarding the referendum in February or March 1979 (very shortly after the victory of the 1979 Revolution)

== Contemporary use ==
Historically, since the Islamic Revolution, the Lion and Sun flag had been associated with monarchist movements, while some republican and reformist groups preferred the plain tricolour. Over time, the Lion and Sun banner has been adopted more broadly as a symbol of Iranian national identity and opposition to the Islamic Republic rather than exclusively symbolising the pre-1979 monarchy.

Public opinion data suggests the banner's growing recognition and popularity within the country. In a February 2022 survey conducted by GAMAAN in Iran, prior to the outbreak of the Mahsa Amini protests, 46% of respondents chose the Lion and Sun flag as their preferred national flag, compared with 30% who chose the current official flag, and 19% who preferred the plain tricolour without symbols.

=== Use in protests ===
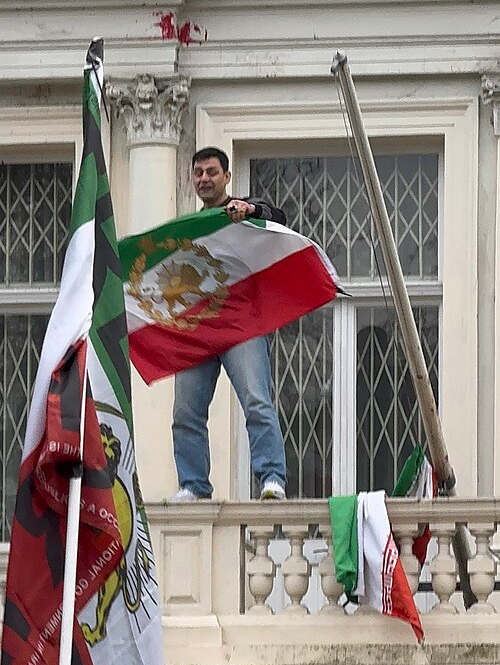
Protestor tears down the Islamic Republic flag at its embassy in London and holds up the Lion and Sun flag, 10 January 2026

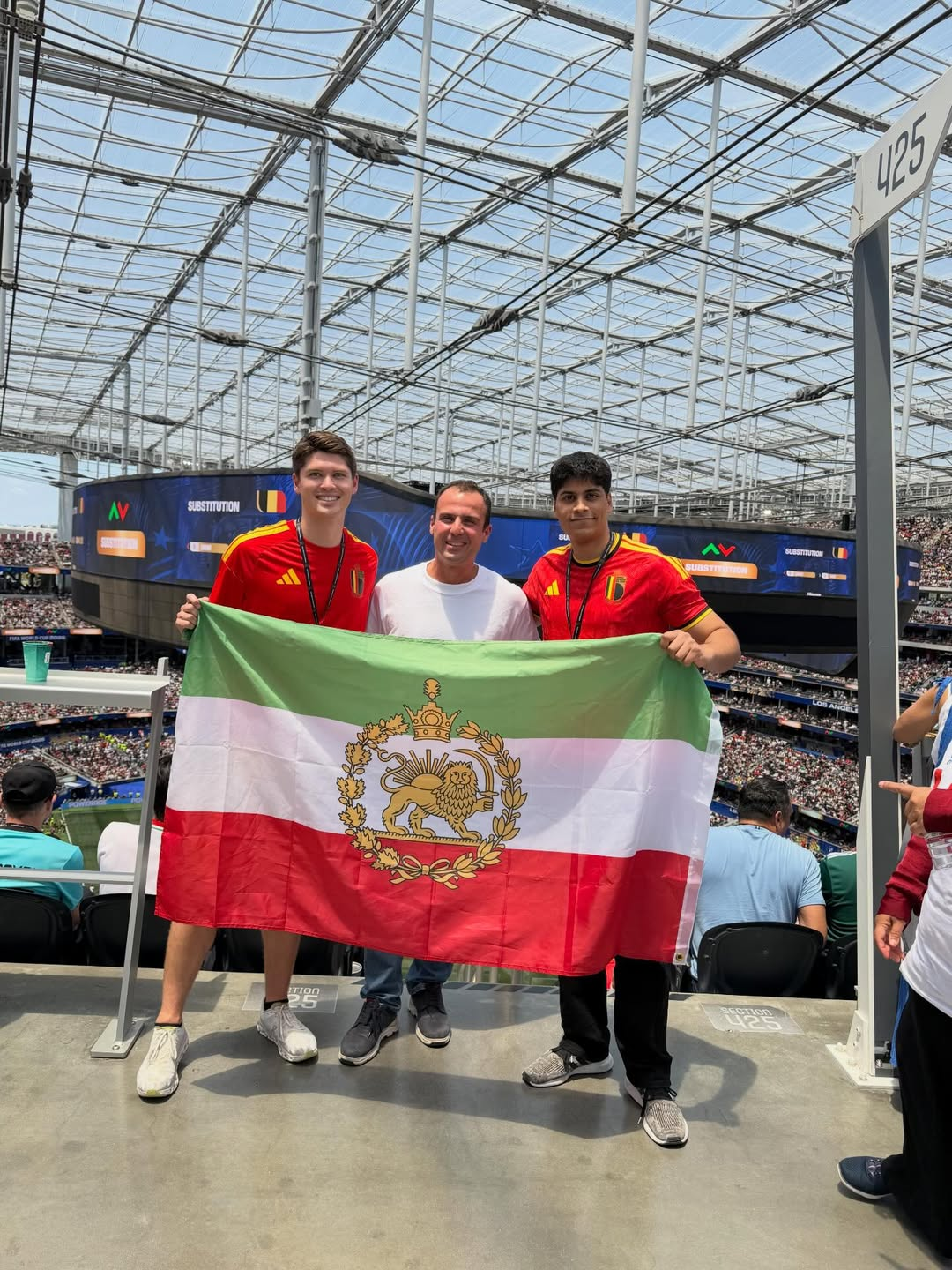
Fans with the Lion and Sun flag prior to the Iran vs. Belgium 2026 FIFA World Cup match at SoFi Stadium in Los Angeles.

The flag is regularly seen at international rallies across North America and Europe, where members of the Iranian diaspora wave it to show solidarity with protest movements in Iran. It has been particularly prominent during demonstrations in major Western cities such as London, Berlin, Paris, Munich, Toronto, and Los Angeles. It has become a core emblem of the anti-regime protest movement.

==== 2025–2026 protests ====
Domestically, the Lion and Sun flag re-emerged during the 2025–2026 protests in Iran, with demonstrators publicly waving the flag and, in some cases, tearing down and burning official Islamic Republic flags.

In solidarity with the uprising in Iran, protesters tore down the Islamic flag at the Islamic Republic's embassy in London and replaced it with the Lion and Sun flag. On 14 February 2026, a massive 50-metre (160 ft) version of the flag was raised in Munich during the "Global Day of Action" diaspora protests. The Lion and Sun flag is used as a symbol of secularism and freedom, in defiance of theocratic rule. On 19 May 2026, it was reported that FIFA would again ban the Iranian flag from 2026 FIFA World Cup stadiums, similar to previous World Cups; however, several fans reportedly brought in Lion and Sun flags in defiance. On 9 January 2026, Twitter changed the Twemoji library's icon for the Iran flag emoji from the Islamic Republic flag to a modern reconstruction of the Lion and Sun flag.

== Gallery ==
Alternate designs

Modern design with the full wreath and crown

Modern design with the crown and without the platform

Traditional digital design with the crowned wreath

Traditional digital design

Traditional variant of the Lion and Sun flag used prior to the revolution

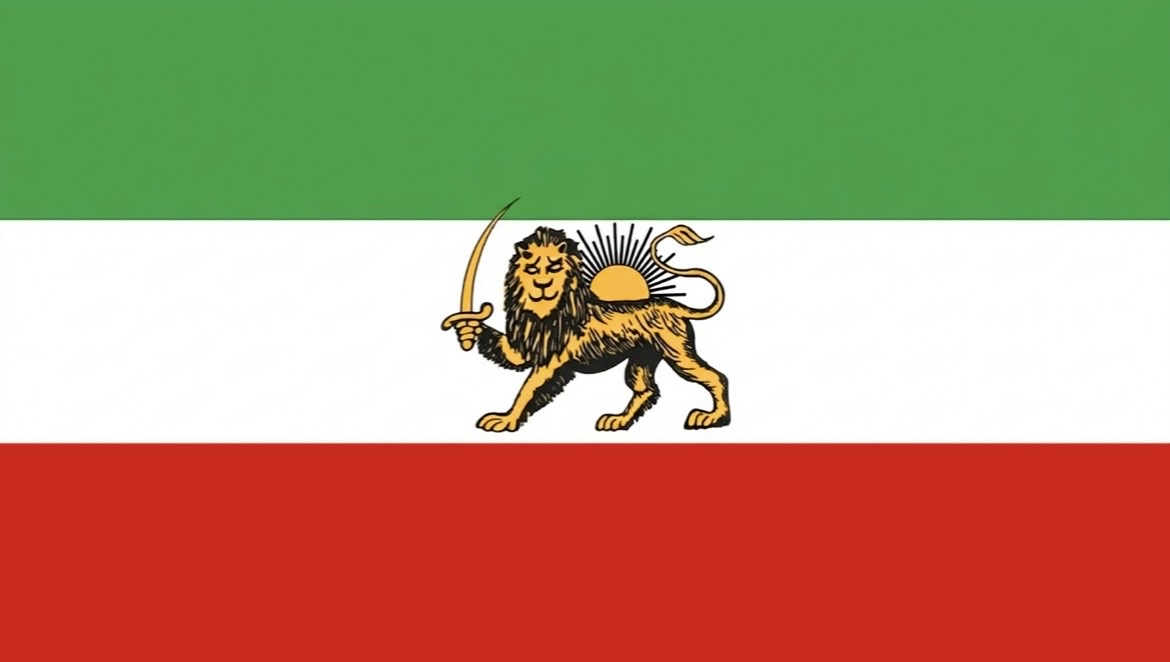
Variant that has also been widely used in protests

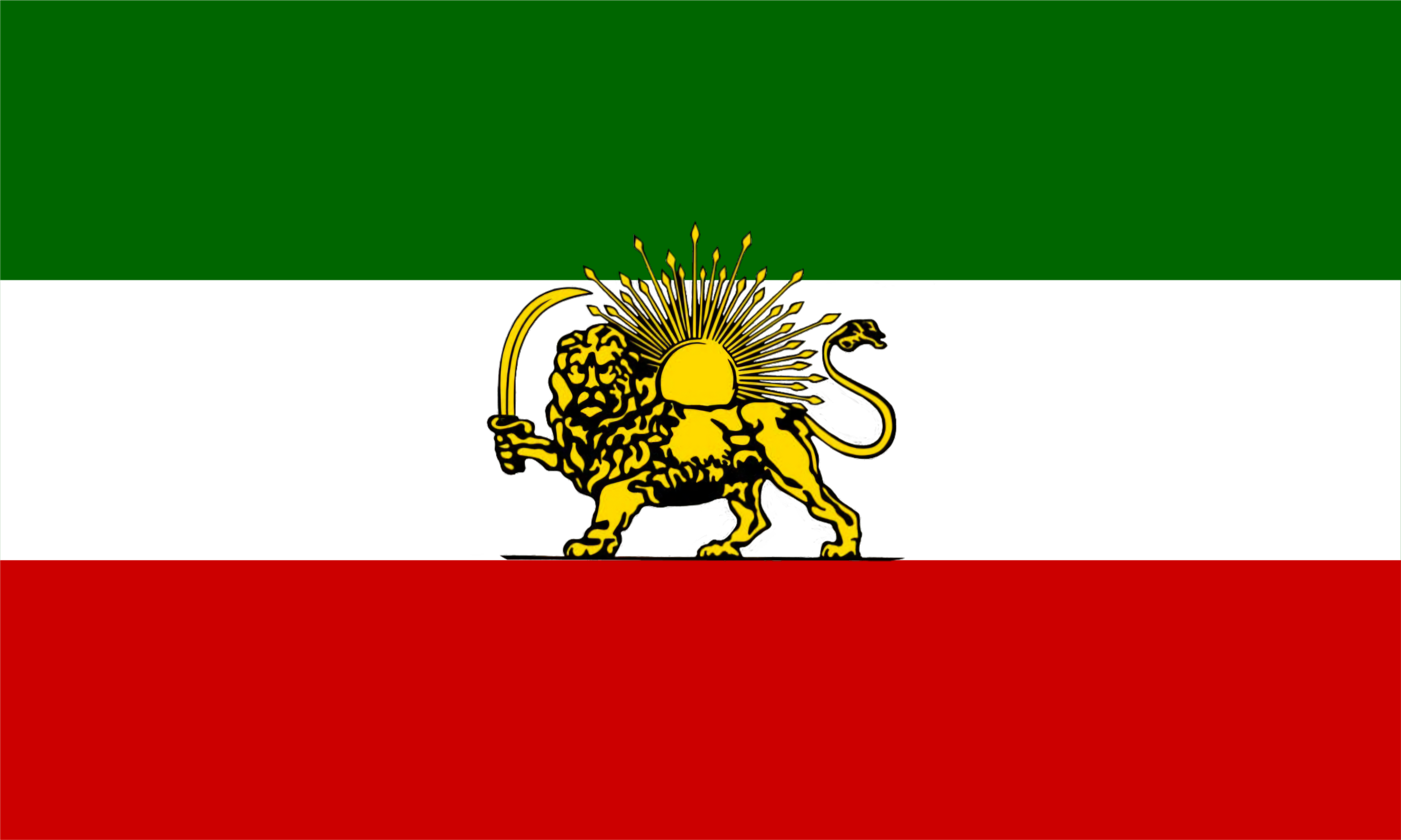
Another variant used by numerous protesters; this design is the one used in the 50-metre Munich flag

Flag emoji used on Twitter since 2026.
Flag being waved in protests

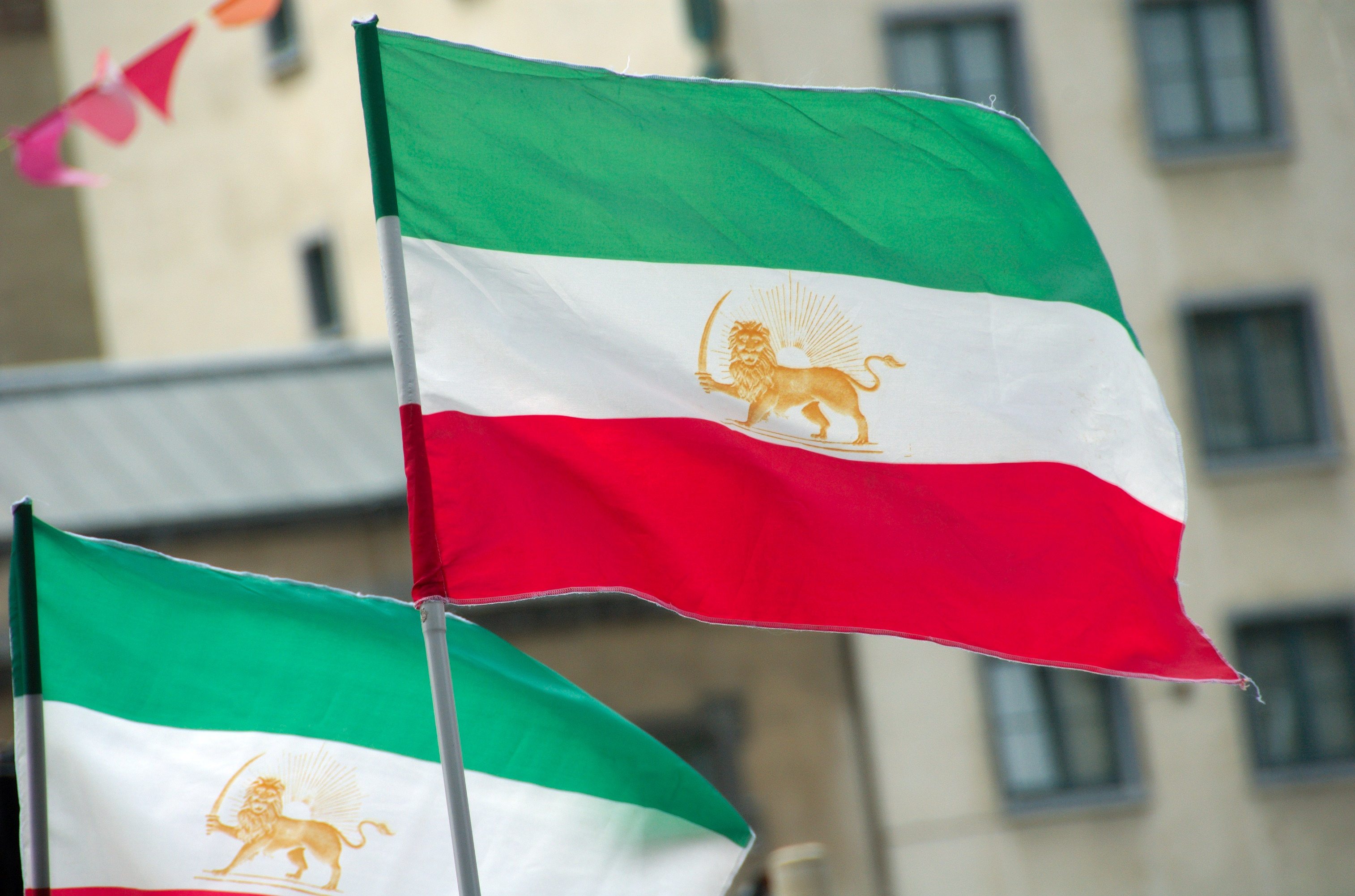
Protest for the regularisation of sans papiers immigrants in Brussels on 17 June 2007

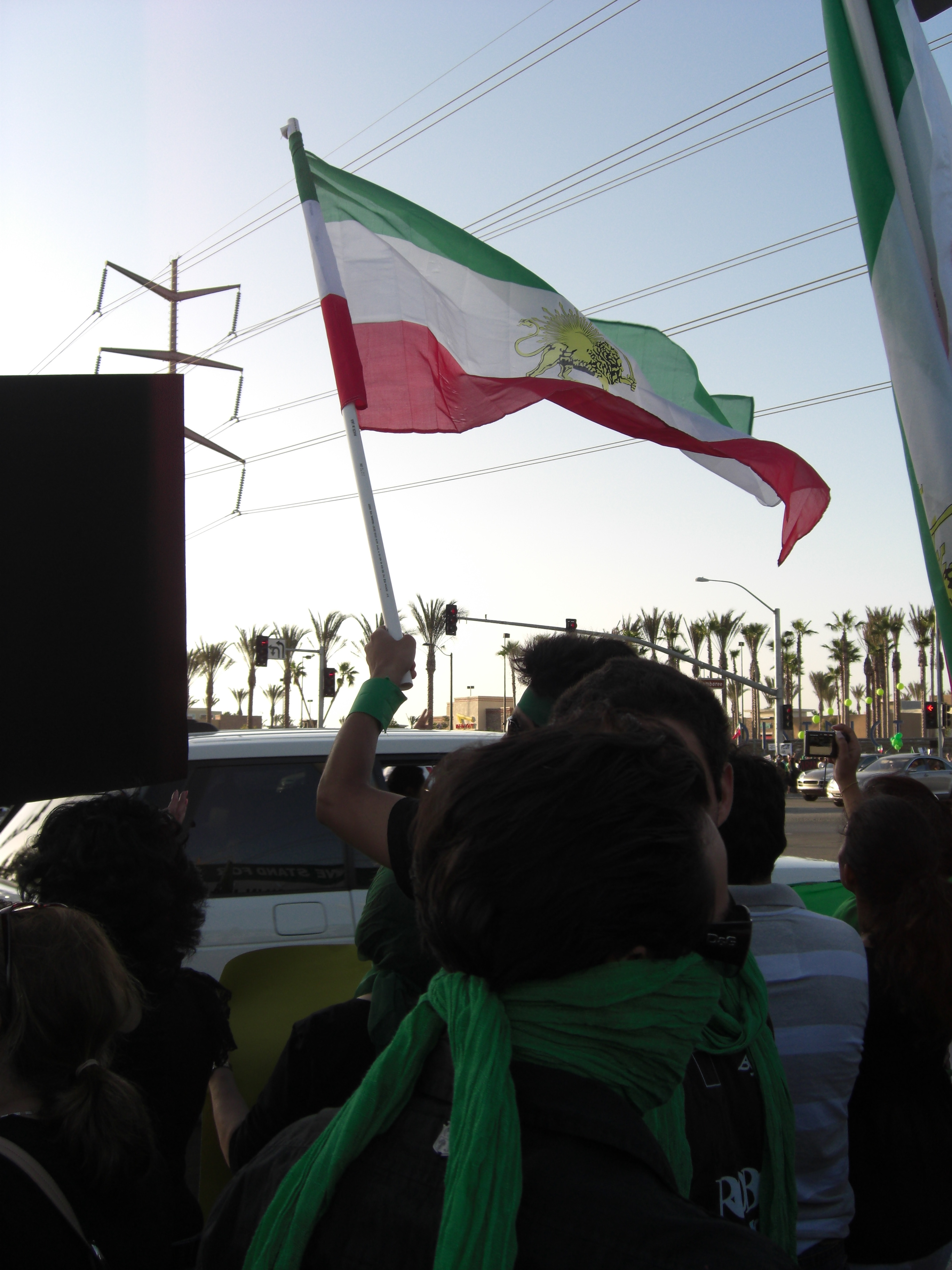
Green Movement solidarity protest in Irvine, California on 21 June 2009

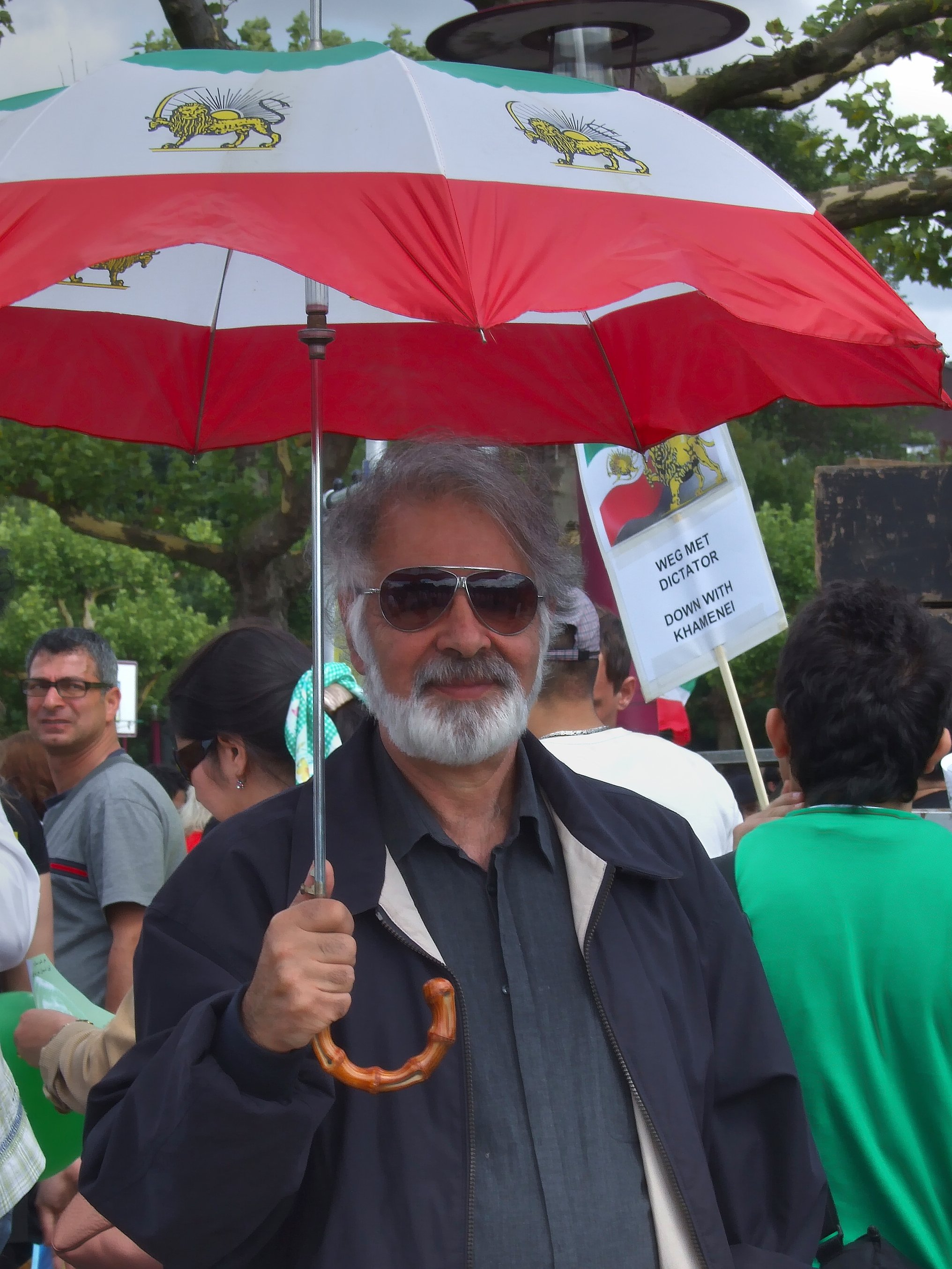
Diaspora member holding a Lion and Sun flag umbrella in Amsterdam, 25 July 2009

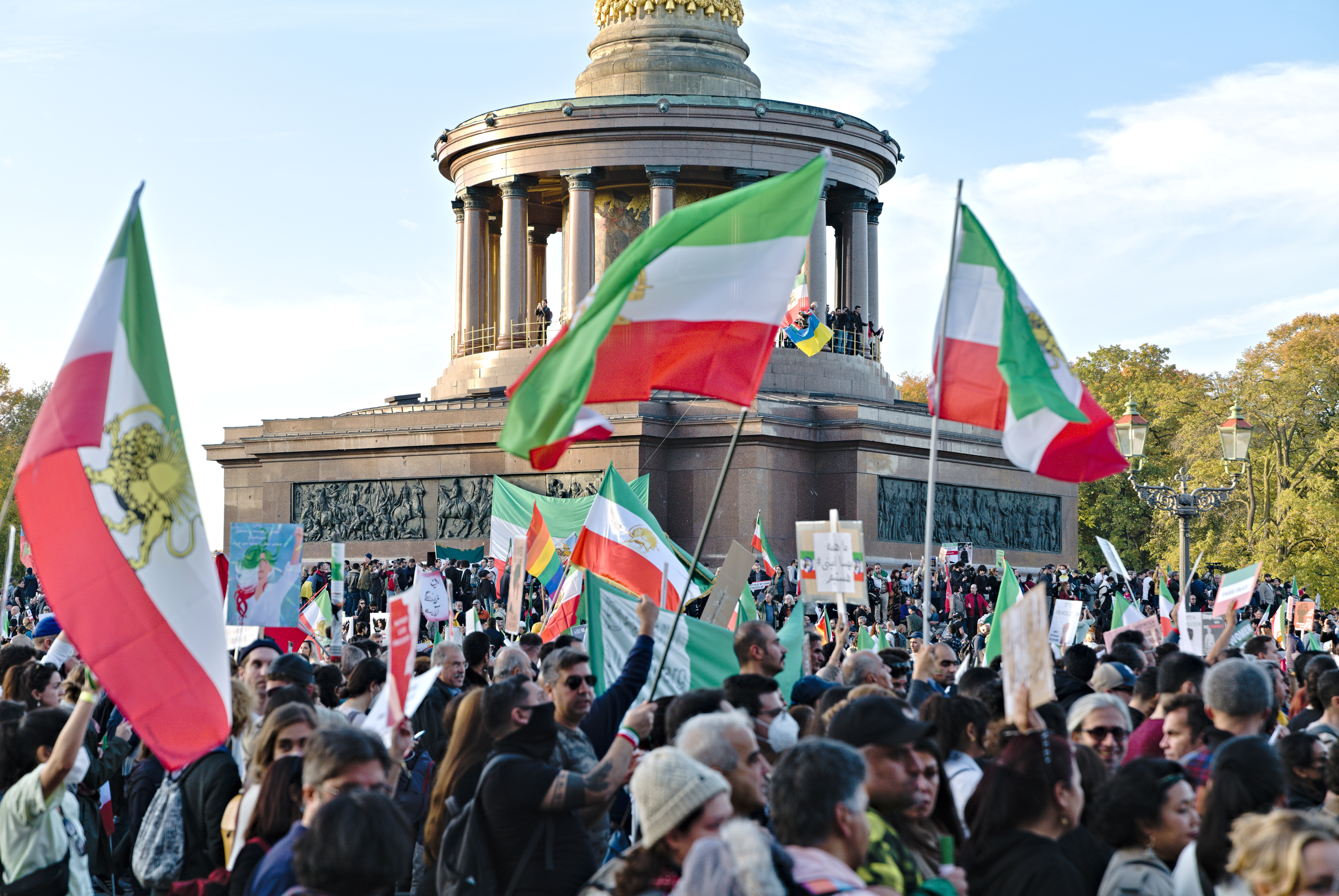
"Woman, Life, Freedom" solidarity protest at the Tiergarten in Berlin, 22 October 2022

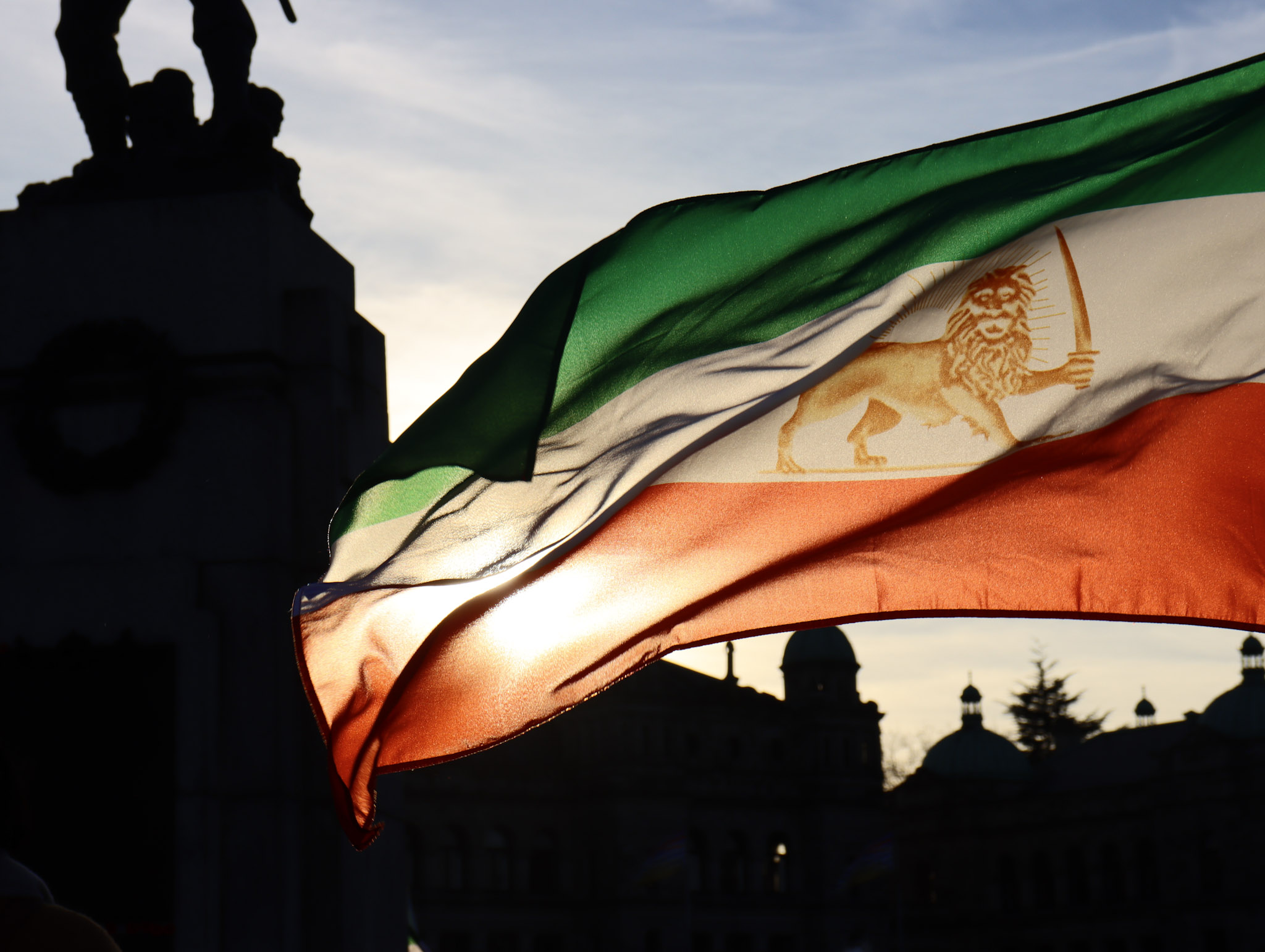
Flag flown at a Woman Life Freedom solidarity protest in Victoria, BC on 19 November 2022

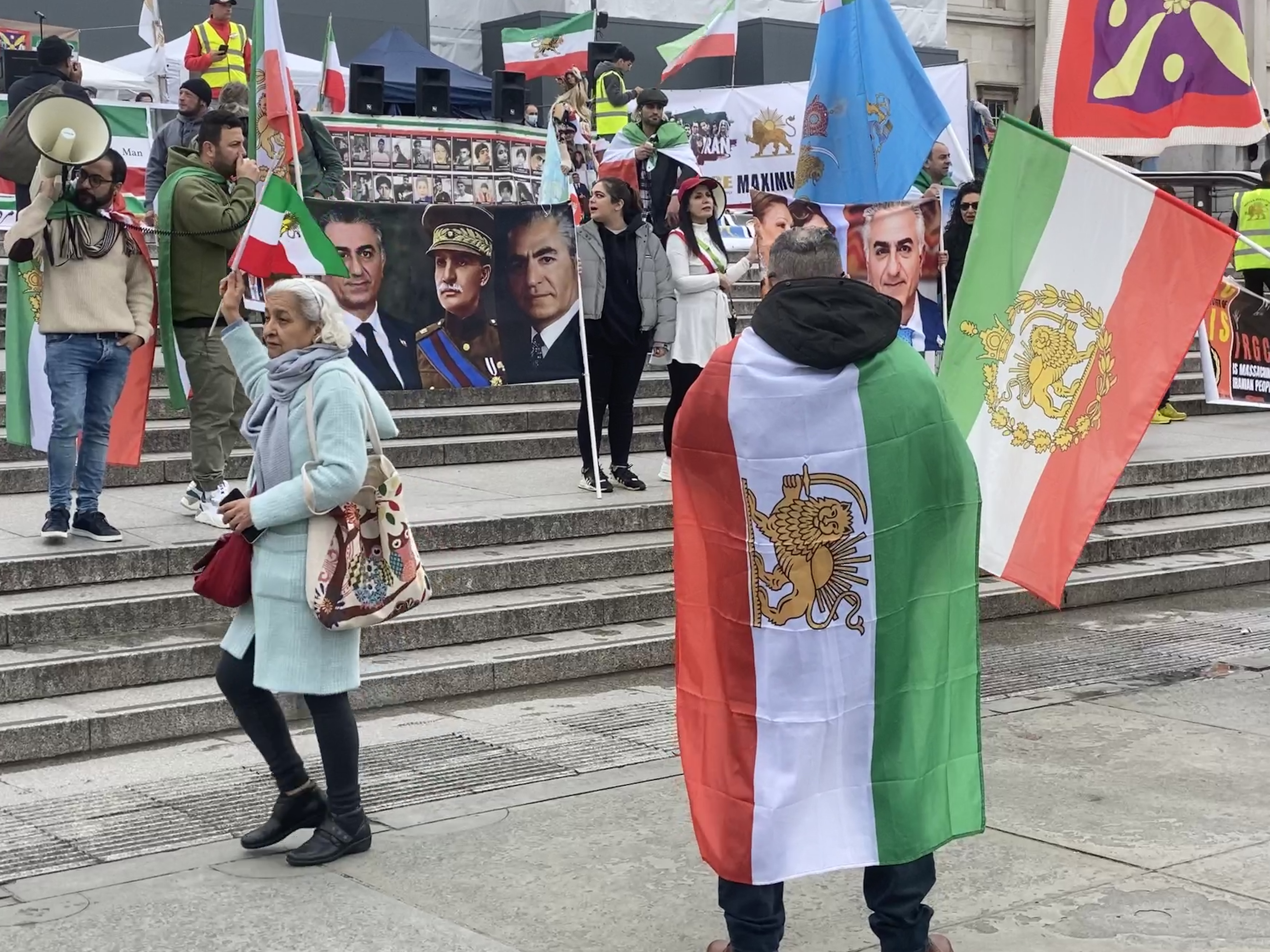
Various flags shown during a protest at Trafalgar Square, London on 1 April 2023

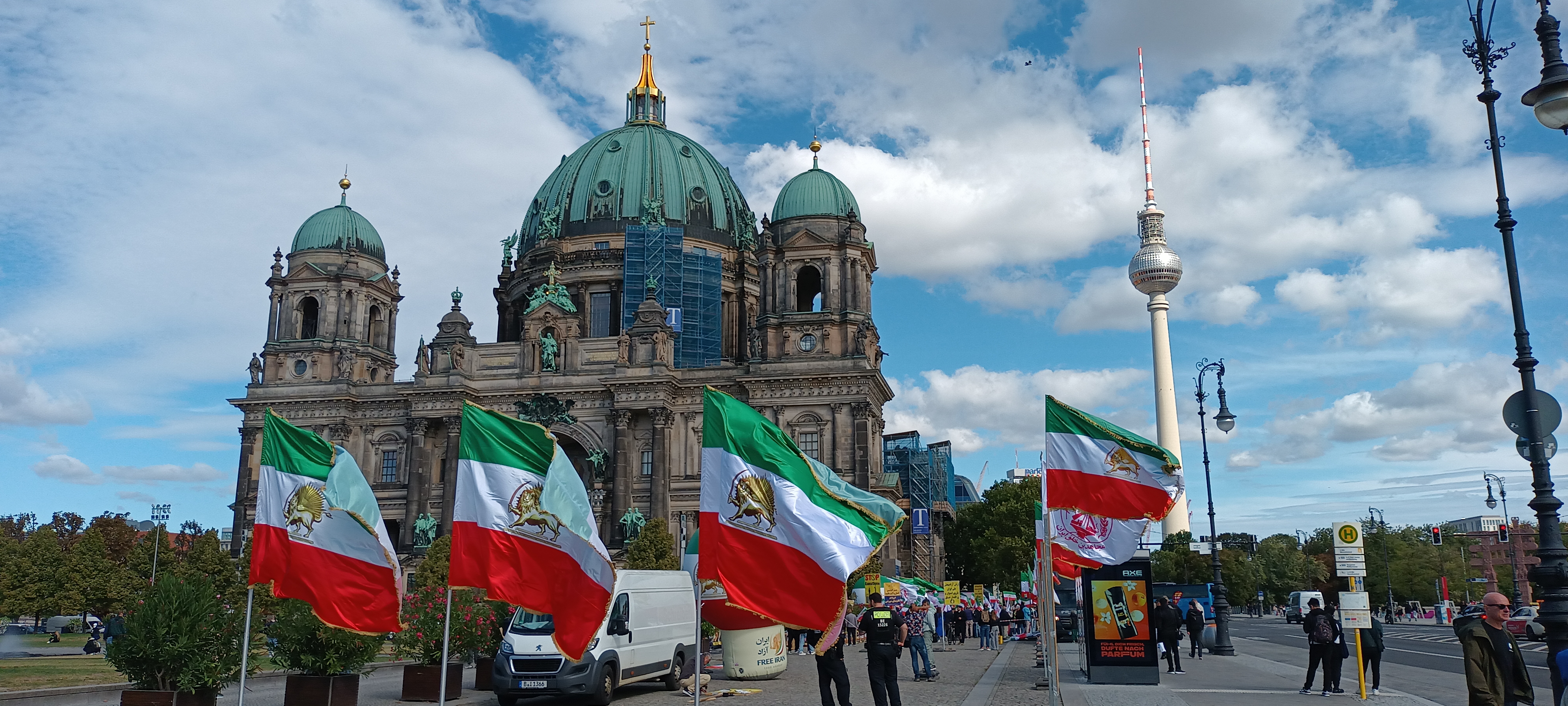
Another flag-waving demonstration in Berlin on 11 September 2024

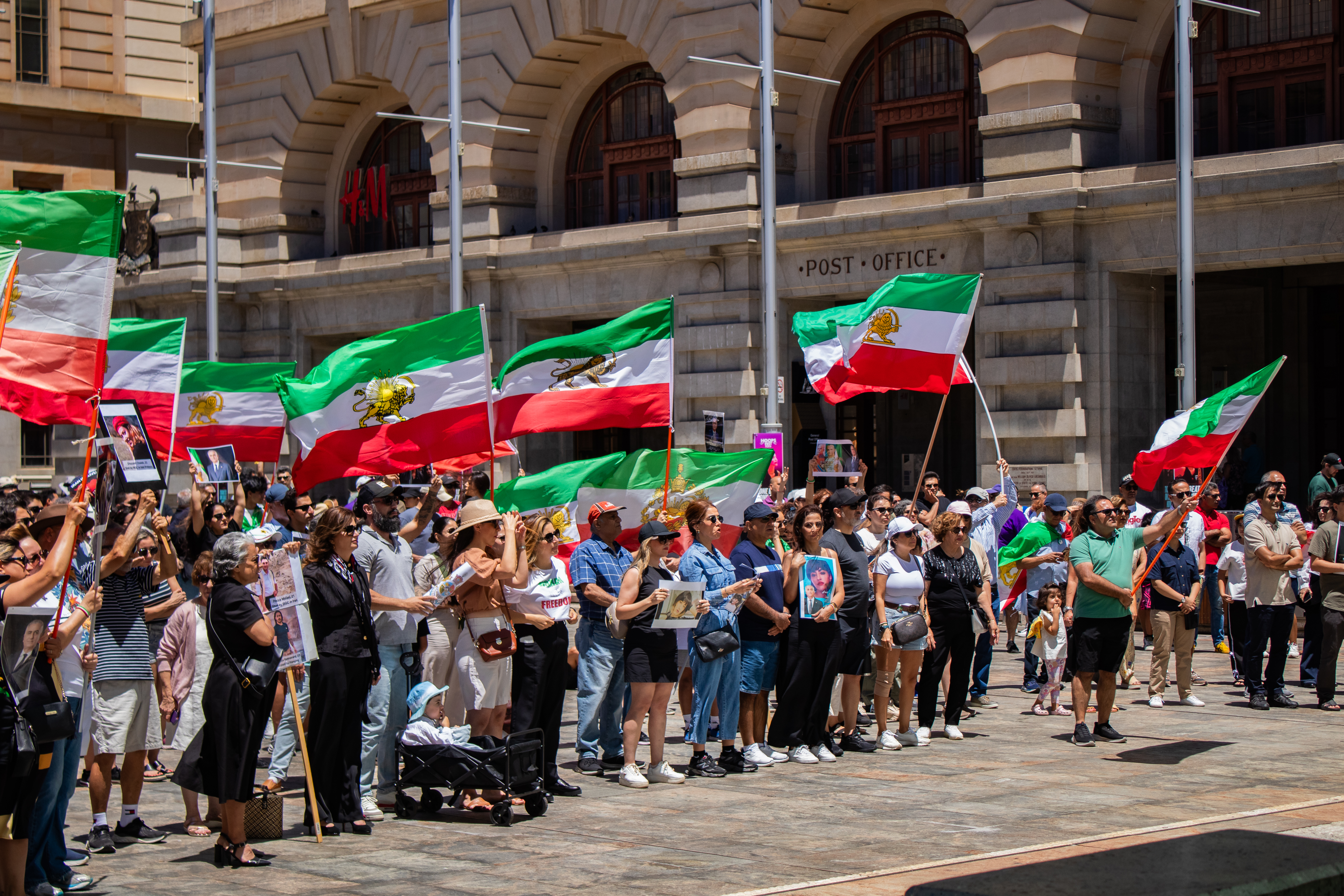
Solidarity rally against the Islamic regime in Perth, Australia on 10 January 2026

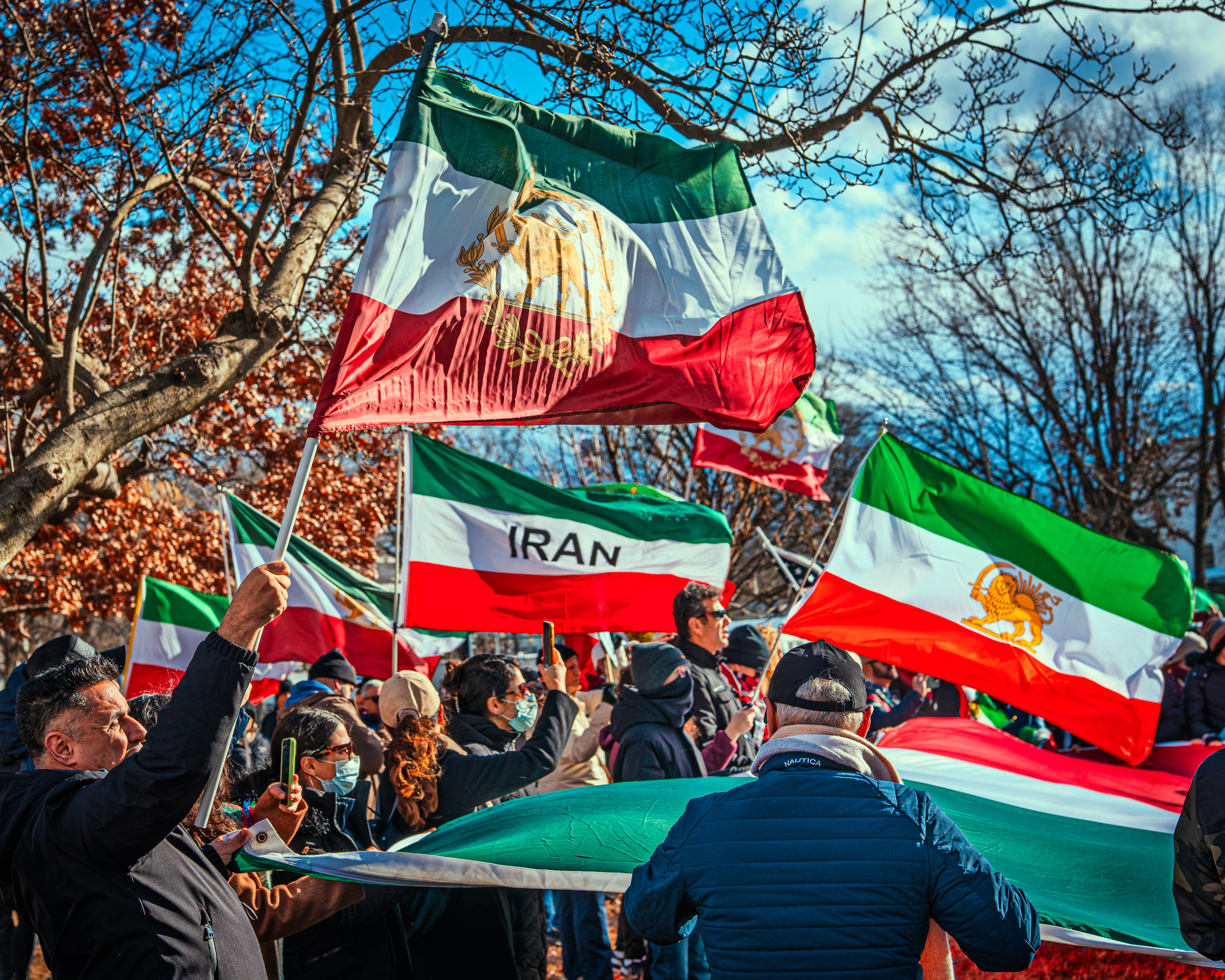
Rally held in Lafayette Square, Washington, D.C. on 11 January 2026

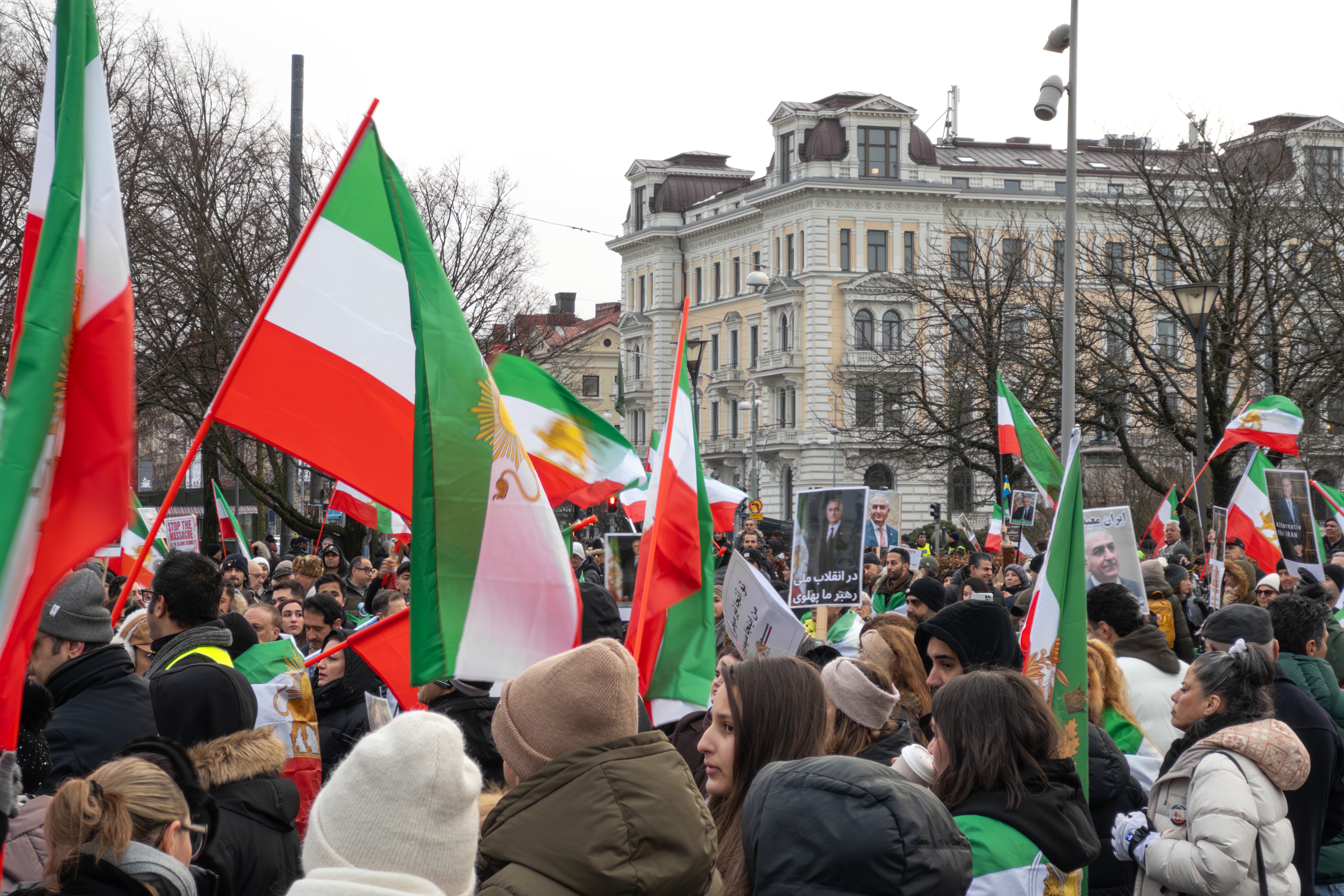
Anti-Islamic Republic protest in Gothenburg, Sweden, 17 January 2026

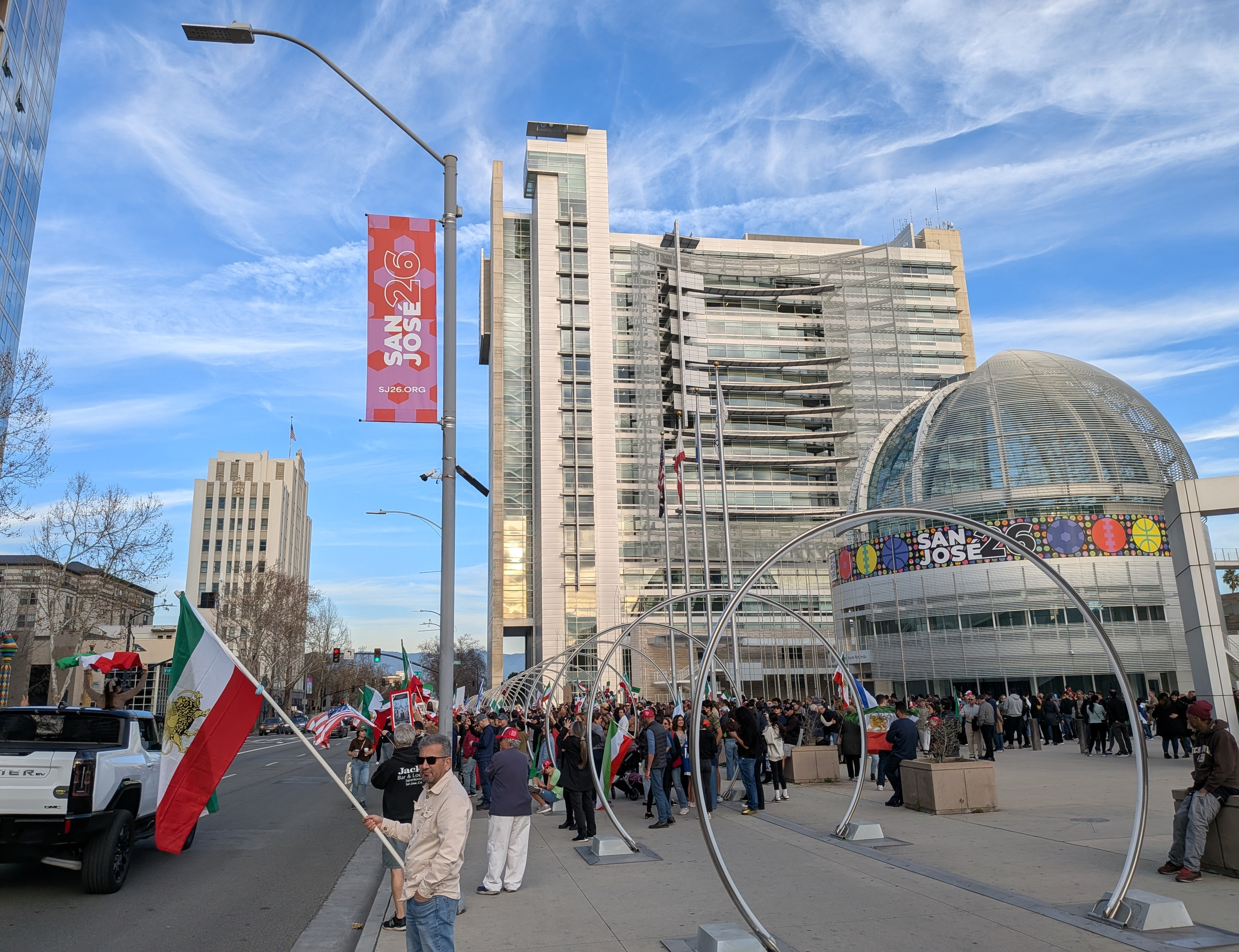
Solidarity rally against the Islamic regime in San José, 17 January 2026

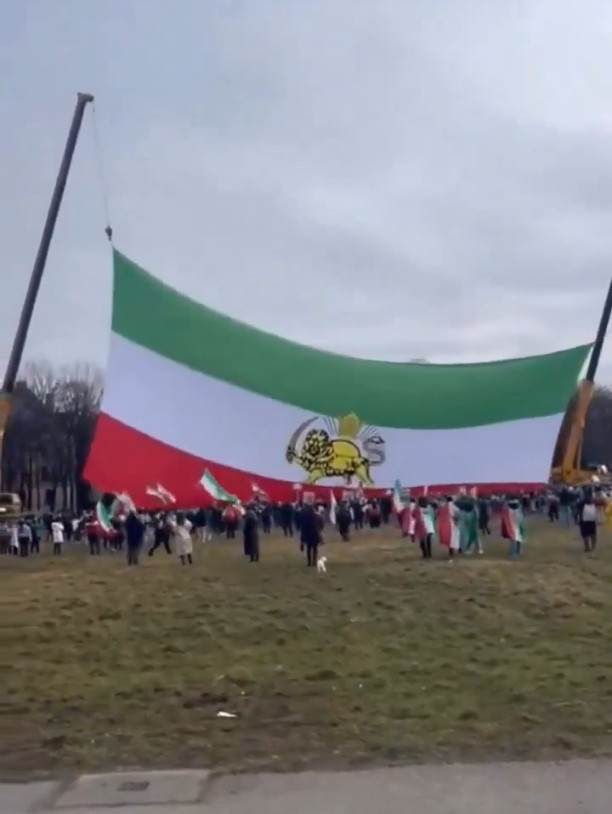
Lion and Sun flag being raised in Munich as part of the Global day of action for the Iranian people, organised by Reza Pahlavi on 14 February 2026.
Flag being used by public figures/in public events

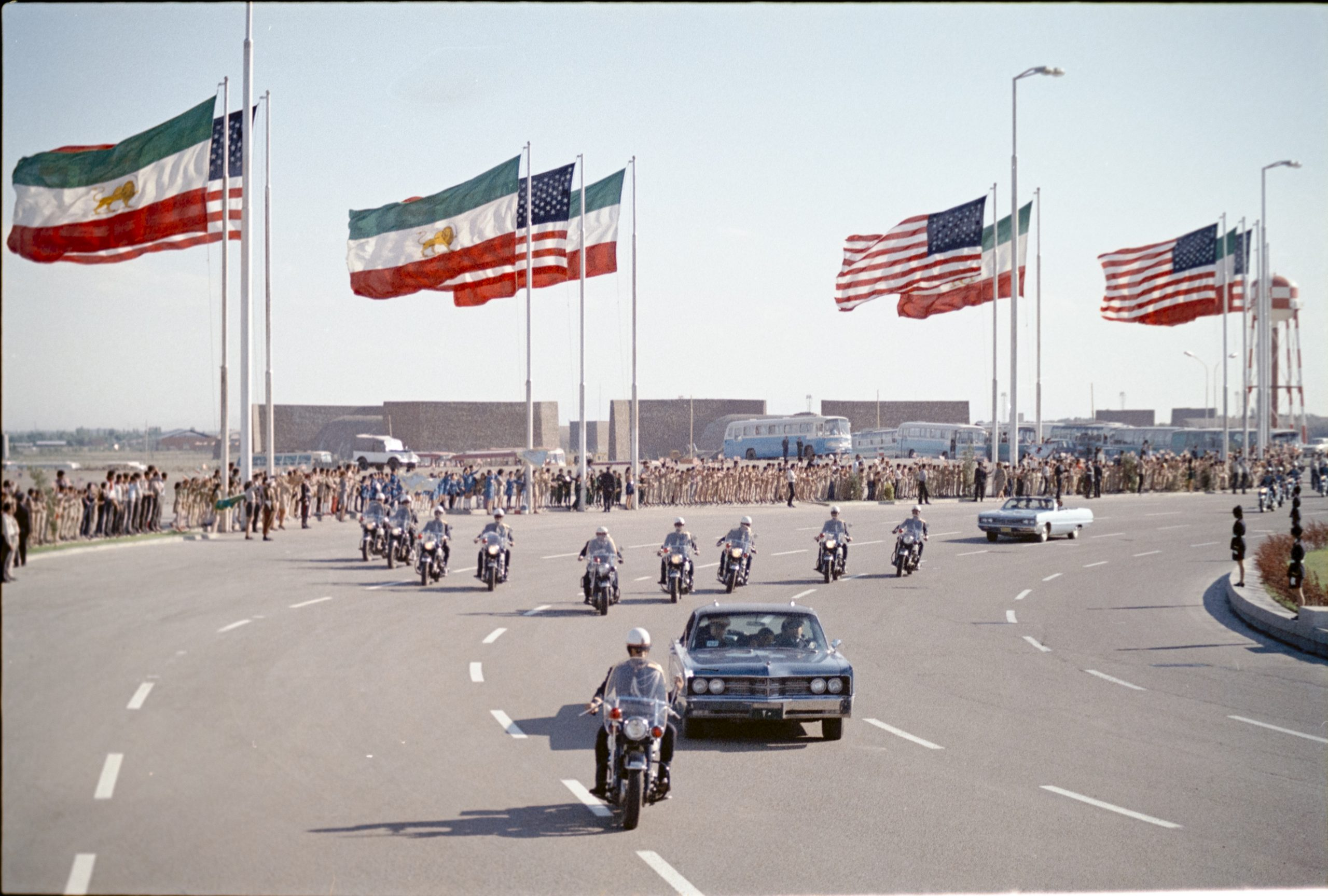
Motorcade carrying U.S. President Richard Nixon during his trip to Tehran on 30 May 1972, with large Iranian and U.S. flags in the background

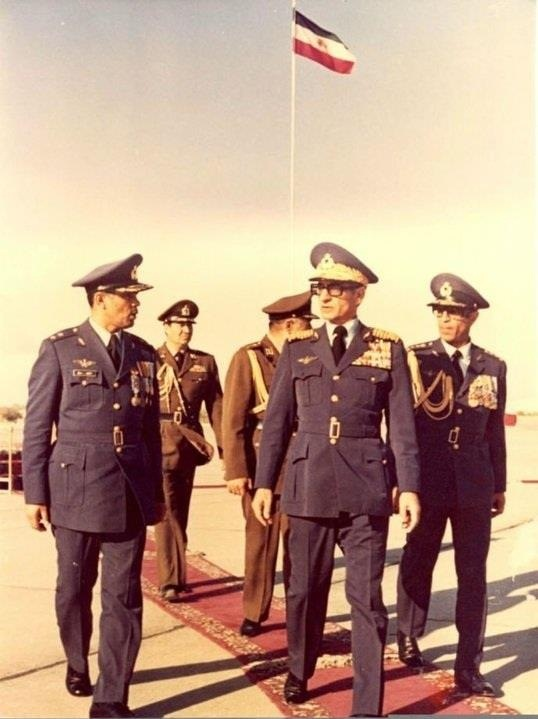
Mohammad Reza Pahlavi speaking with Iranian military officials, flag visible in background, 1972

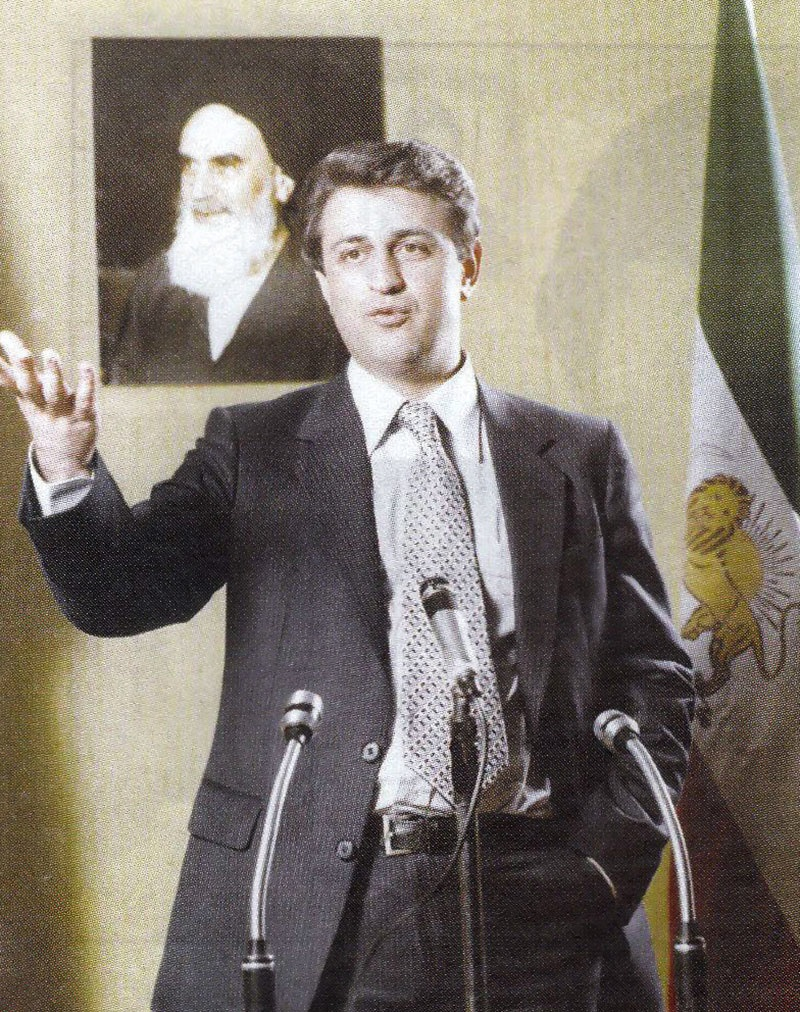
Khomeini spokesperson Sadegh Tabatabaei at a post-revolution press conference with the 1972 version of the flag behind him, March 1979

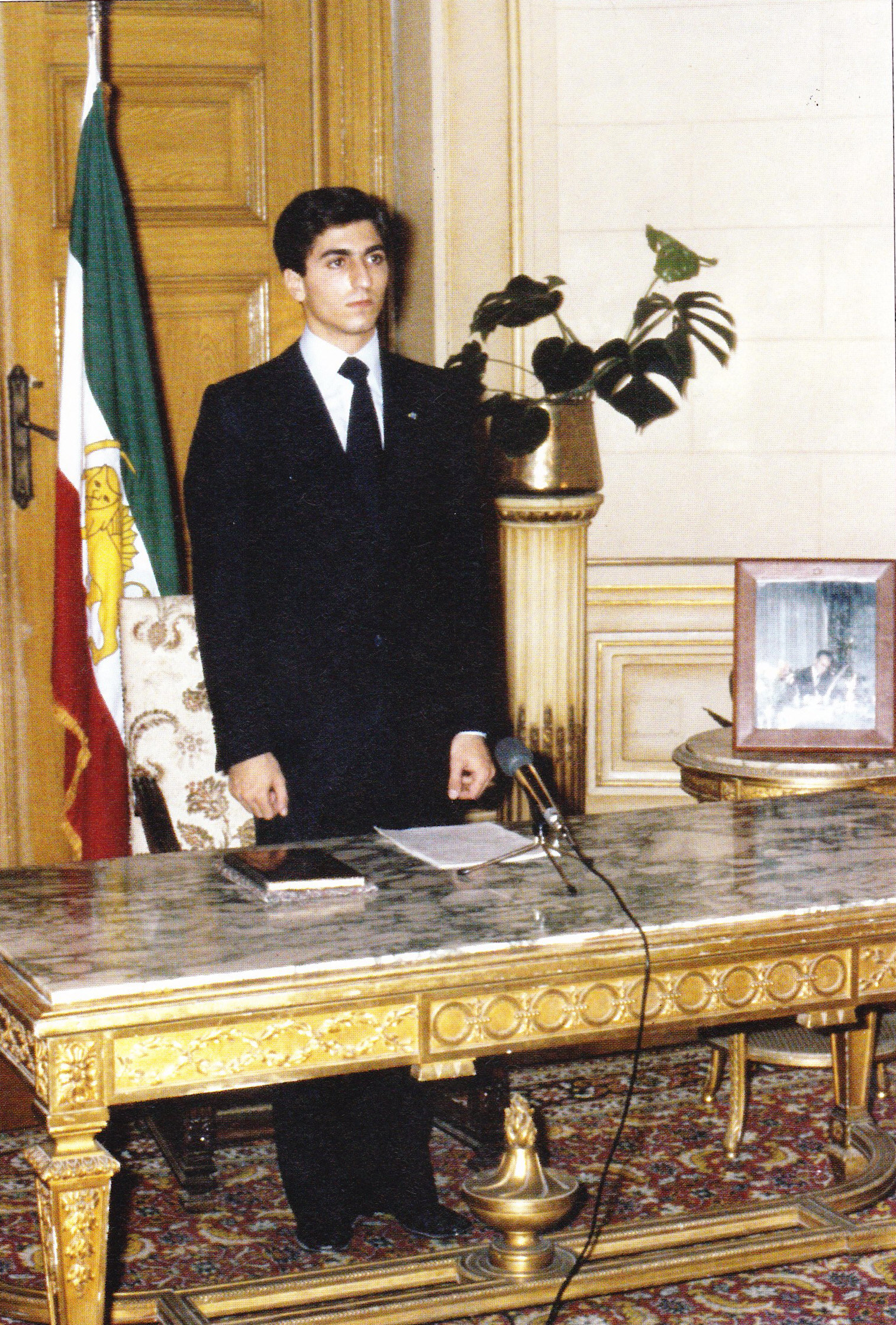
Crown Prince Reza Pahlavi being sworn in with the flag behind him at the Koubbeh Palace in Cairo, 31 October 1980

== See also ==
- Flag of Iran
- Lion and Sun
- Lion and Sun Flag Anthem
- List of Iranian flags
- Derafsh
- Derafsh Shahdad
- Derafsh Shahbaz
- Derafsh Kaviani

=== Other opposition flags ===
- Flag of Ba'athist Iraq, former flag of Iraq used by Iraqi Sunni Arab opposition
- White-red-white flag, former flag of Belarus and Belarusian opposition symbol
- White-blue-white flag, Russian anti-war and opposition symbol
- Flag of South Vietnam, often used by Vietnamese diaspora
- Flag of Venezuela pre-2006, used by the Venezuelan opposition and diaspora
- Flag of the Second Spanish Republic, former flag of Spain and Spanish republican symbol
