= 2018 attack on the High National Elections Commission in Tripoli, Libya =

- Part of Libyan civil war (2014–2020)
- Location: Tripoli, Libya
- Date: 2 May 2018 (UTC+2)
- Attack type: Shooting, arson, suicide bombings
- Deaths: 16
- Injuries: 20
- Perpetrator: Islamic State of Iraq and the Levant: Wilayat Tarabulus

On May 2, 2018, suicide bombers attacked the High National Elections Commission (HNEC) in Tripoli, Libya, killing at least 16 people, injuring 20 and setting fire to the building.

== Responsibility ==
The Islamic State's Tripoli Province claimed responsibility for the attack and declared that it came in response to the recent speech of the group's spokesman to hit election centers and activists.
