= Shafiabad Castle =

Castle in Kerman province, Iran

Shafiabad castle
- قلعه شفیع‌آباد
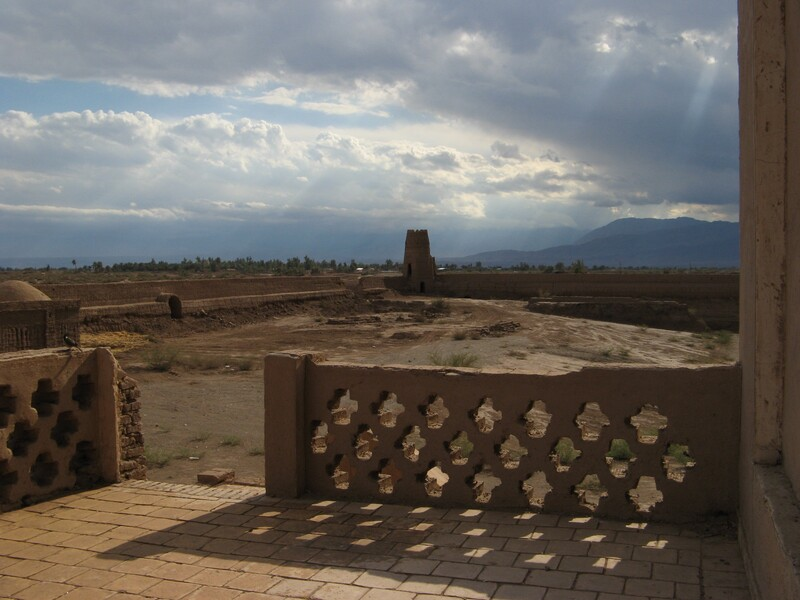

General information
- Type: Castle
- Location: Shafiabad, Iran

Shafiabad castle (Persian: قلعه شفیع‌آباد) is a Qajar era castle located in Shafiabad, Kerman province.

== Gallery ==
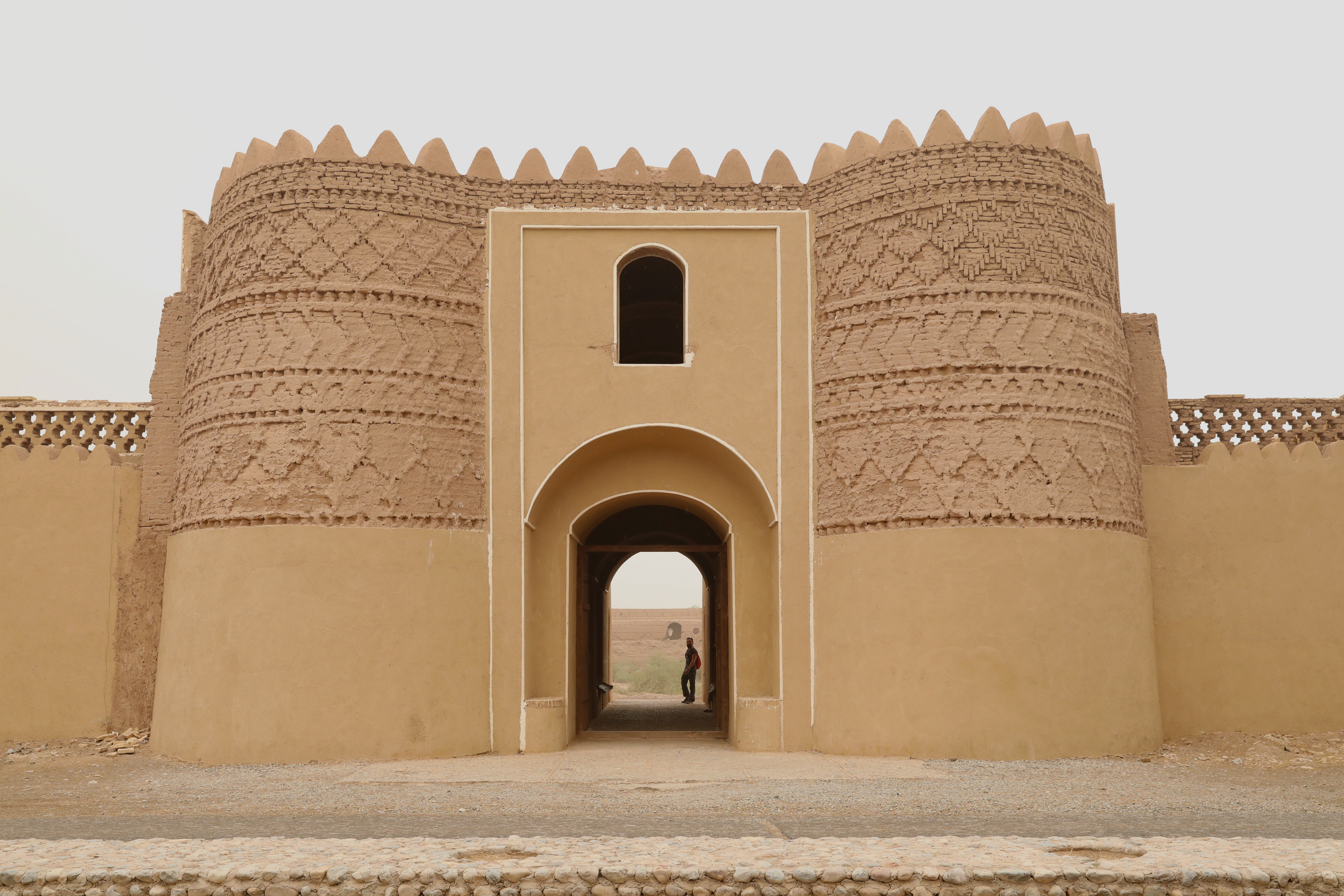

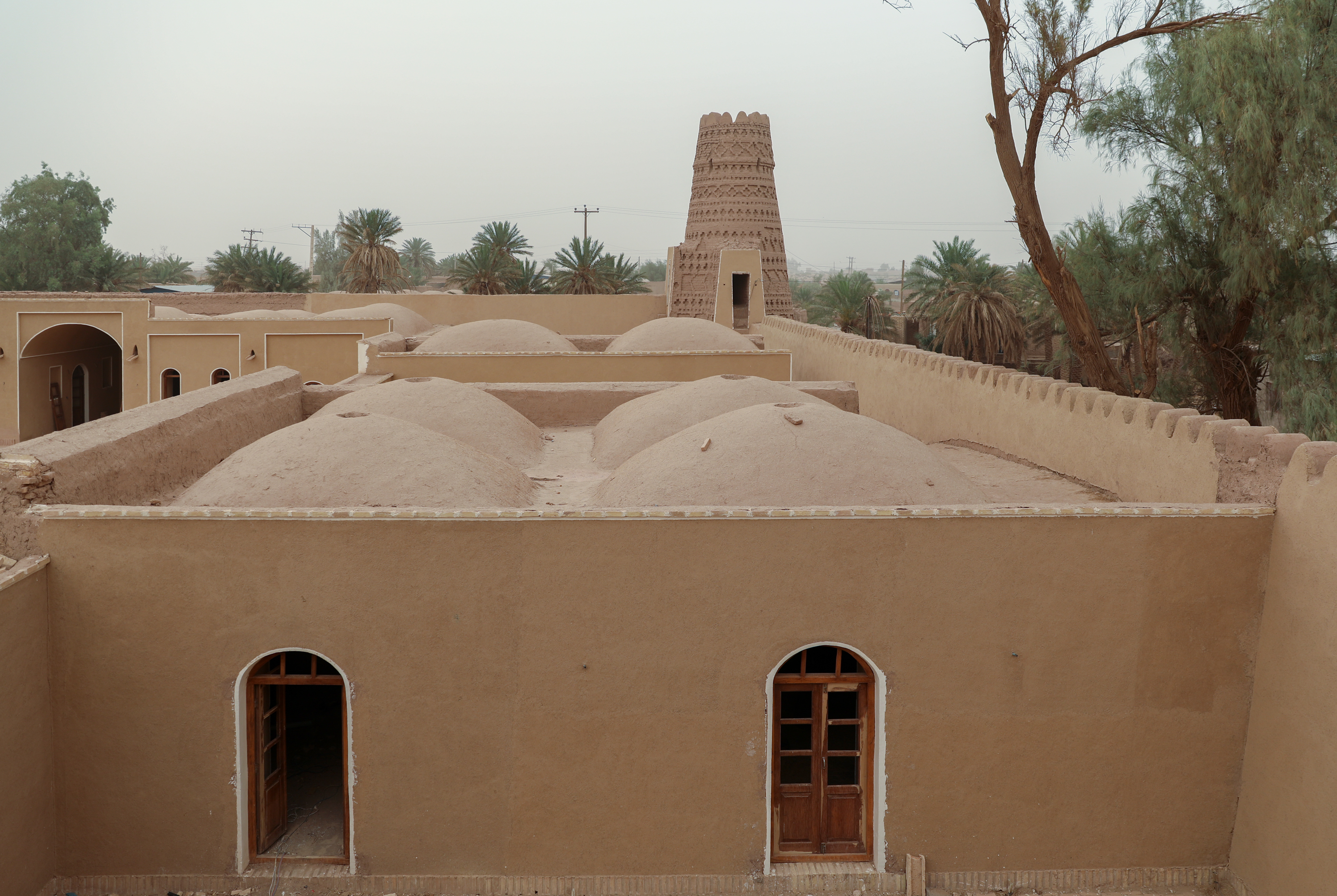

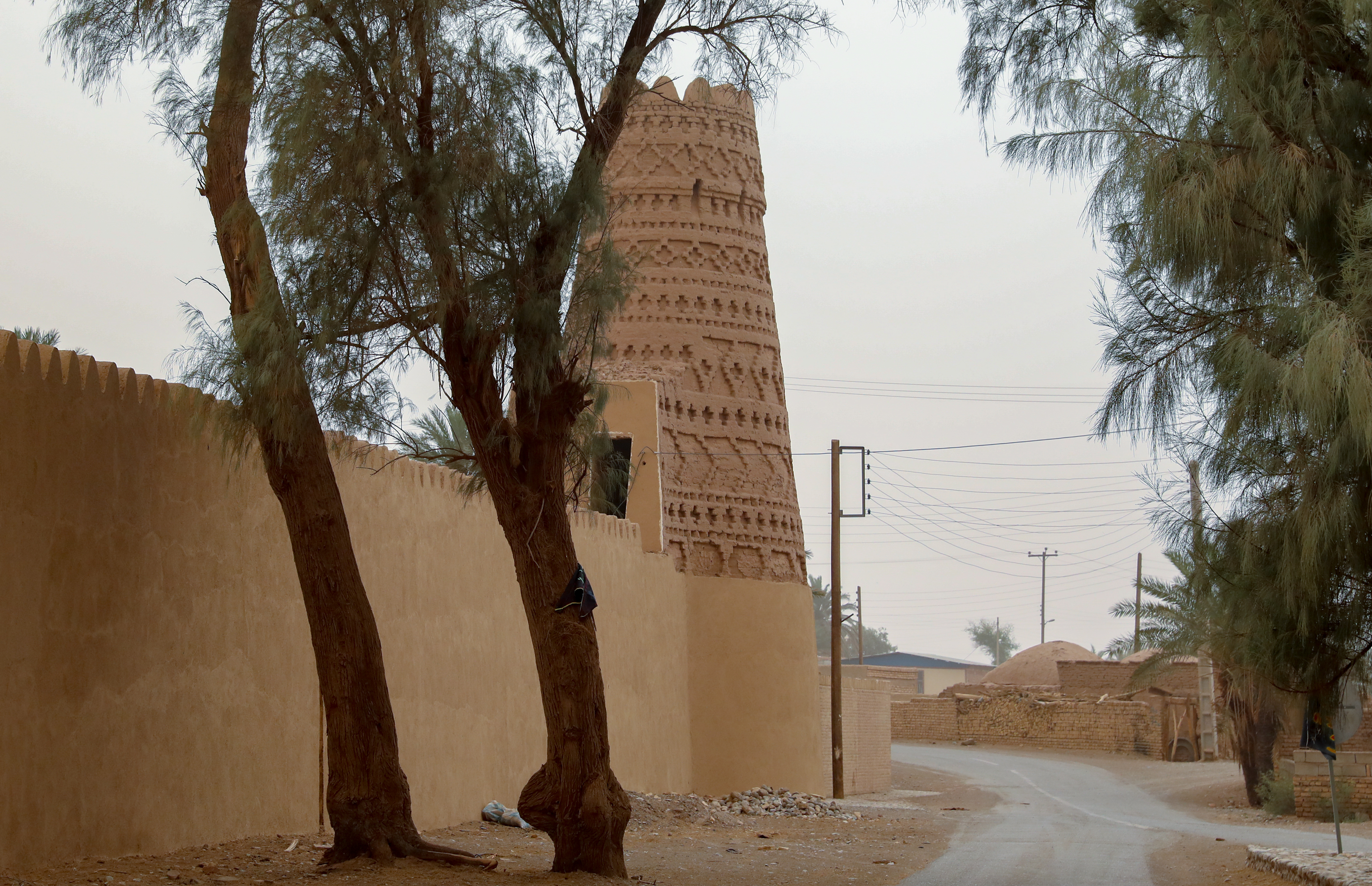
