= Shafiabad, Kerman =

Village in Kerman province, Iran

Shafiabad شفيع اباد
- Village
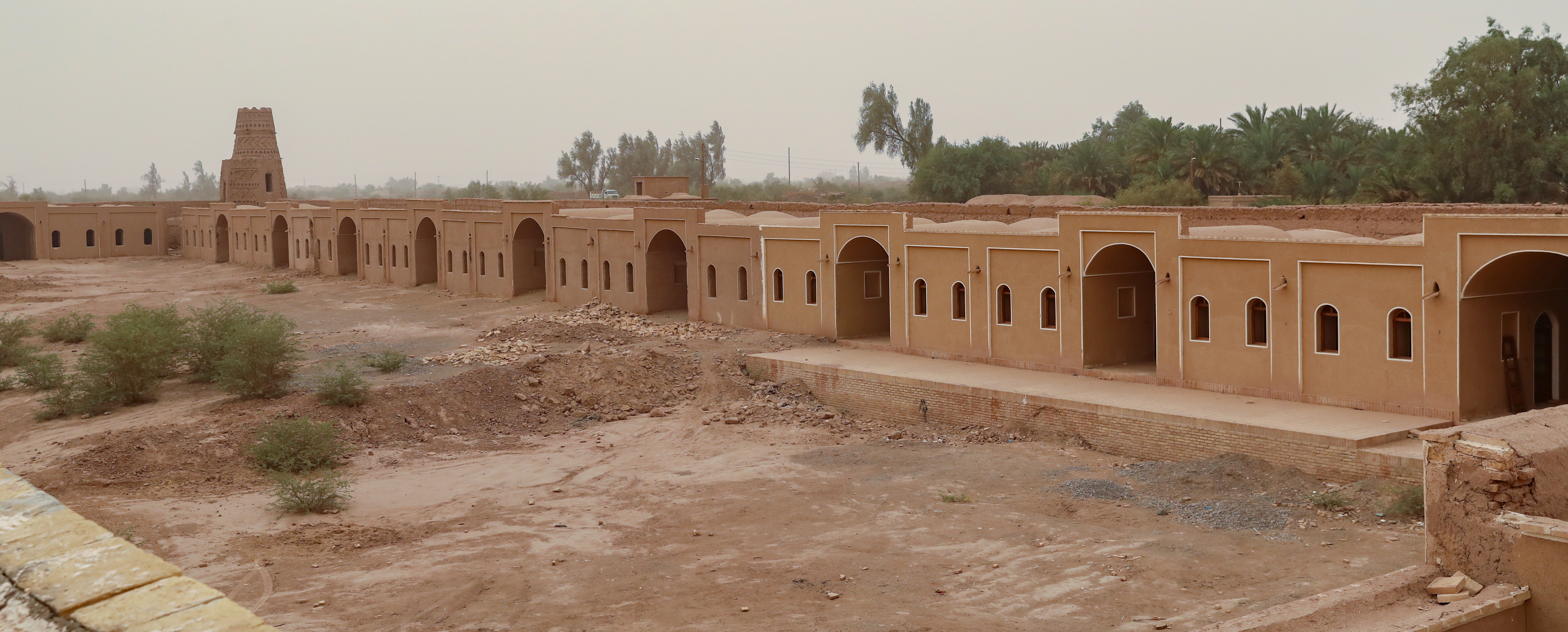

- Location within Iran
- Coordinates: 30°32′44″N 57°46′24″E
- Country: Iran
- Province: Kerman
- County: Kerman
- Bakhsh: Shahdad
- Rural District: Takab

Population (2006)
  - Total: 146
- Time zone: UTC+3:30 (IRST)
  - Summer (DST): UTC+4:30 (IRDT)

Shafiabad (Persian: شفيع اباد, also Romanized as Shafī‘ābād) is a village in Takab Rural District, Shahdad District, Kerman County, Kerman province, Iran. At the 2006 census, its population was 146, in 33 families. The Shafiabad Castle is located in this village.
